= List of historic properties in Globe, Arizona =

- City
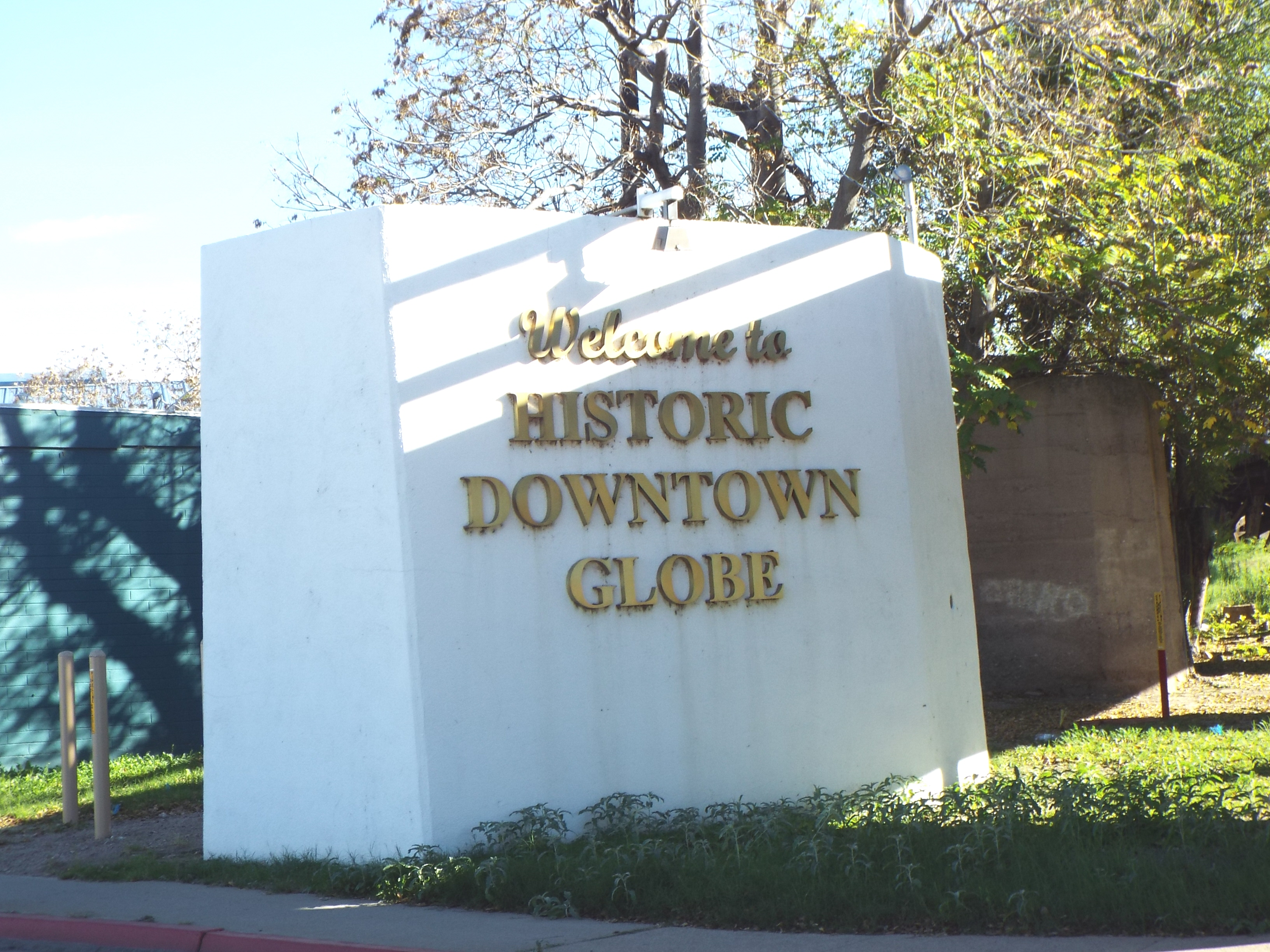
- Welcome to Historic Downtown Globe

This is a list which includes a photographic gallery, of historic structures, of significance in Globe, Arizona, a mining town. Some are listed in the National Register of Historic Places. Globe is located in the heart of Arizona's Tonto National Forest on U.S. Routes 60. Also, pictured is the historic Southern Pacific Railroad Steam Engine #1774 and the North and Broad Street Overpass.

== Brief history ==
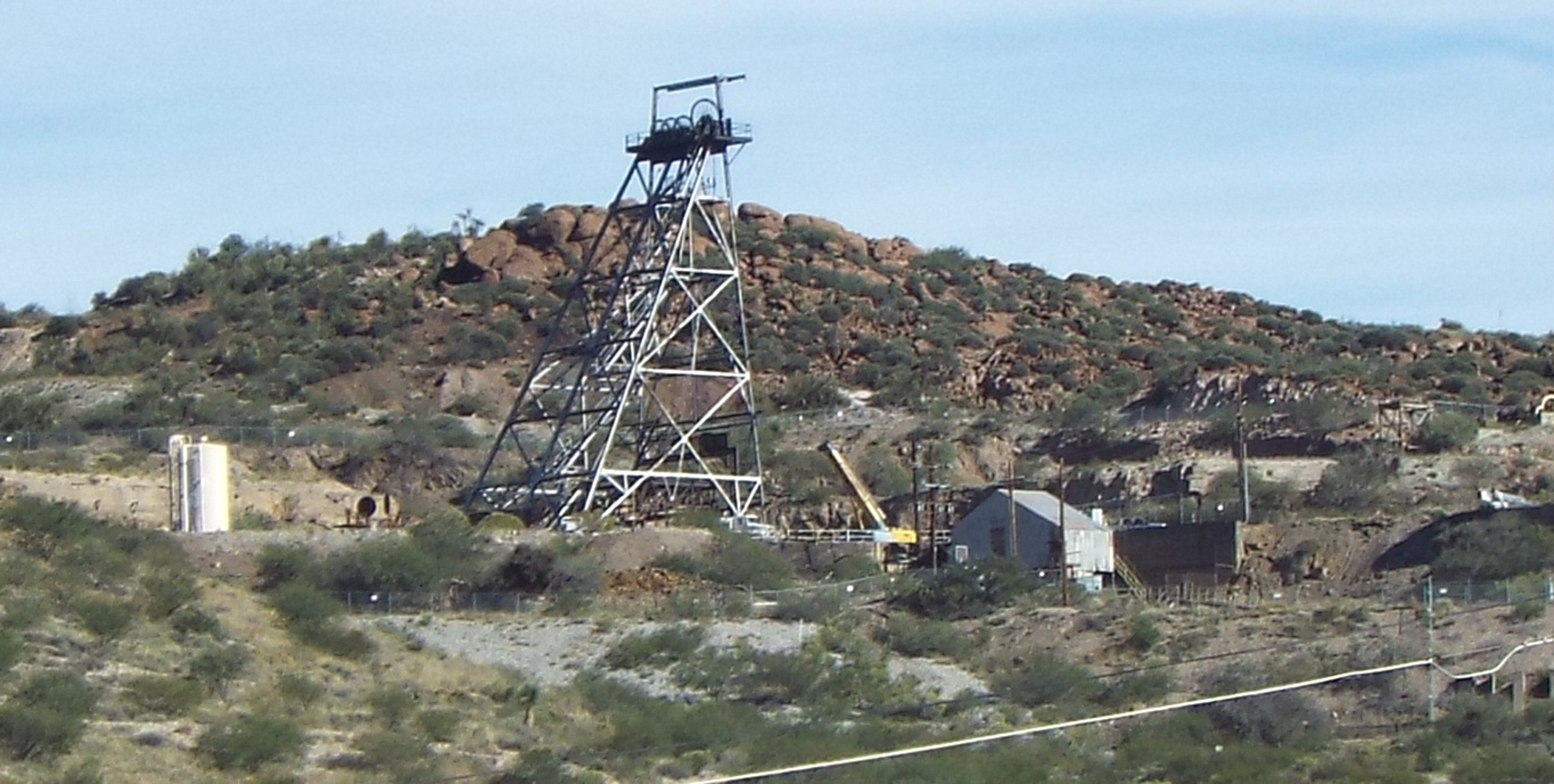
Old Dominian Copper Company smelter complex

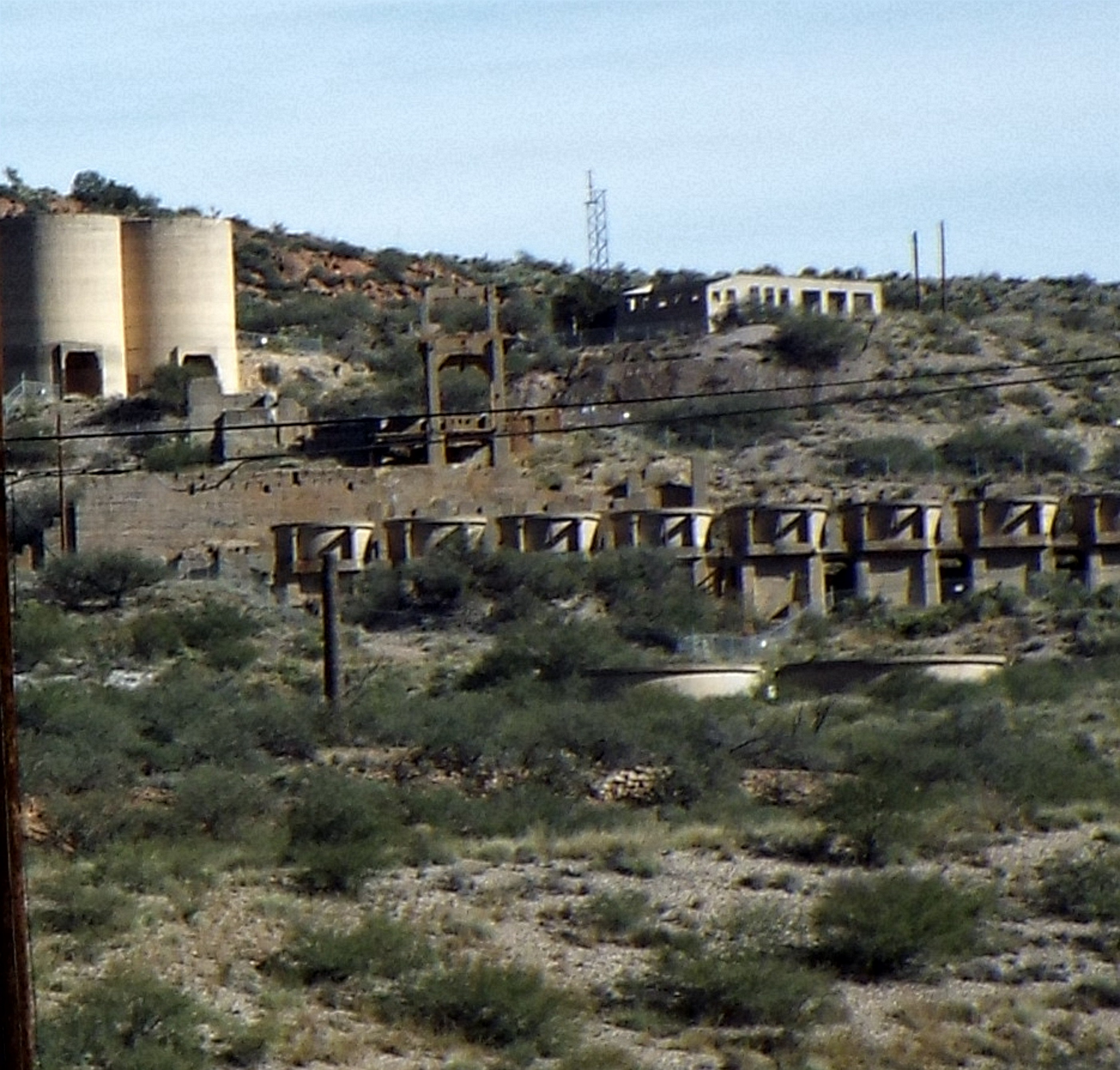
Old Dominian Copper Company smelter complex

Among the first people known to inhabit the area where Globe is situated were the prehistoric Salado people, who established the Besh Ba Gowah Pueblo. No one knows what happened to the Salado and why they disappeared. The San Carlos Apache's and other Native American tribes settled the area that once belonged to the Salado's.

The first Europeans to arrive in the area were the Spanish conquistadors. Captain Don Garcia de Cardenas and his party arrived in Arizona, which at the time was part of "New Mexico", in 1540. In 1582, Antonio de Espejo organized a silver prospecting expedition in the area. They did not have any luck in their venture. The area became part of Mexico when Mexico gained its independence from Spain.

The United States fought against Mexico in what is known as the Mexican–American War. The war ended officially when the 1848 Treaty of Guadalupe Hidalgo was signed and forced onto the remnant Mexican government. It specified its major consequence, the Mexican Cession of the northern territories of Alta California and Santa Fe de Nuevo México to the United States.

Two of the men who organized their own gold prospecting parties were Corydon E. Cooley, a former New Mexico hotel owner and Calvin Jackson, a saloon keeper. Cooley had served as a First Lieutenant in the Second New Mexico Volunteer Infantry Regiment during the American Civil War. On September 26, 1869, he joined forces with Jackson after being attacked by the Apaches several times. They did not find gold, however they did find silver.

The prospecting parties which followed were constantly attacked by the Apaches in the Pinal Mountain area. Therefore, in 1871, the U. S. Army sent General George Crook in an expedition into the area to suppress the Apaches. The complex and bloody expedition became known as the Tonto campaigns. Crook was able to terminate the Apache resistance by 1873. New teams of prospectors began to stake their claims and they organized the Pinal Mining Company.

In 1872, the United States Government established the San Carlos Apache Indian Reservation. The miners asked the Secretary of the Interior, Francis Amasa Walker, to remove part of the region which would become the 'Globe Mining District'. Walker complied with the request and the Mining Act of 1872 was adopted. The act became the official law governing the district. The townsite of 'Globe City' was officially laid out in July 1876. Globe became the seat of Gila County, a new Arizona county, in February 1881.

The price of silver had decreased by 1881, however by the same token the price of copper increased. The Old Dominian Copper Mining Company began to flourish. Copper mining is the most profitable venture in Globe.

== The Besh Ba Gowah ruins ==
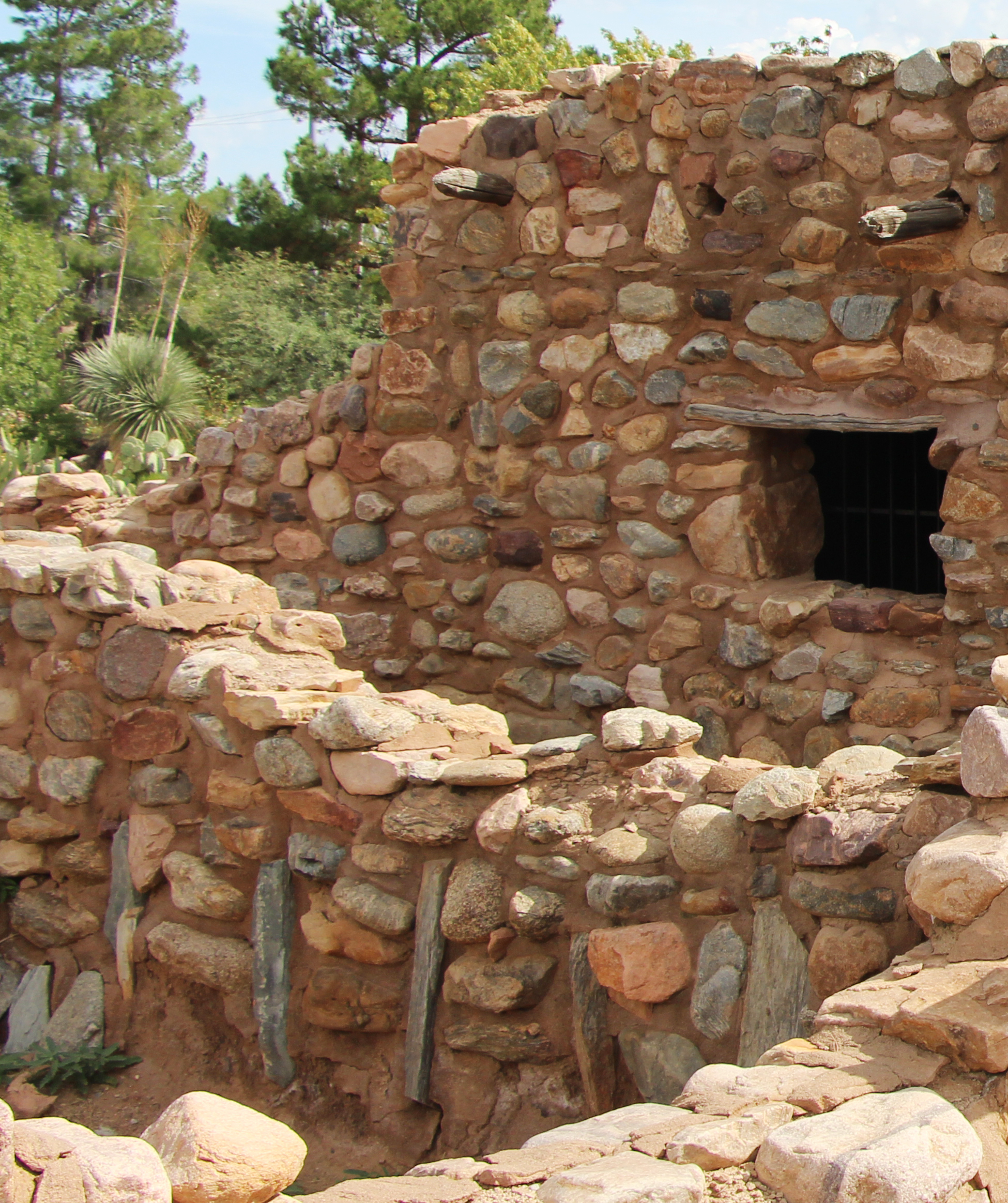
Besh-Ba-Gowah ruin

About a mile southwest from Globe are the ruins of Besh-Ba-Gowah a Salado masonry pueblo. The Salado were a melting pot of cultures. As visitors and immigrants came through the Salado area, their practices, lifestyles and customs were adopted and adapted based on practicality, applicability and necessity to the Salado peoples. They were farmers who used mud and rocks to construct multistory dwellings, or pueblos in the siltstone hills.

The Besh-Ba-Gowah pueblo consisted of 200-rooms and overlooks Pinal Creek. The Salado occupied this site between AD 1225 and AD 1400. Besh-Ba-Gowah is considered one of the Salado culture "type sites". At least 150 burials were exhumed from the central plaza. Archaeologists have discovered that a social structure including elites with substantial material differences existed by studying the preparation of the deceased and the mortuary offerings buried with the dead.

What became of the Salado people is a mystery. Archaeologists nor Historians know the reason or reasons that the Salado disappeared. The San Carlos Apache's and other Native American tribes later settled these lands. The site is operated by the city as Besh Ba Gowah Archaeological Park and Museum and was listed in the National Register of Historic Places on May 9, 1984, Ref. #84000648.

== Historic buildings pictured ==
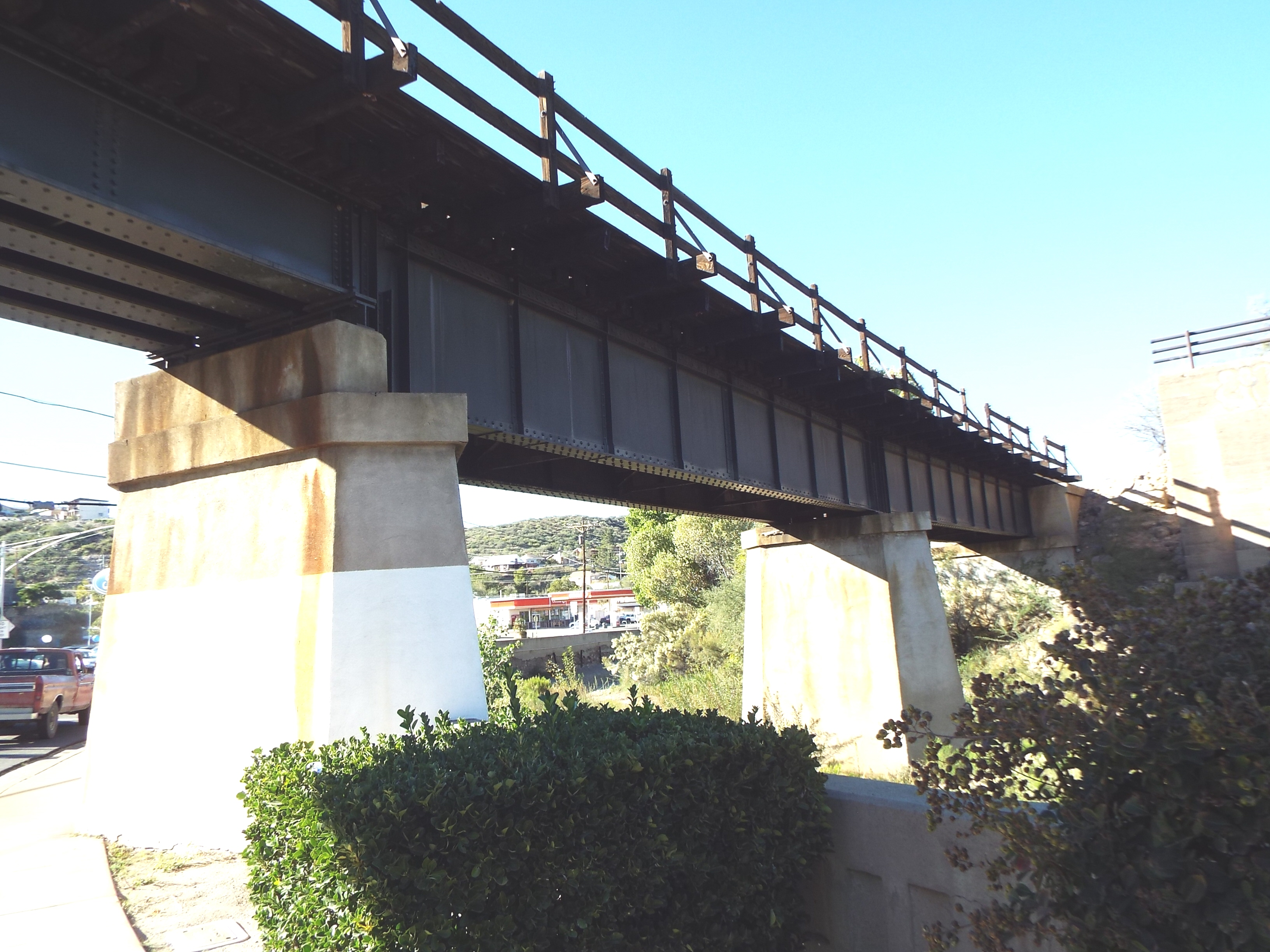
North and Broad Street Overpass

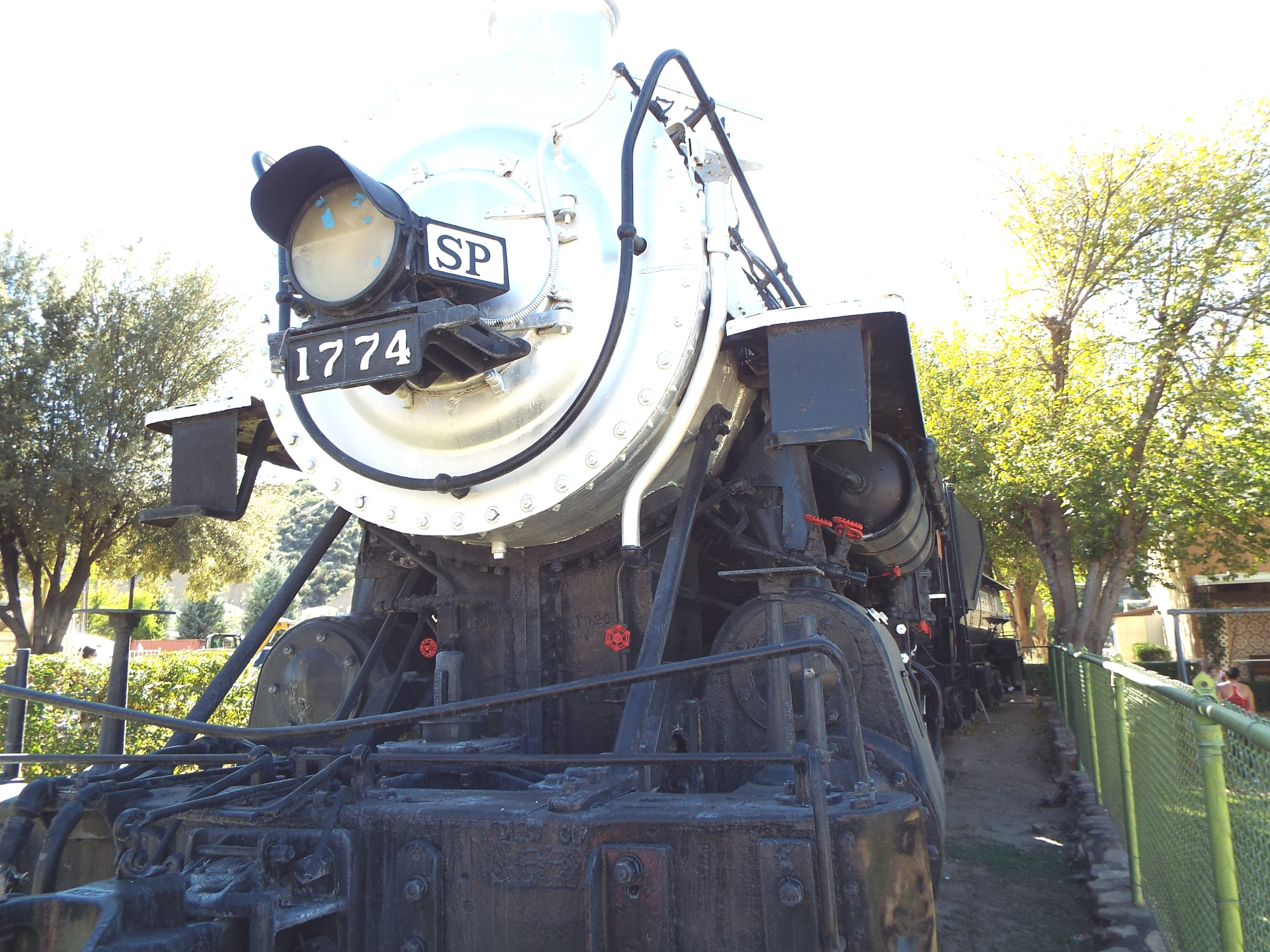
Historic Steam Engine#1774

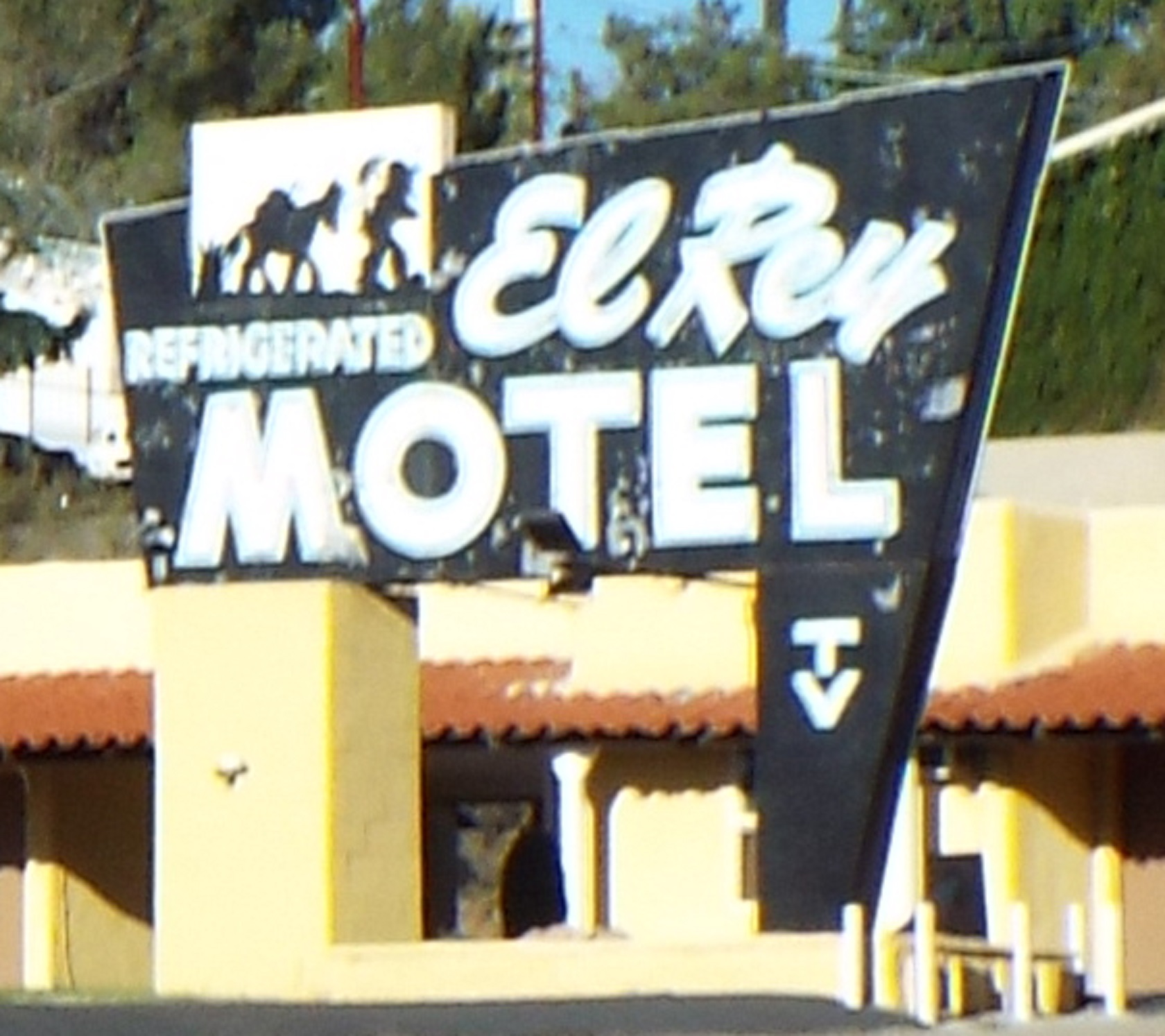
Vintage 1938 El Rey Motel sign

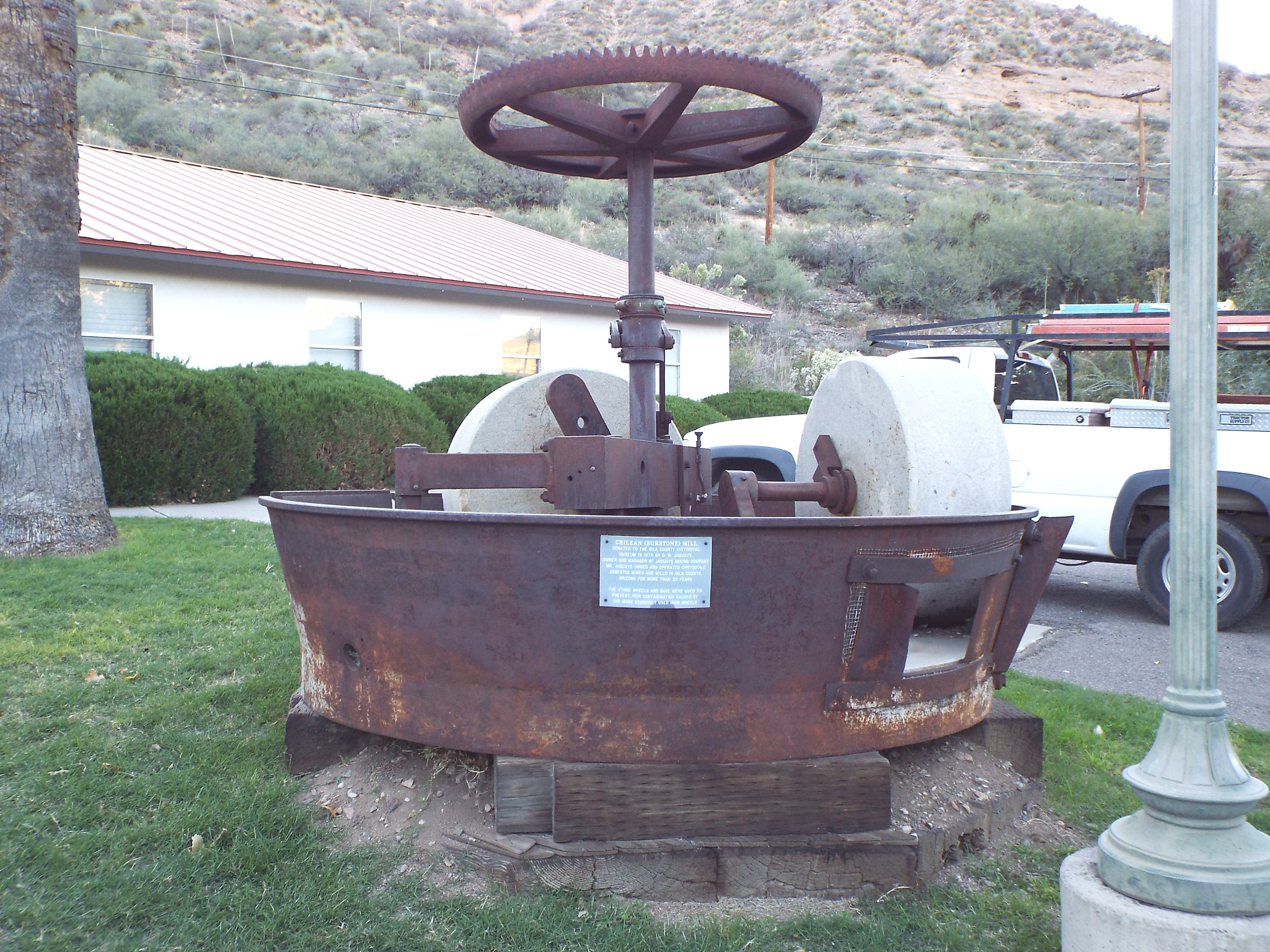
1900 Chilean (Burrstone) Mill

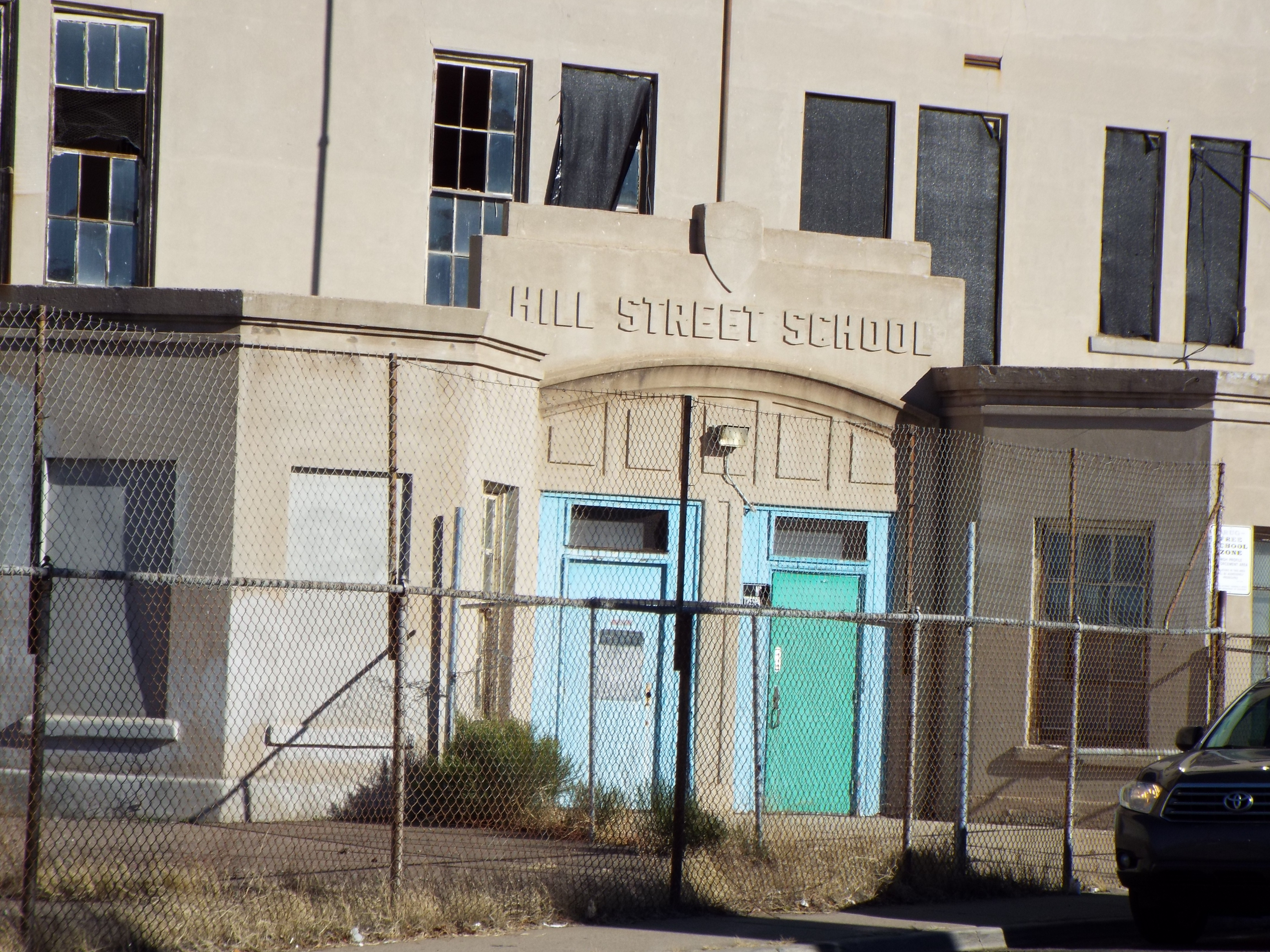
Hill Street School main entrance

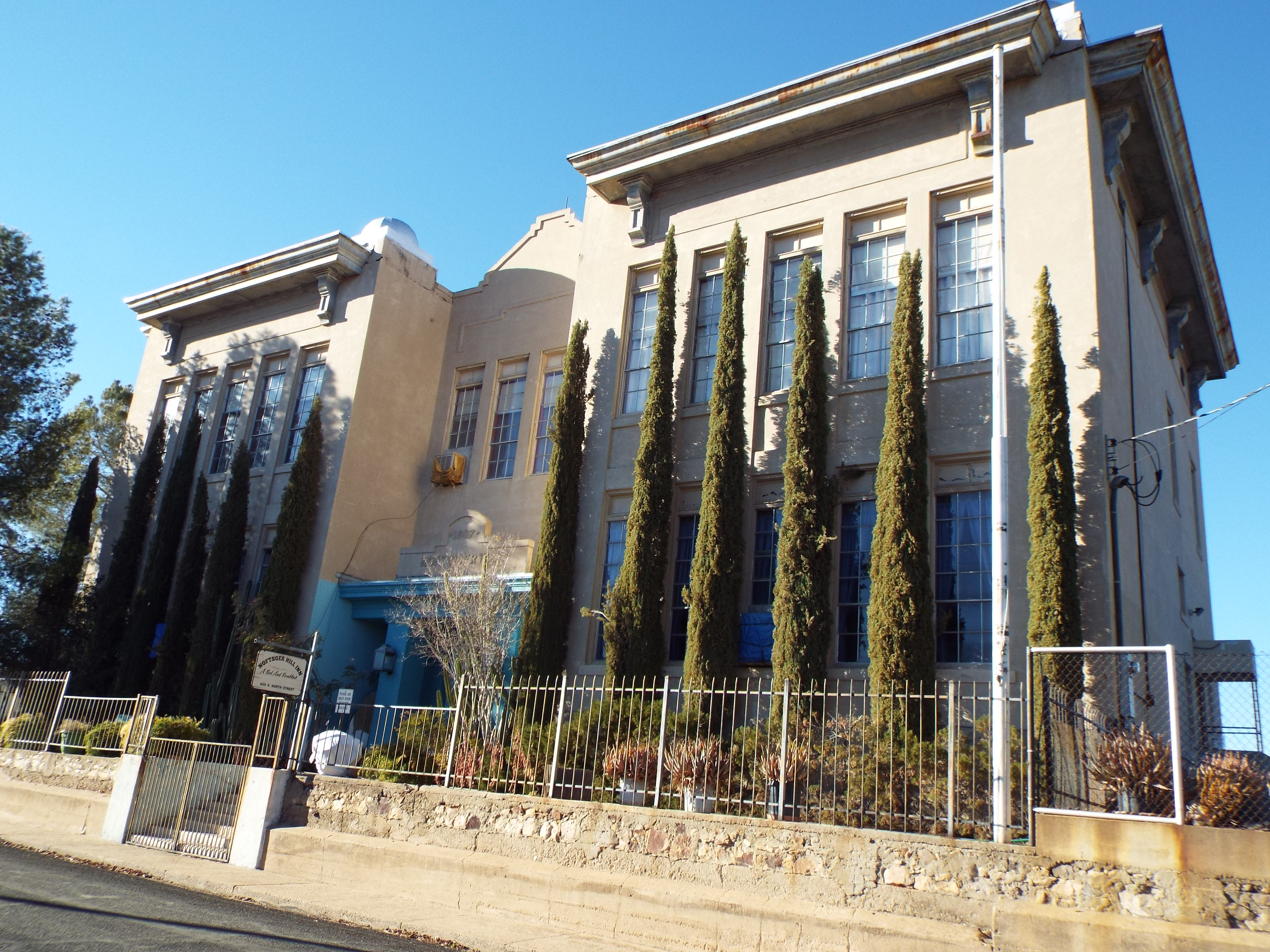
Noftsger Hill School

The following are of some the historic buildings in Globe Some of these buildings are listed in the National Register of Historic Places. Also listed are some of the buildings which are within the boundaries of the Globe Downtown Historic District. The boundaries of the district is situated on Broad St. between Cedar and Tebbs. The area was listed in the National Register of Historic Places on May 28, 1987, Ref. #87000862. Some of the buildings within the boundaries of the historic district are individually listed in the National Register of Historic Places. The Gila Mine Rescue Station which is listed in the National Register of Historic Places, now houses the Gila County Historical Museum. Located on the grounds of the museum is the historic 1900 Chilean (Burrstone) Mill. Plus, the Steam Engine #1774 and the North and Broad Street Overpass, which are of historic significance to the City of Globe, are also listed here.

- The Old Dominion Commercial Co. Office – This structure was built in 1904 and is located at 190 South Broad St.
- Eastern and Southern Pacific Railroad Depot – This structure was built in 1817 and is located at 230 South Broad St.
- Eastern and Southern Pacific Railroad Restaurant/YMCA – The structure was built in 1817 and is located at 230 South Broad St.
- Holy Angels Church – The church was built in 1918 and is located at 231 South Broad Street. It was listed in the National Register of Historic Places on December 1, 1983, Ref. #83003448. The stained glass windows were designed by Emil Frei Sr., one of America's foremost stained glass artists.
- Upton's Confectionary – This structure was built in 1910 and is located at 247 South Broad Street. Cliffort Upton owned the confectionery which at first was known as the Factory Store. It became the center of the candy-making business.
- Van Wagenen/Fisk Building – This structure was built in 1905 and is located at 147 Broad Street.
- The Residence – This house was built in 1900 and is located at 145 Broad Street.
- Banks Paint – This structure was built in 1910 and is located at 143 South Broad Street.
- The Federal Building – The structure was built in 1910 and is located at 109 South Broad Street.
- Gila County Courthouse – This structure is located at 101 North Broad Street. It was built in 1906, and listed in the National Register of Historic Places on May 27, 1975, Ref. #75000347. It is constructed of locally quarried dacite. The building now houses the Cobre Valley Center for the Arts.
- The Amster Building – The building is located at 108 North Street Broad St. It was built in 1915.
- The Odd Fellows Lodge Building – This structure was built in 1898 and is located at 110 South Broad Street is one of the oldest buildings in Globe.
- The Sultan/Woolworth Building – The building is located at 135 North Broad Street. It was built in 1916.
- The Hamil Building – This structure was built in 1906 and is located at 150 N. Broad Street.
- The Masonic Temple – This structure is located at 180 North Broad Street. It was built in 1912.
- Gila Valley Bank and Trust Building – The bank structure is located at 292 North Broad Street. It was built in 1900. It was listed in the National Register of Historic Places on August 6, 1987, Ref. #87000861.
- United States Post Office – This structure was built in 1928 and is located at 151 Hill Street. It was listed in the National Register of Historic Places on December 3, 1985, Ref. #85003106.
- The Globe Jail Building – This structure is located at 177 East Oak Street. It was built in 1910. The cell blocks were transported from the Yuma Territorial Prison. The building was in continuous use until 1981.
- St. John's Episcopal Church – This church is located at 185 E. Oak Street. It was built in 1901 It was listed in the National Register of Historic Places on November 22, 1977, Ref. #77000234. This is the oldest church in Gila Count.
- Family Fellowship Church – The church is located at 200 Oak Street. It was built in 1917.
- Butler Building – The hotel was built in 1901 and is located on the corner of Mezquite and Broad Streets.
- Elks Building – The structure is located at 155 West Mesquite Street. It was built in 1910. It was listed in the National Register of Historic Places on August 6, 1987, Ref. #87000860. The building has the distinction of being the tallest 3 story building in the United States. Within the Globe's Downtown Historic District.
- Murphy Hotel (Tonto Hotel) – The hotel was built in 1916 and located on the corner of Broad and Mesquite Streets.
- Ardon Hotel/Globe Bakery – This structure is located on the corner of Cedar and Broad Streets. It was built in 1908
- Cubito Jewelry Co. – This structure is located at 396 N. Broad Street. It was built in 1933.
- The International House – This structure is located at 634-638 North Broad Street. It was built in 1902. It was listed in the National Register of Historic Places on March 31, 1988, Ref. #88000233. The building was built by Rabogliatti Brothers, Alfred and Dominic. At the time, it was the finest and largest building on Broad Street.
- The Gila Mine Rescue Station – The rescue station is located at 1330 Broad Street. It was built in 1910. The station was listed in the National Register of Historic Places on June 7, 1990, Ref. #90000875. The Station supported rescue efforts for the Old Dominion Mine, which operated from 1914 into the 1960s. The station now houses the Gila County Historical Museum.
- The Gila Mine Rescue Station Carriage House – The carriage house is also located at 1330 Broad Street and was built in 1910. It was listed in the National Register of Historic Places on June 7, 1990, with the rescue station. Ref. #90000875.
- The Teepee – This structure was built of cement in 1940. It is located at 318 Cottonwood Street. The Teepee once housed a fast food restaurant, In 1972, it housed the Red Roan Saloon.
- Globe High School – The school is located at 437 High Street and was built in 1914.
- El Rey Motel – The motel is located at 1201 Ea st Ash Street. It was built in 1938. The motel features Elvis and Coca-Cola themed rooms.
- Hill Street School – The now abandoned school building is located at 450 Hill Street. It was built in 1913.
- Victorian House – The house is located at 434 South Hill Street. It was built in 1910.
- The Noftsger Hill School – Built in 1917 and located at 425 E. North Street.
- Steam Engine #1774 – This is a M-8 / 2-6-0 / 4’-81/2” from the Southern Pacific Railroad. The Steam Engine was built in 1901 by Burnham, Williams #20436. It is one of only seven still in existence in the world today. The locomotive is on permanent display in Memorial Park.
- The North and Broad Street Overpass – The bridge was built in 1910. Additions were made in 1923 for the Arizona Eastern Railway and the Southern Pacific Railroad.

== Historic structures ==
The following are the images of the historic structures in Globe and its surrounding areas.

Historic structures in Globe

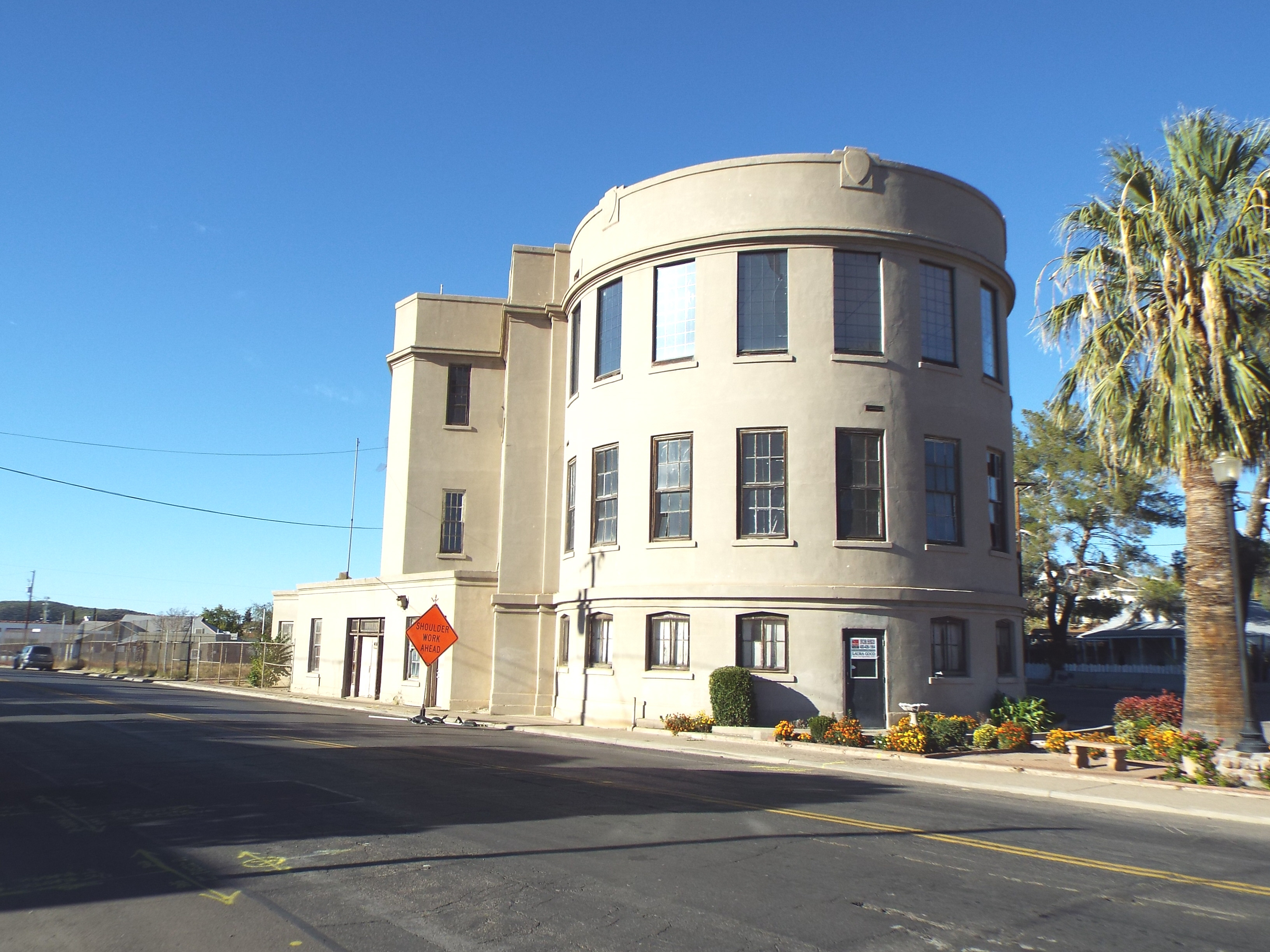
Hill Street School – 1913

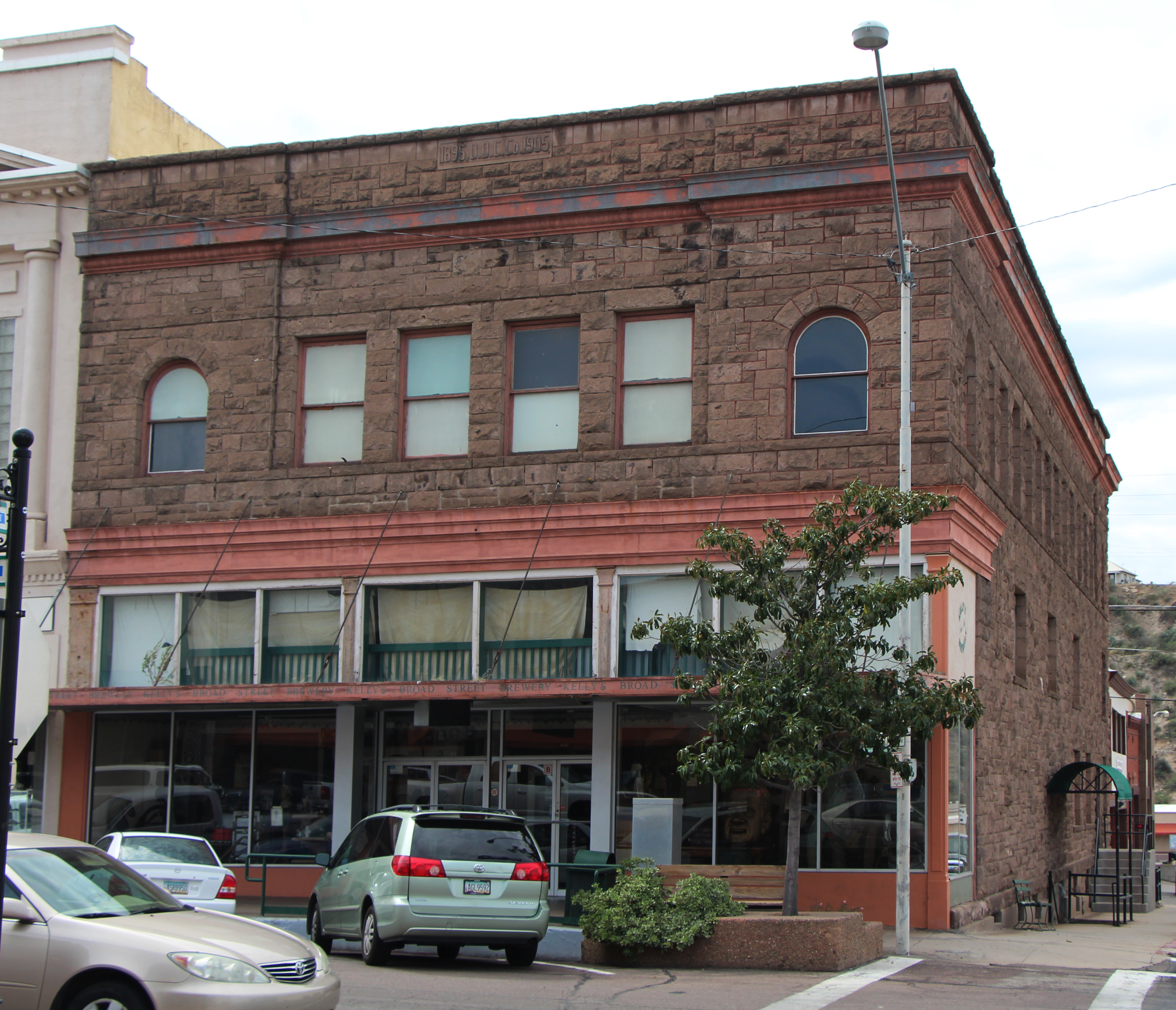
Old Dominion Commercial Co. Office

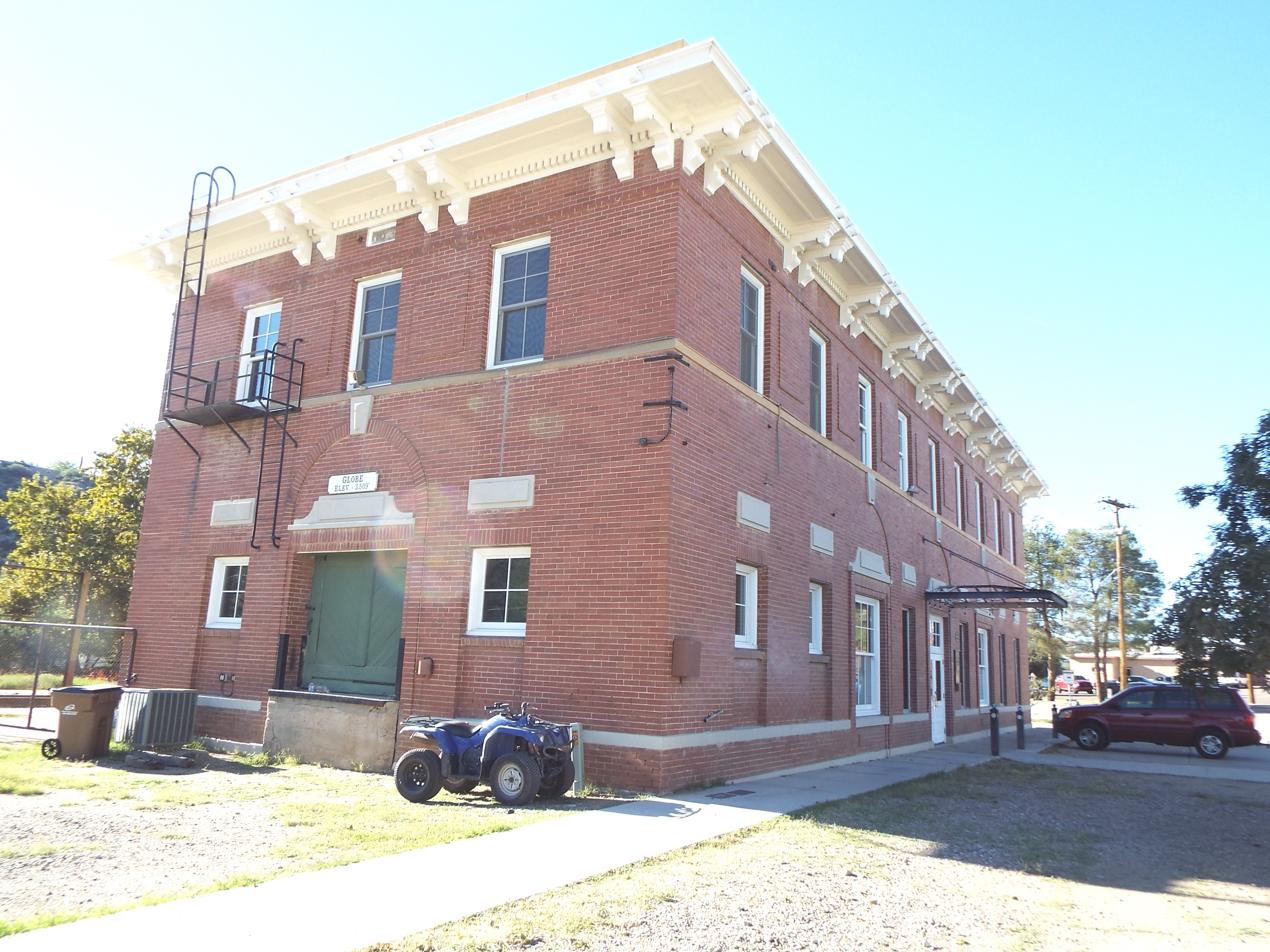
Eastern and Southern Pacific Railroad Depot

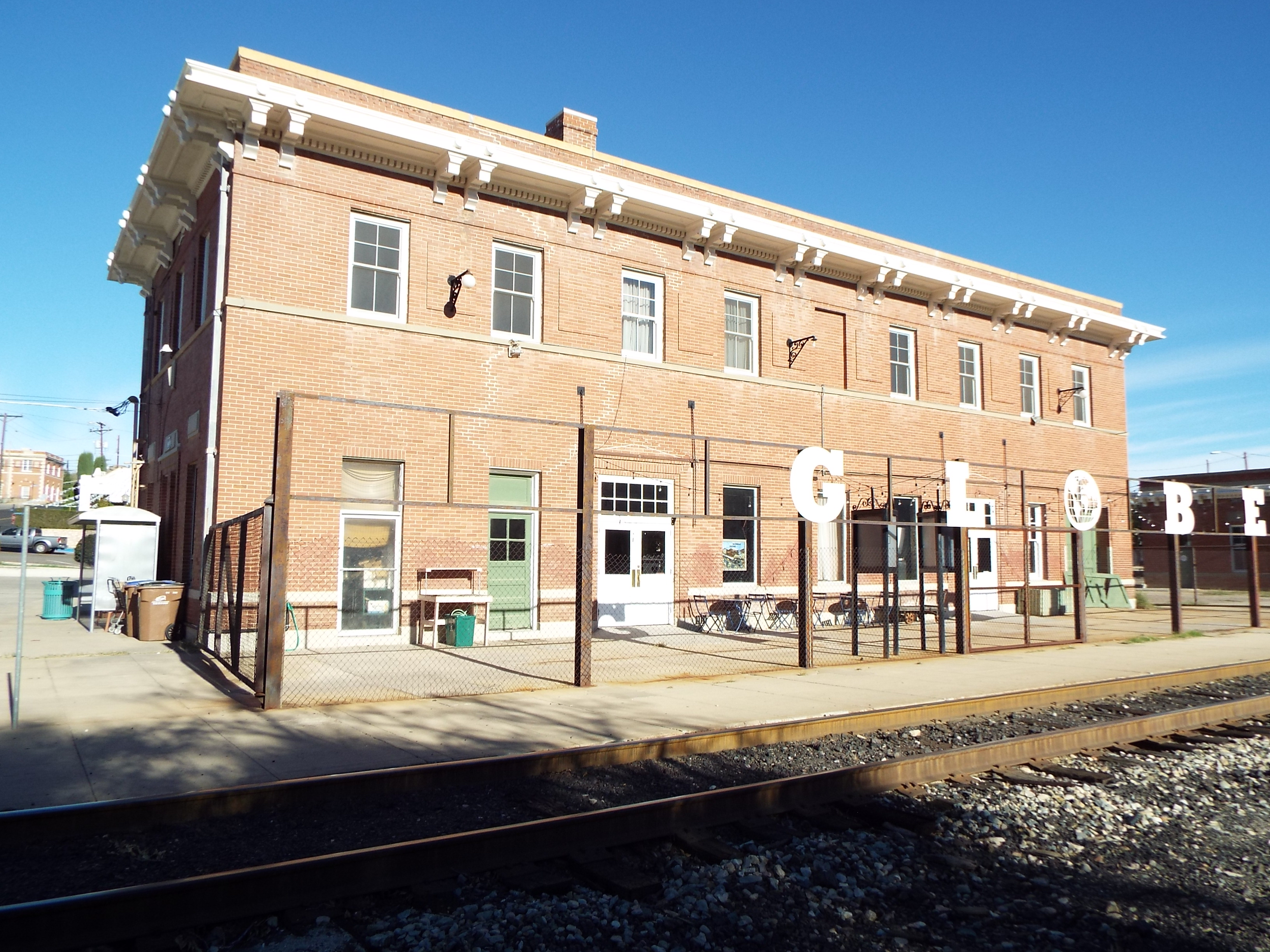
Back side of the Eastern and Southern Pacific Railroad Depot

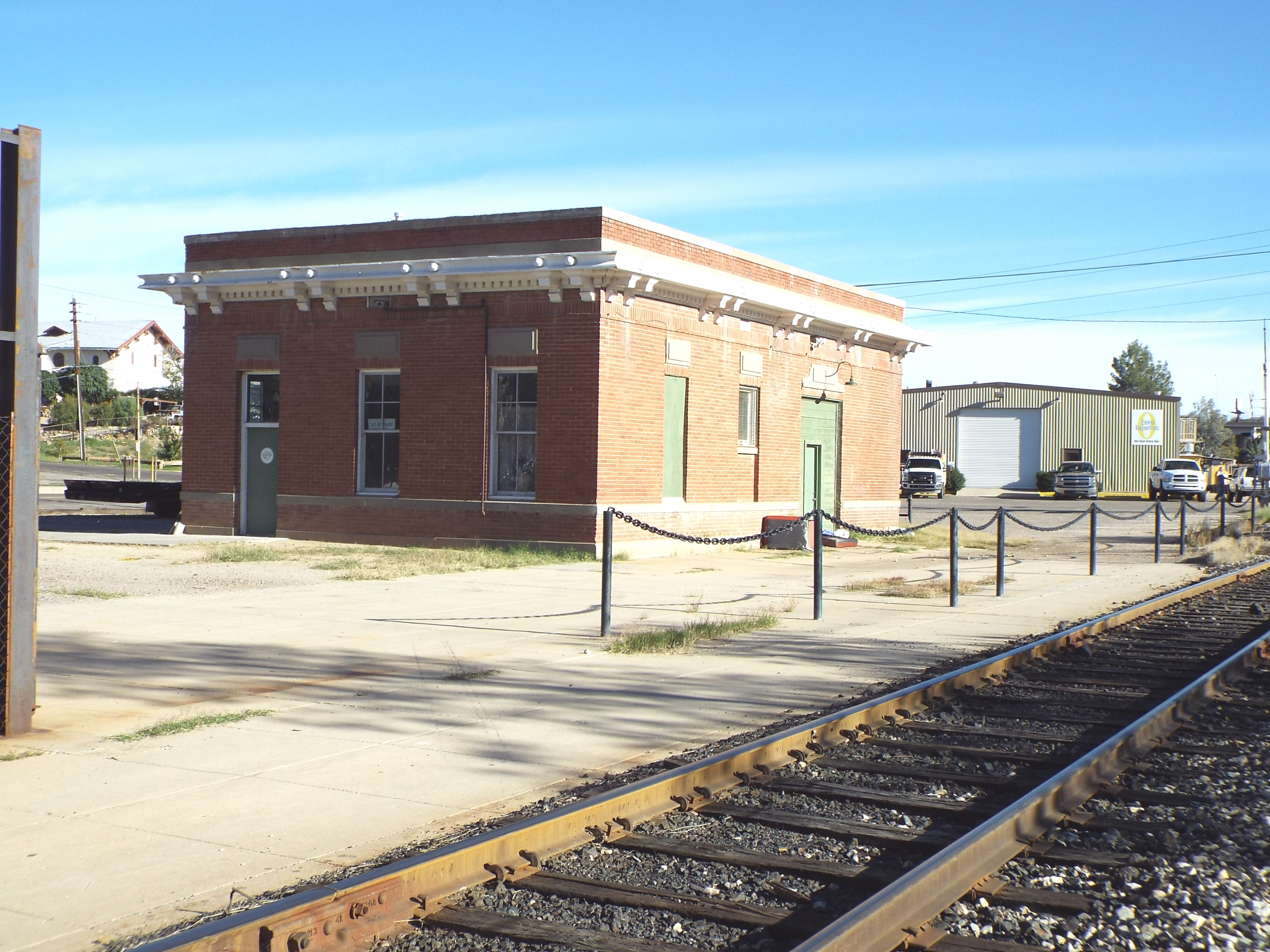
Eastern and Southern Pacific Railroad Freight Depot used as a Restaurant/YMCA.

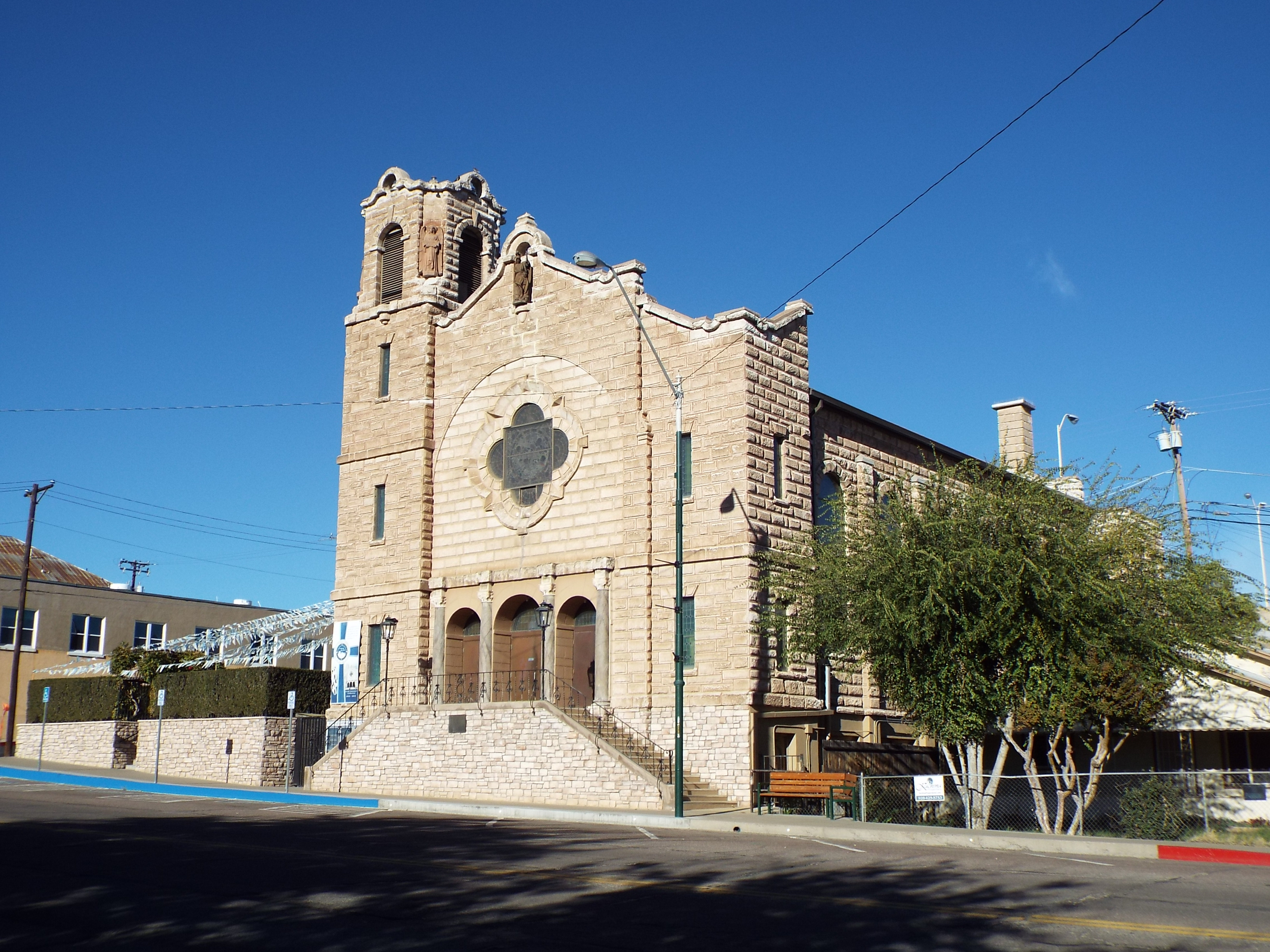
Holy Angels Church

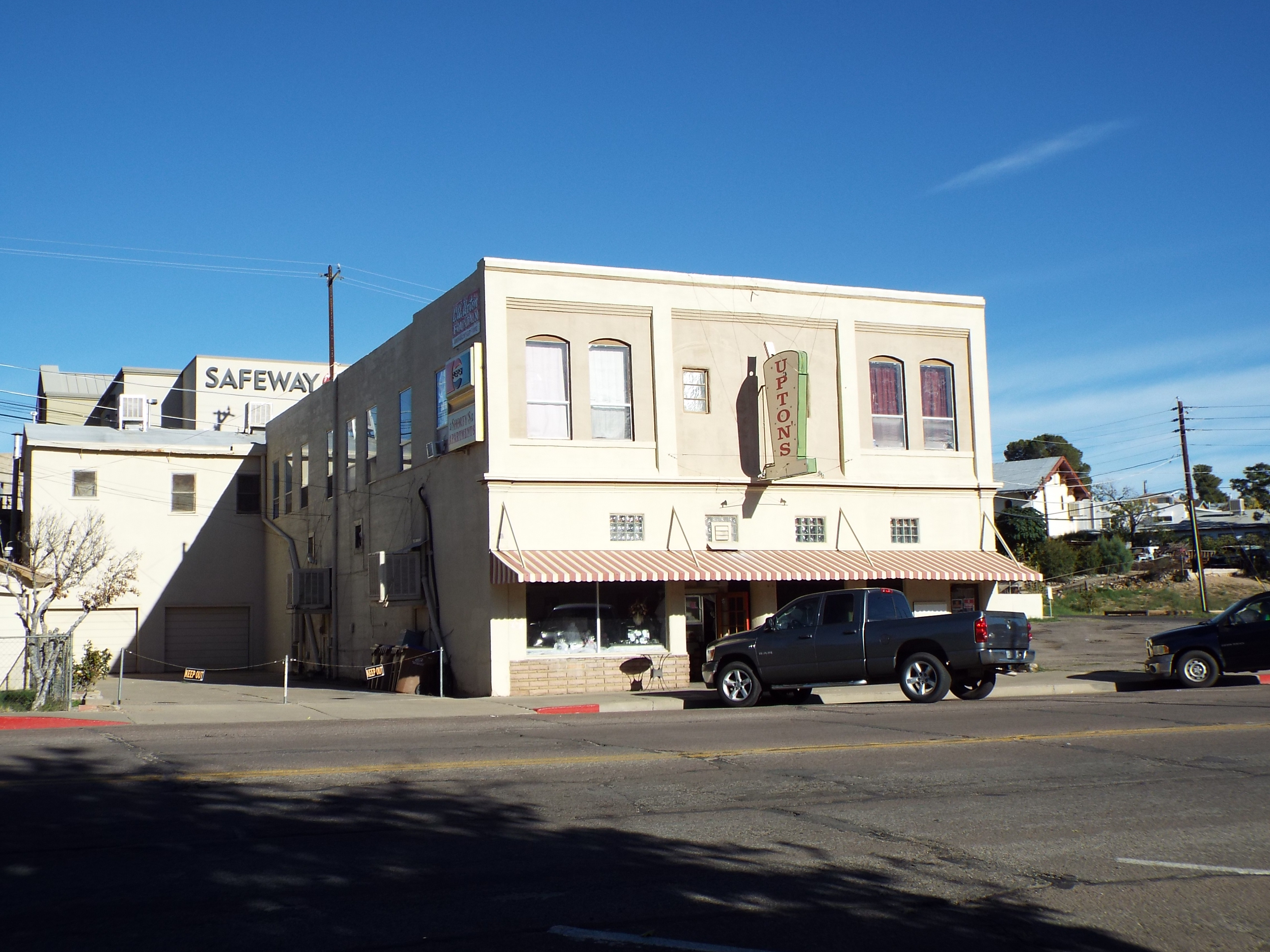
Upton’s Confectionary

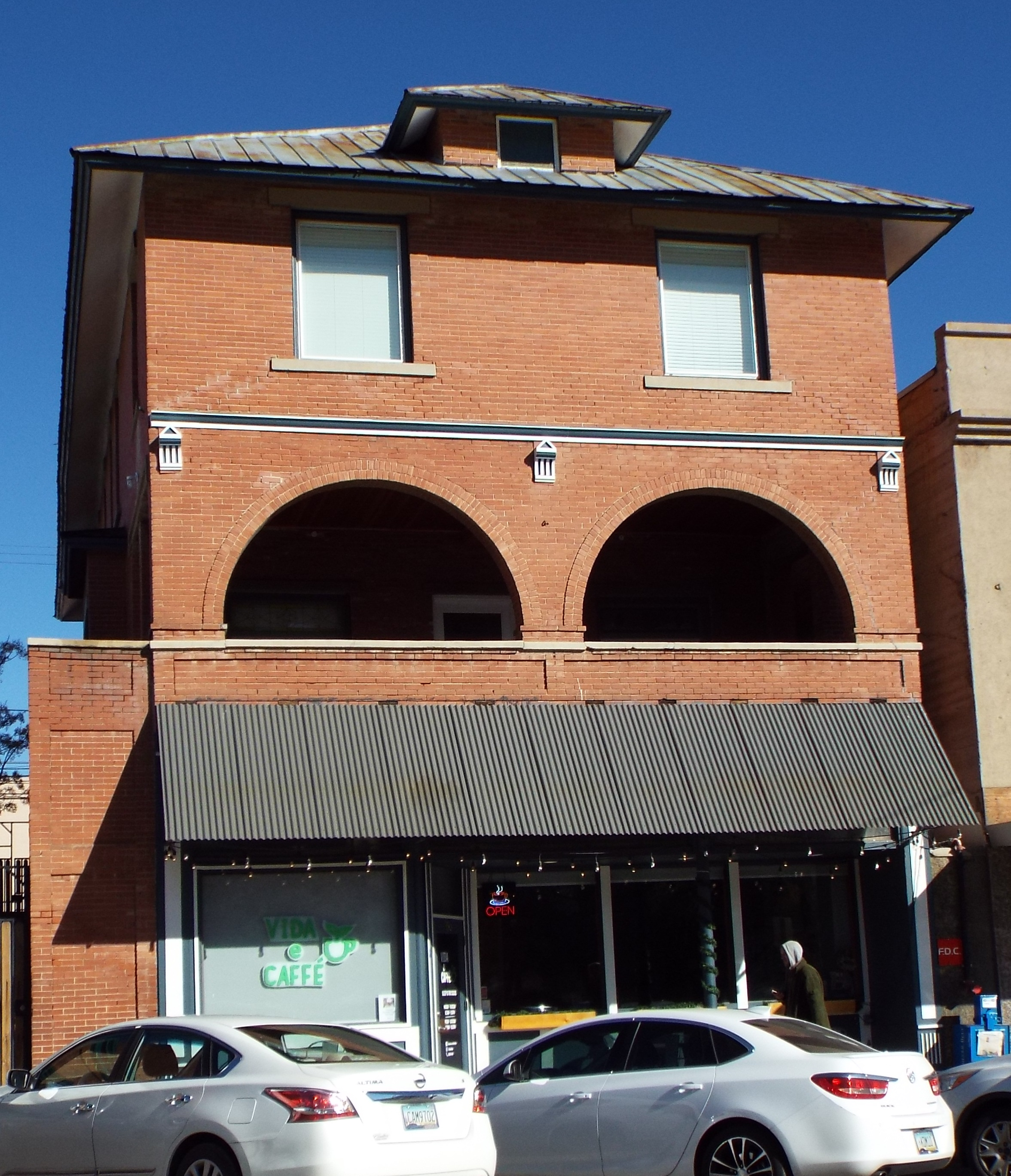
Wagenen/Fisk Building

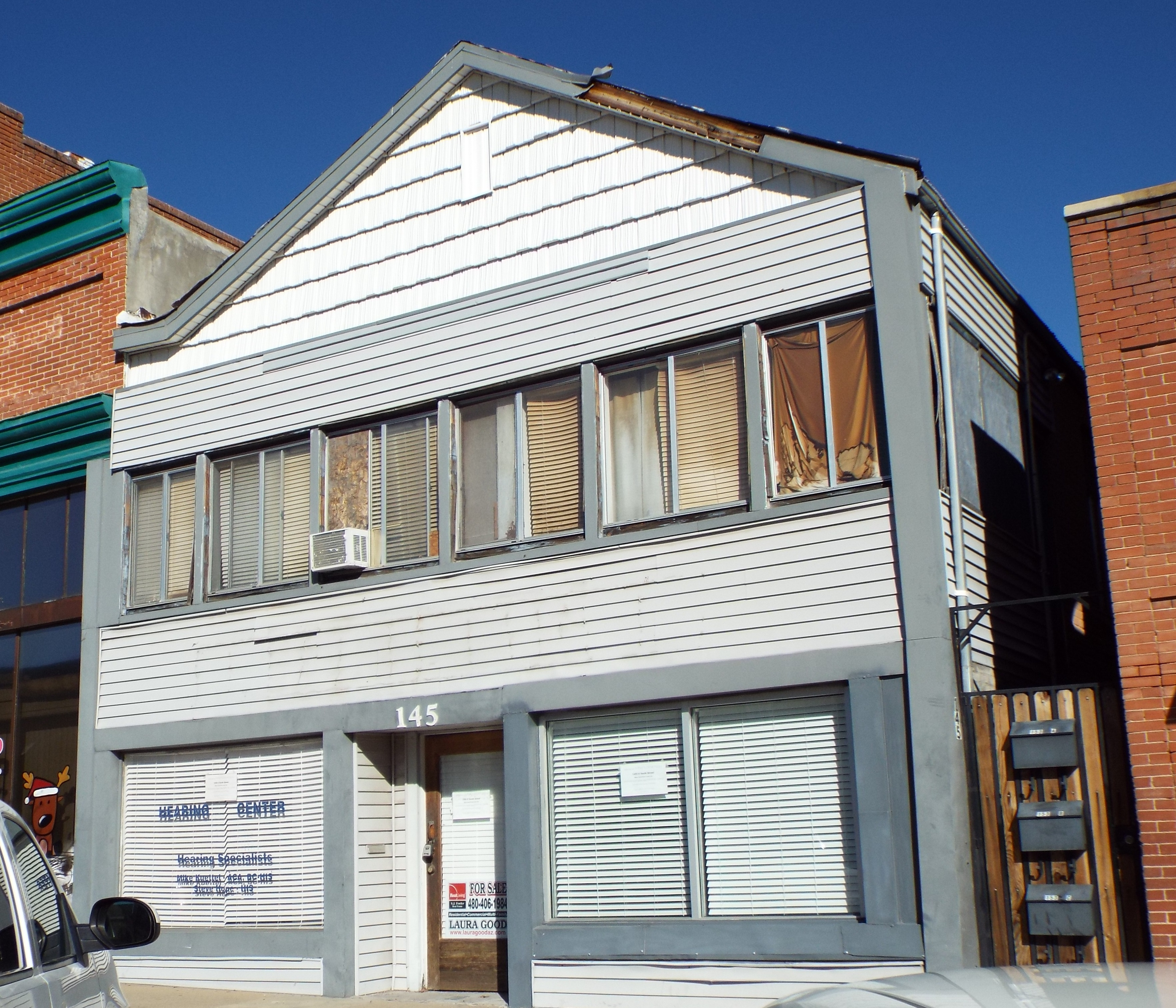
The Residence

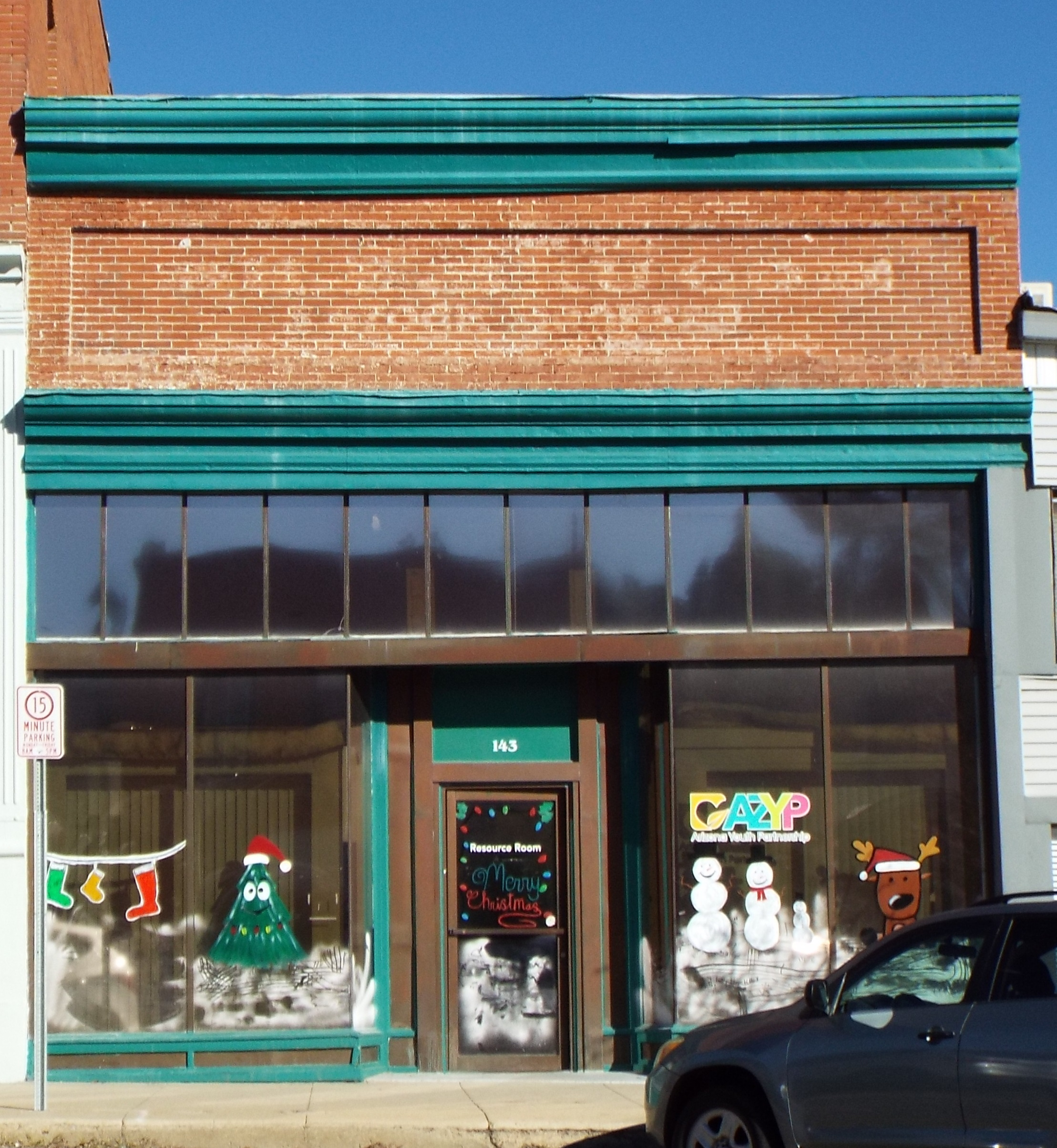
Banks Paints

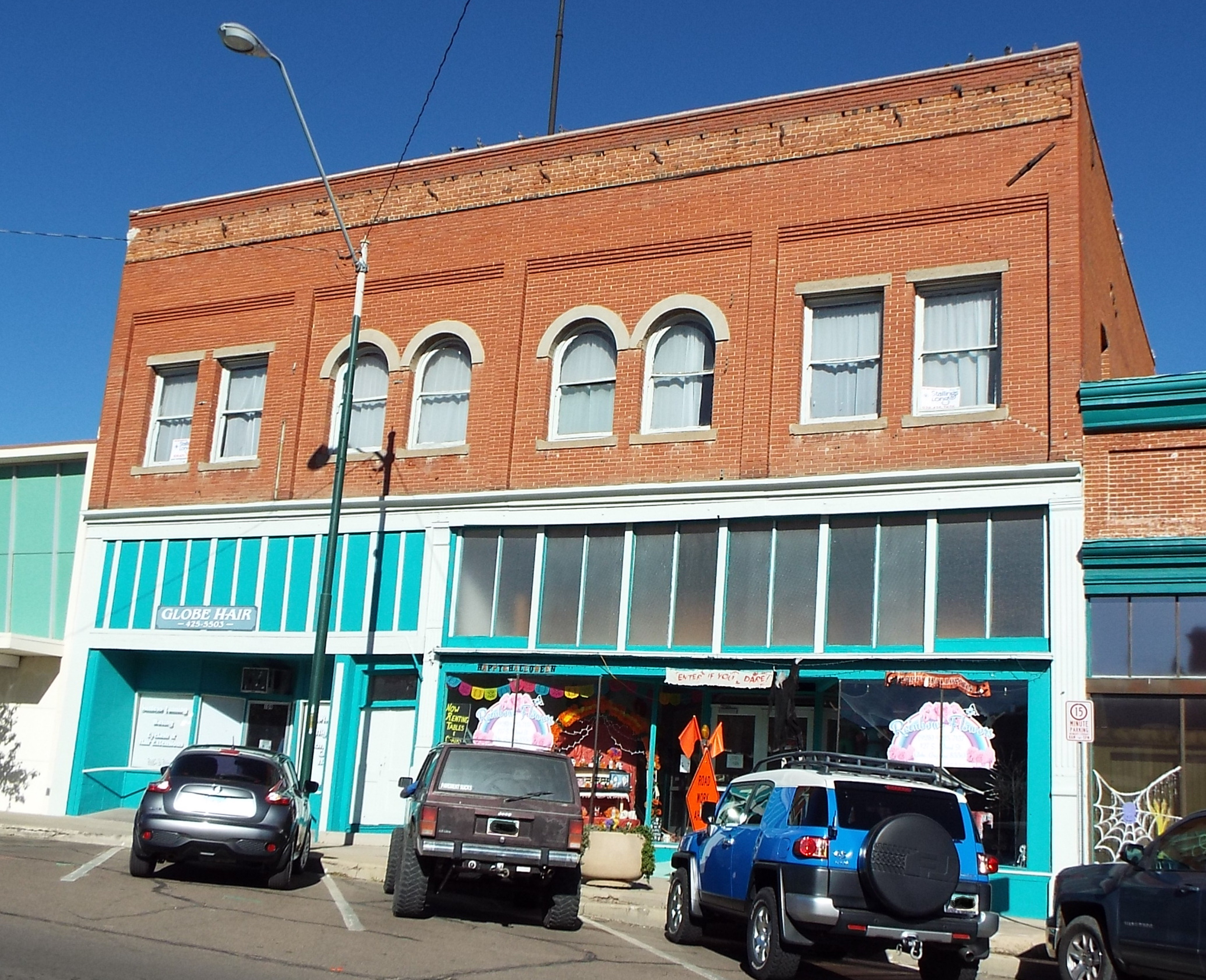
Federal Building

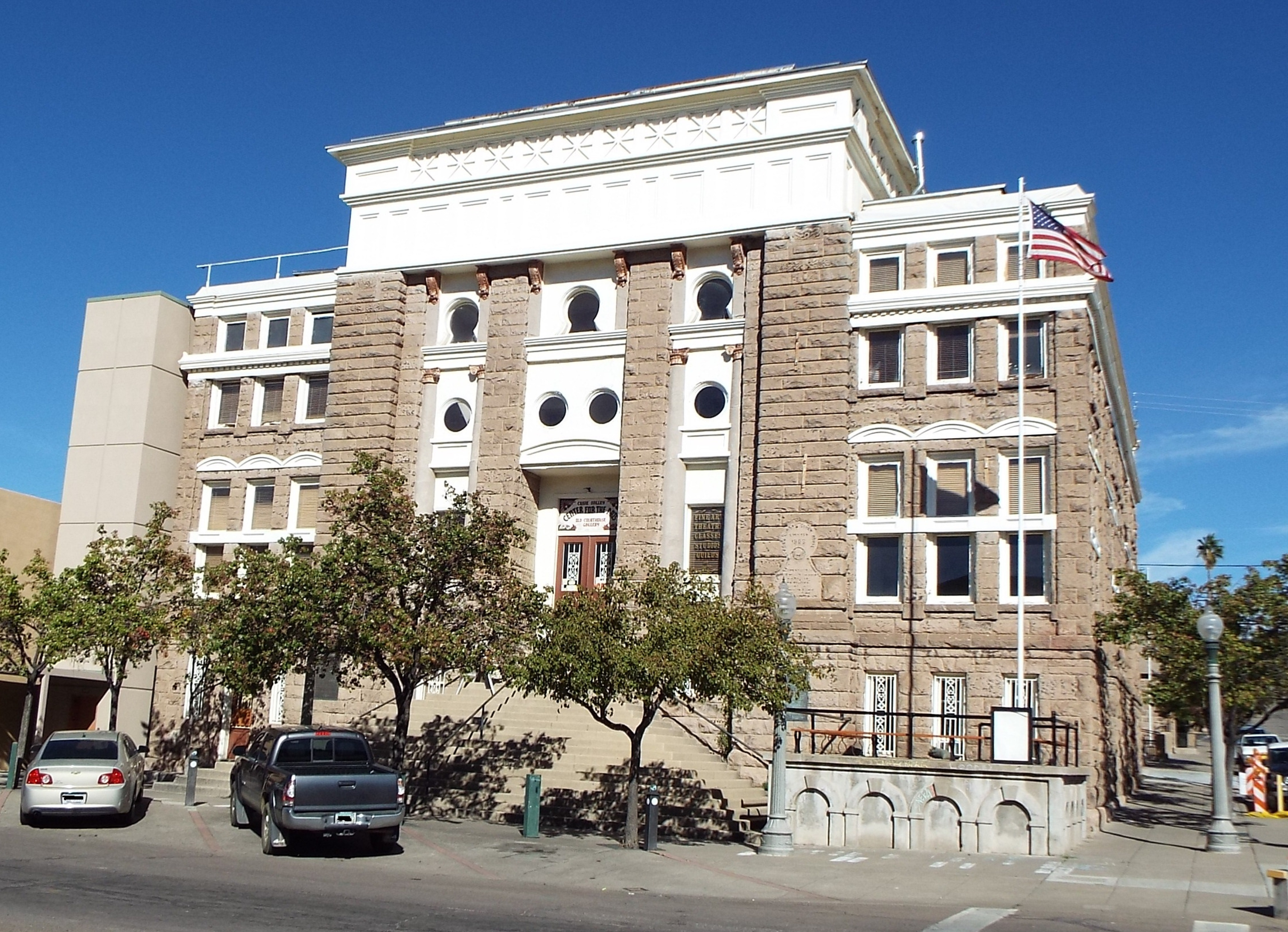
Gila County Courthouse

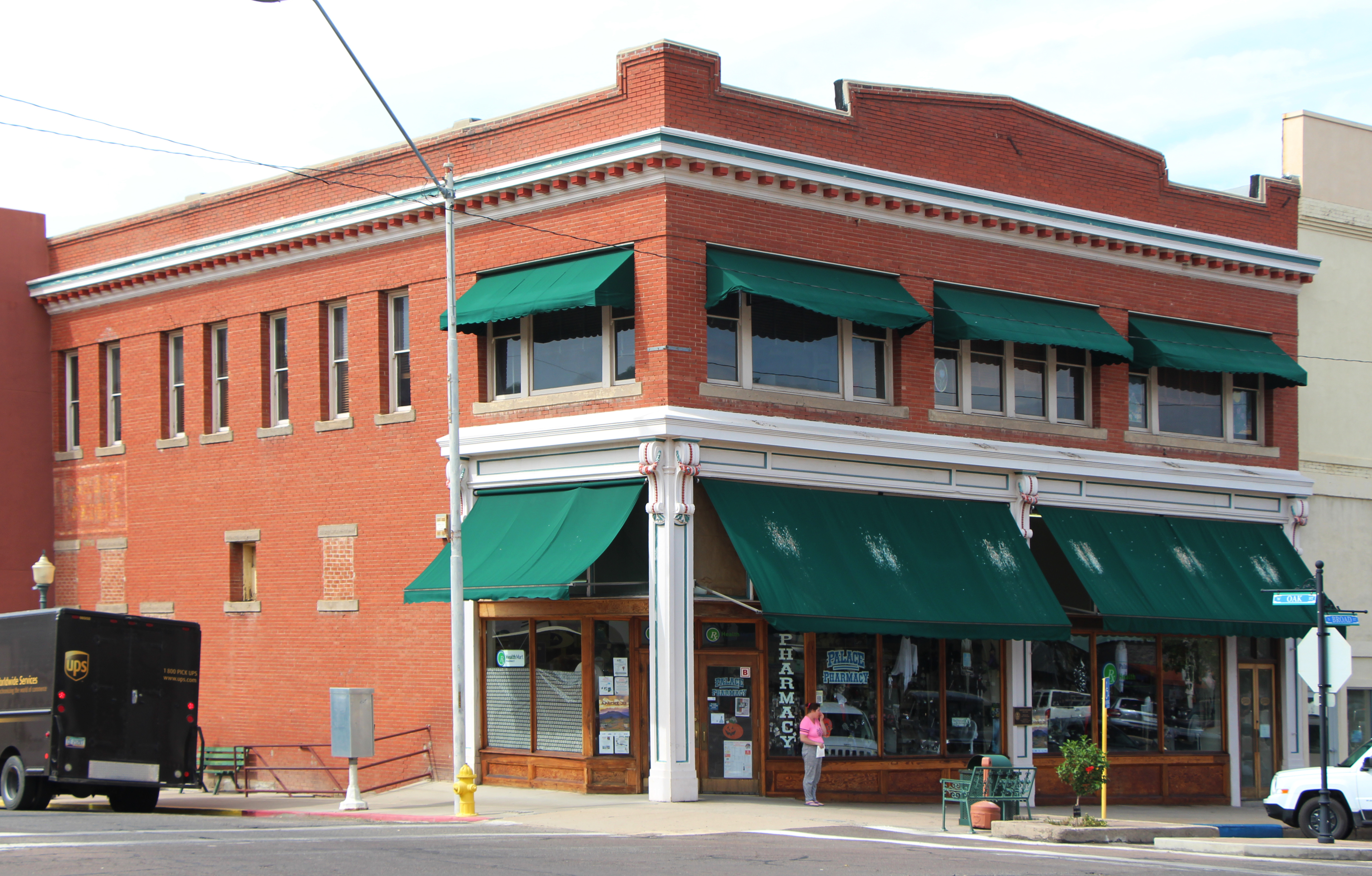
Amster Building

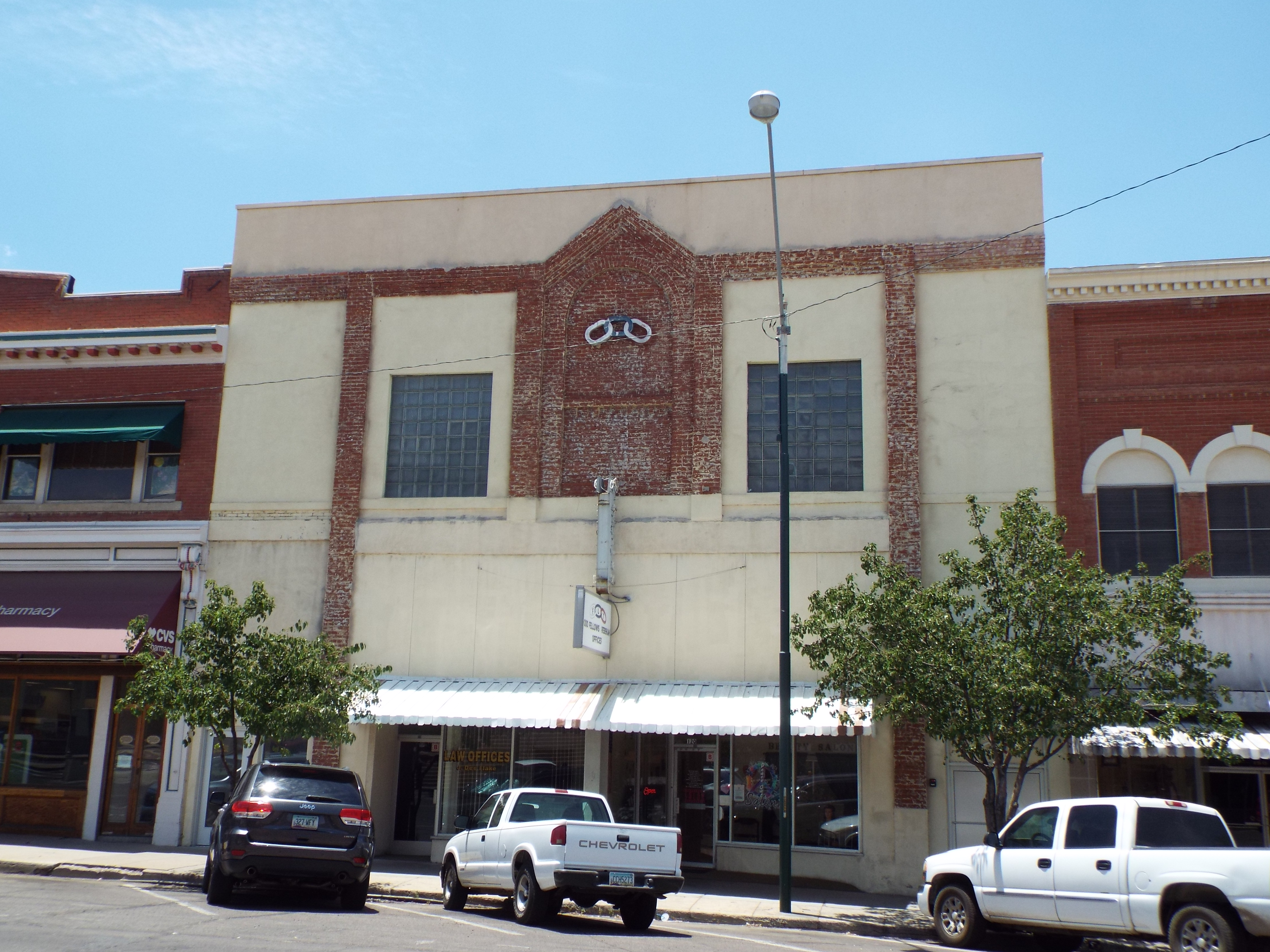
Odd Fellows Lodge Building

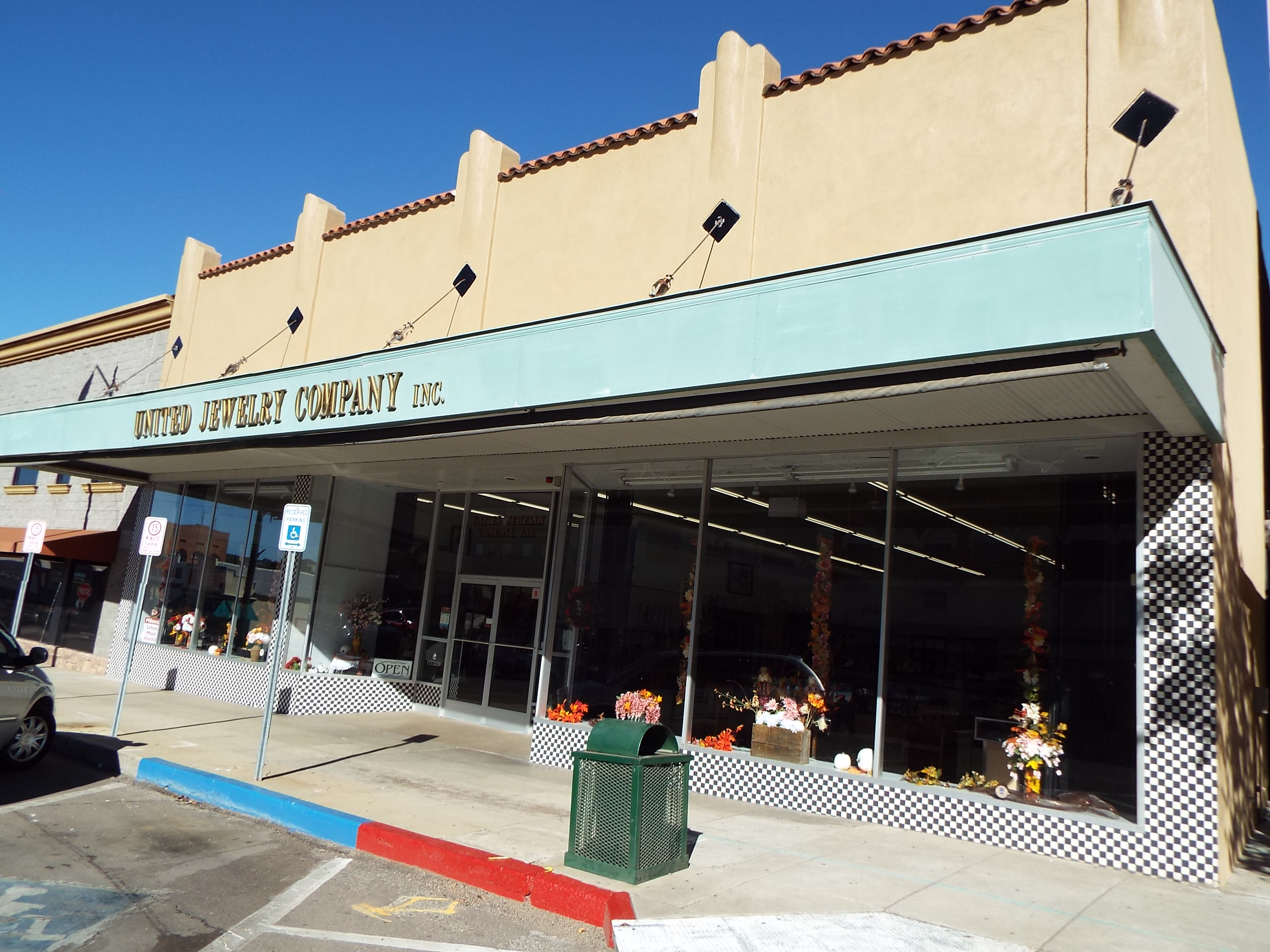
Sultan/Woolworth Building

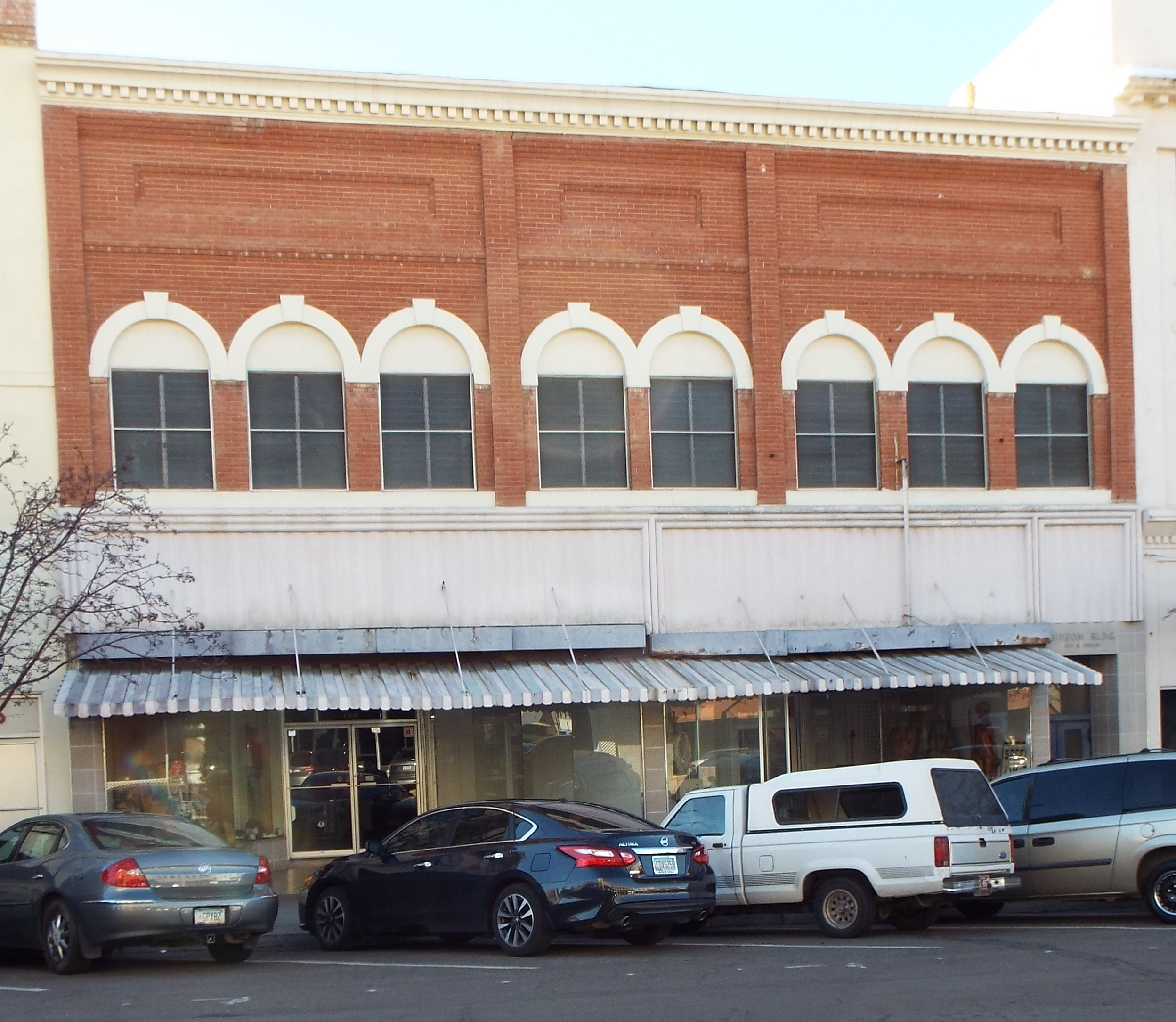
Hamil Building

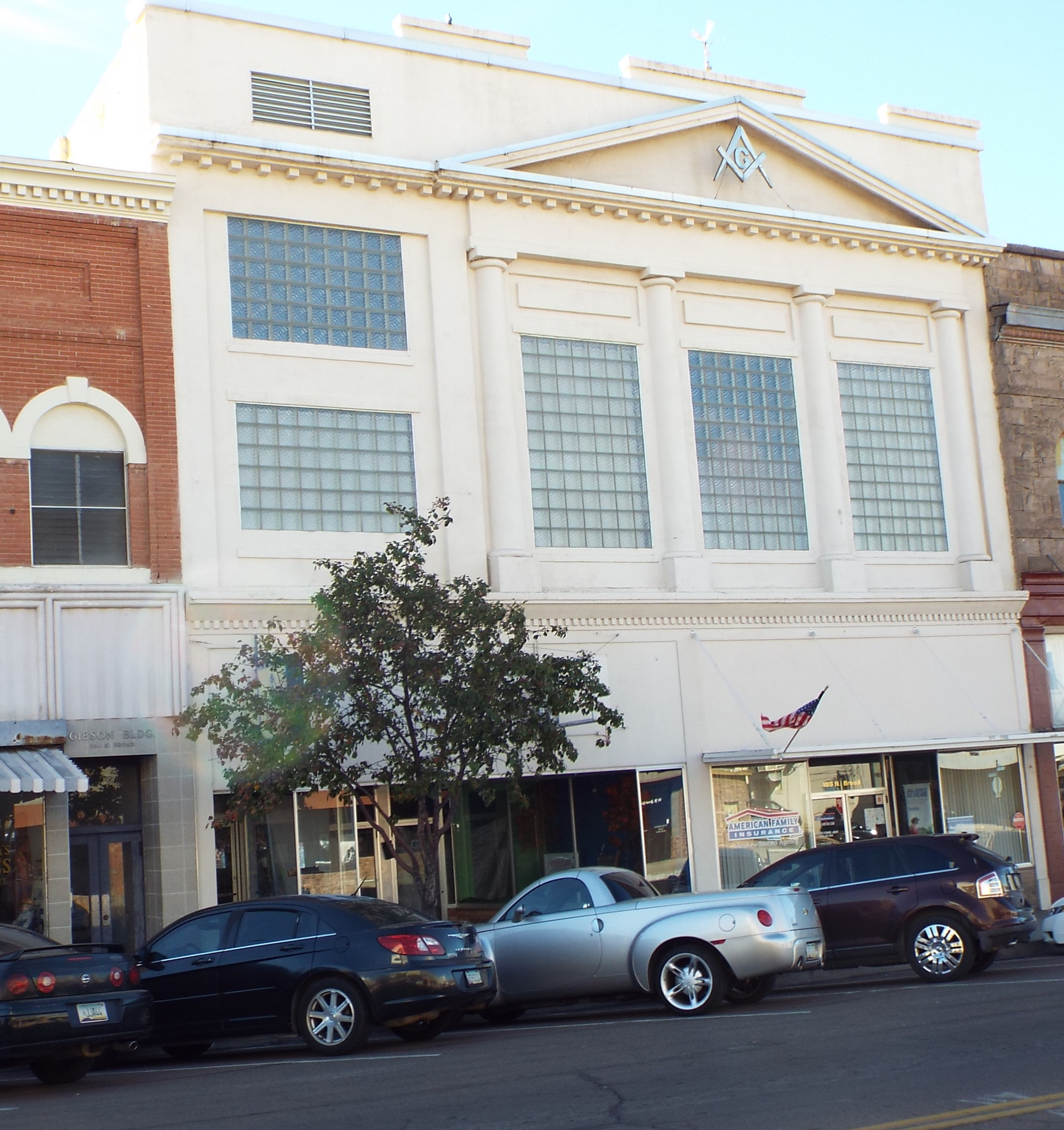
Masonic Temple

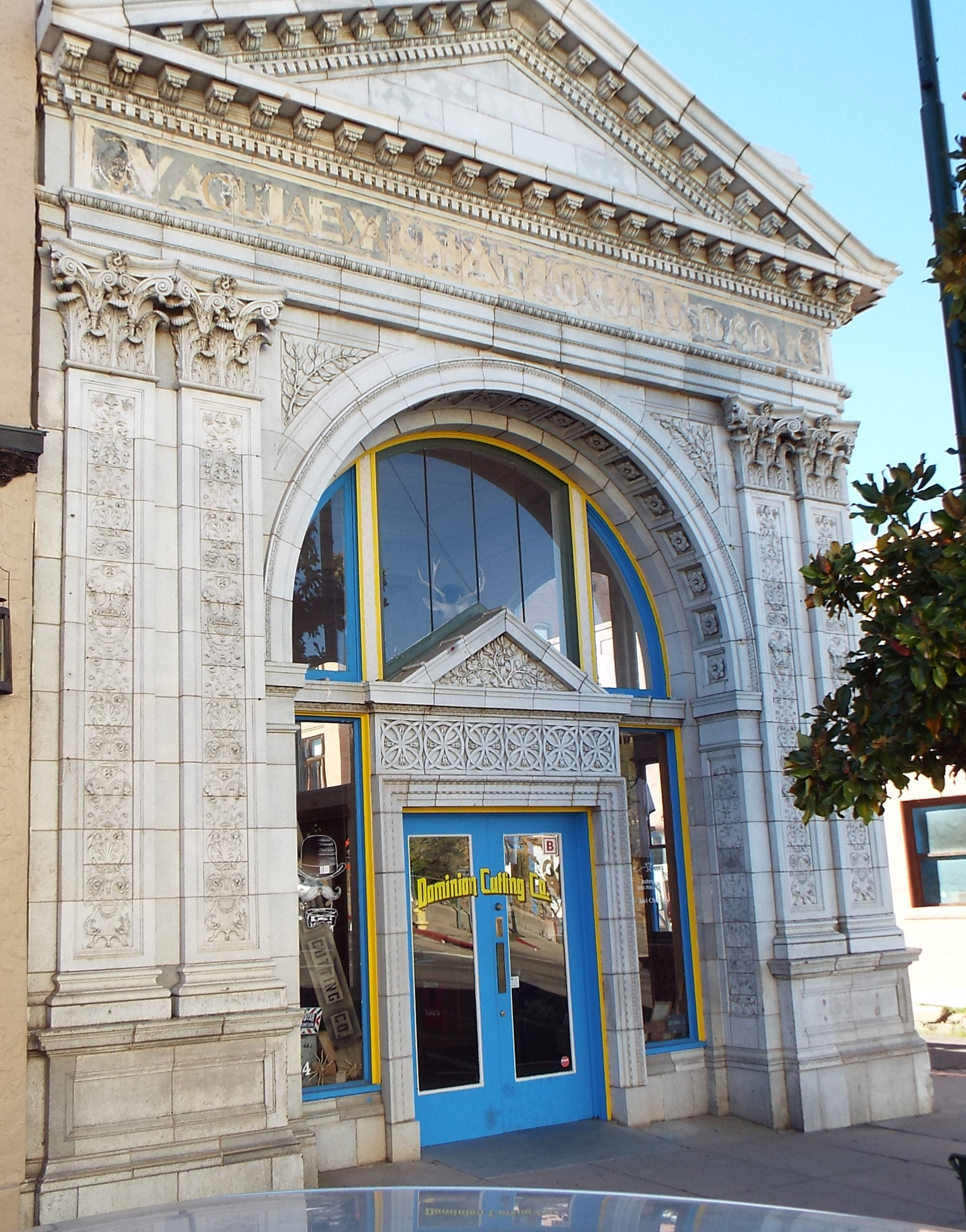
Gila Valley Bank and Trust Building

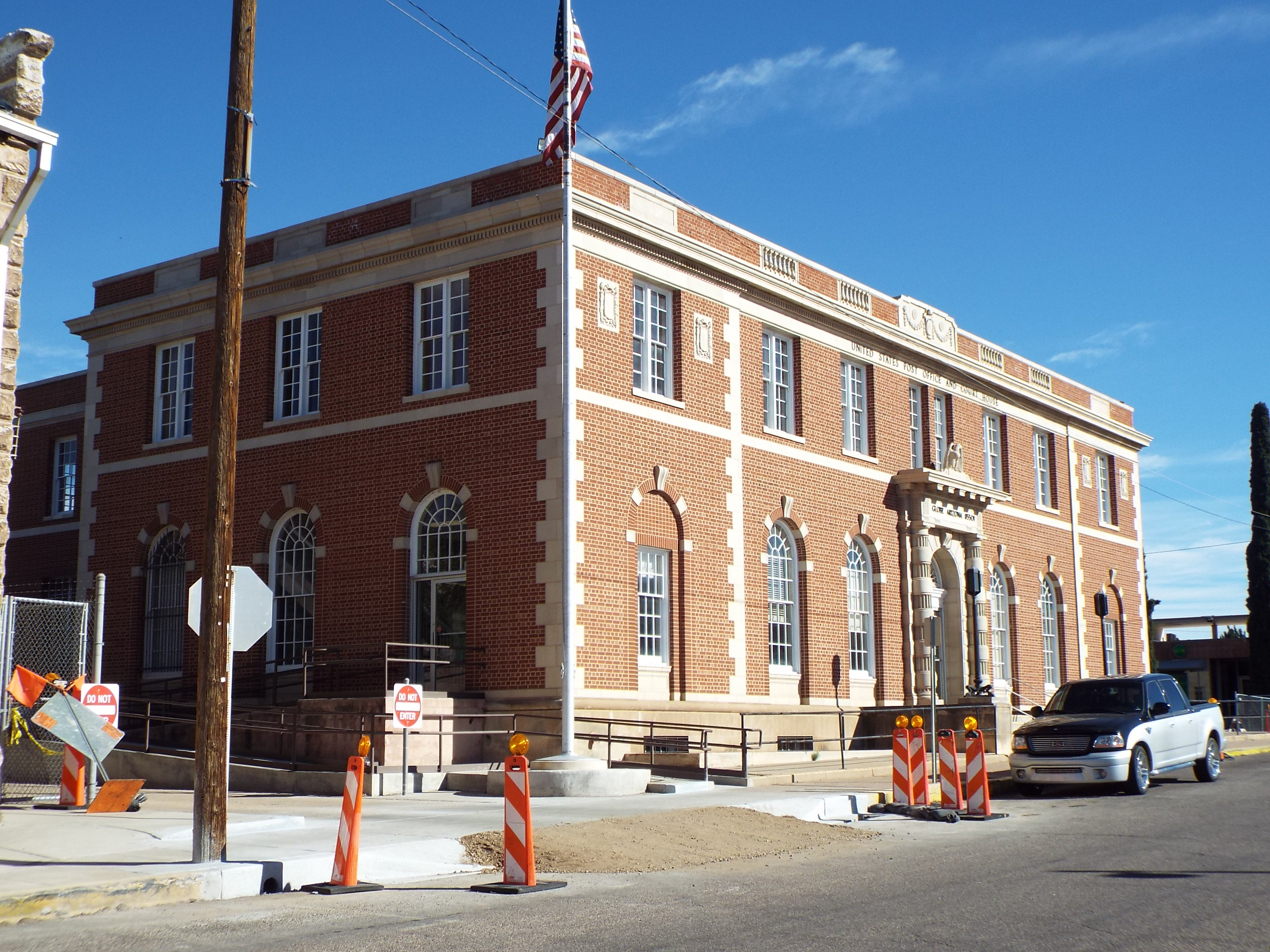
United States Post Office

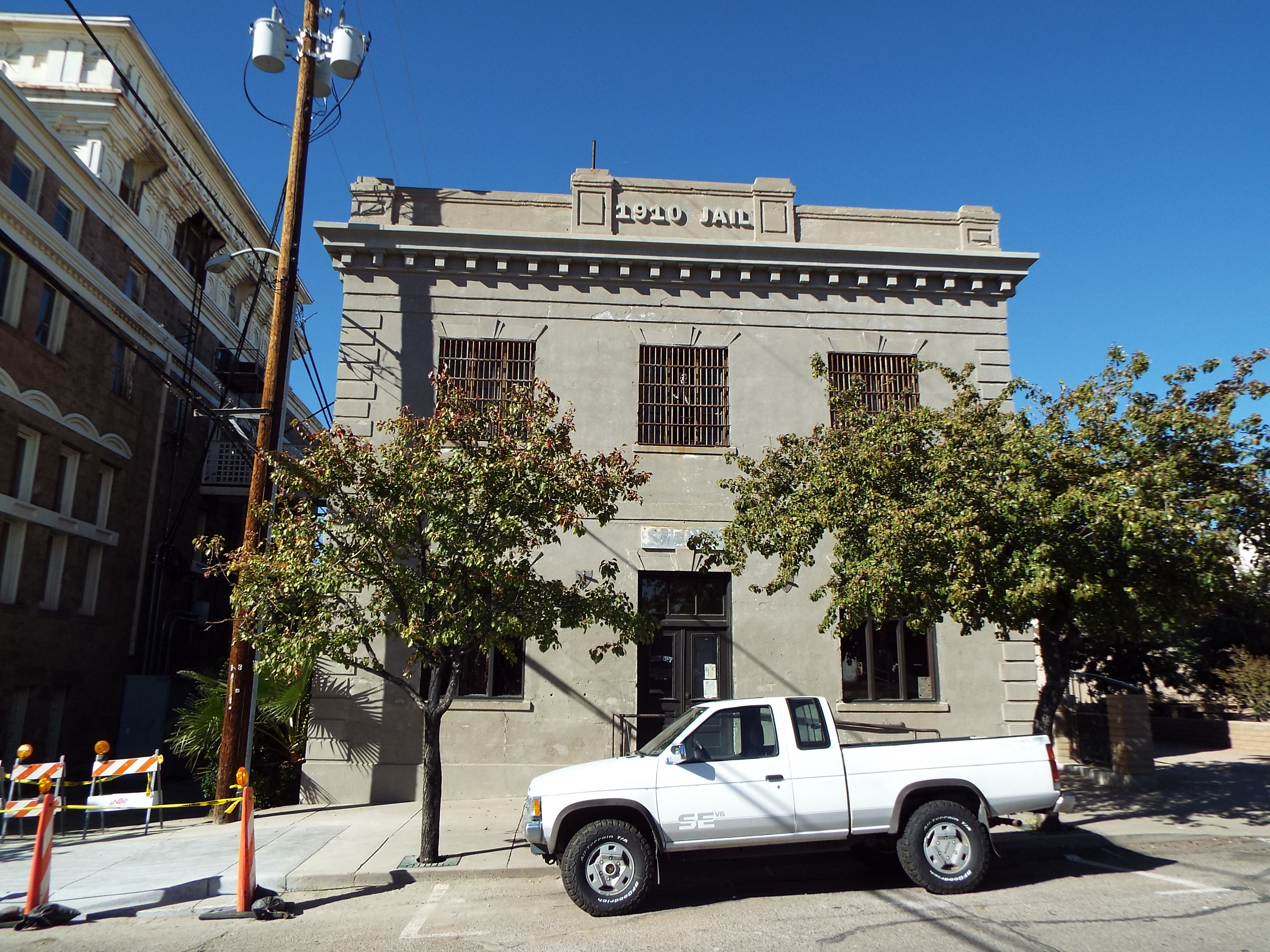
Globe Jail Building

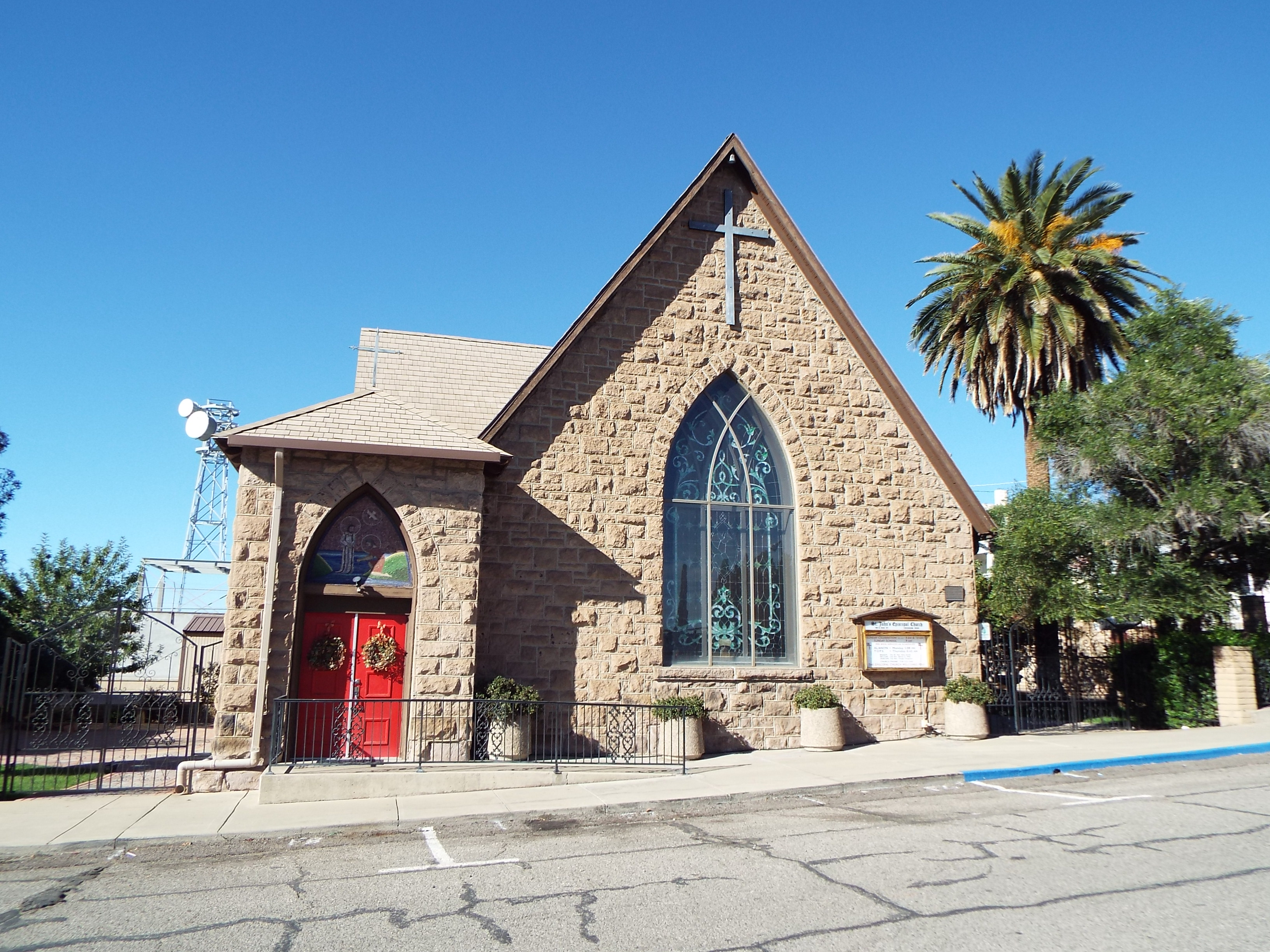
St. John’s Episcopal Church

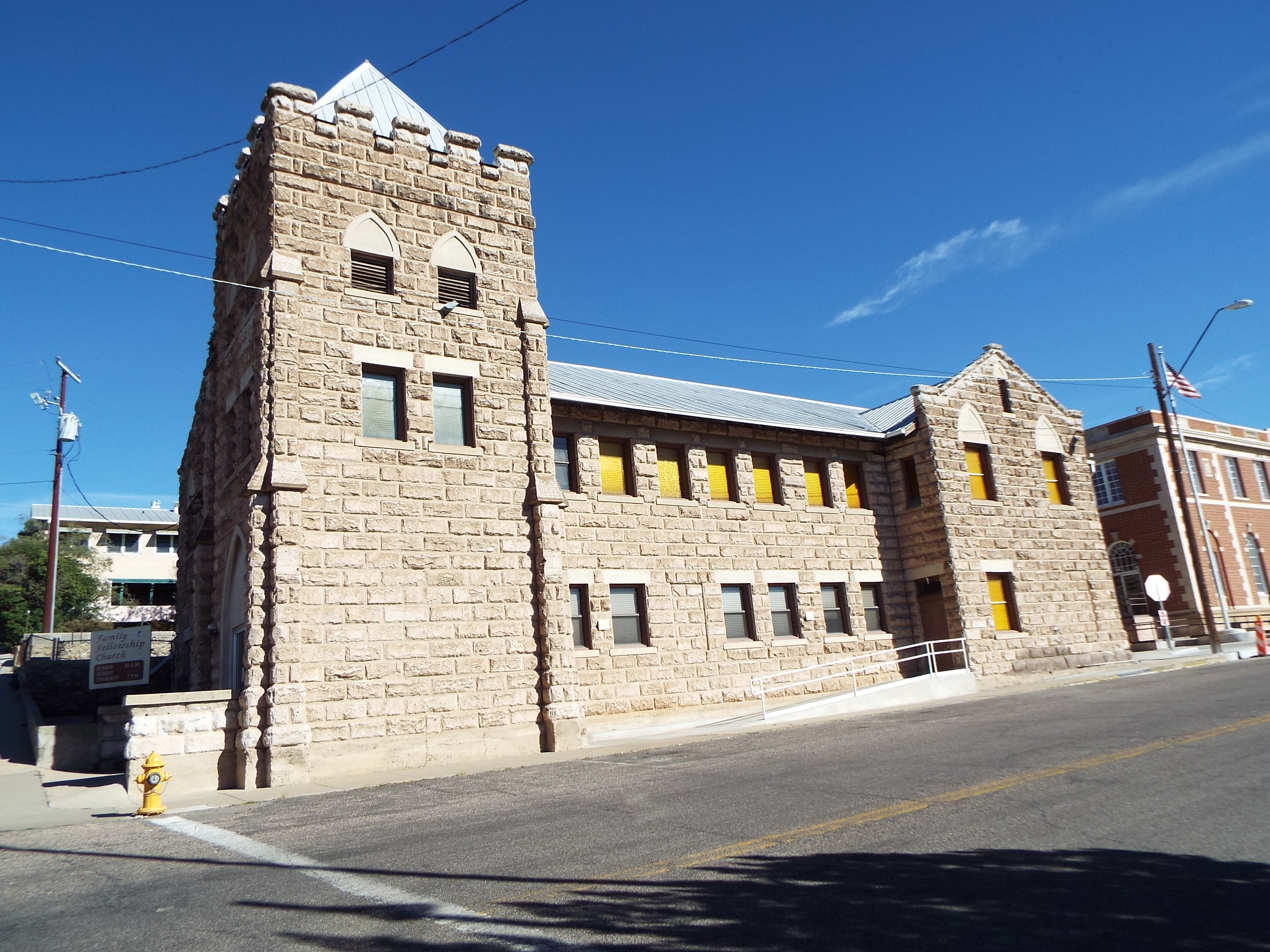
Family Fellowship Church

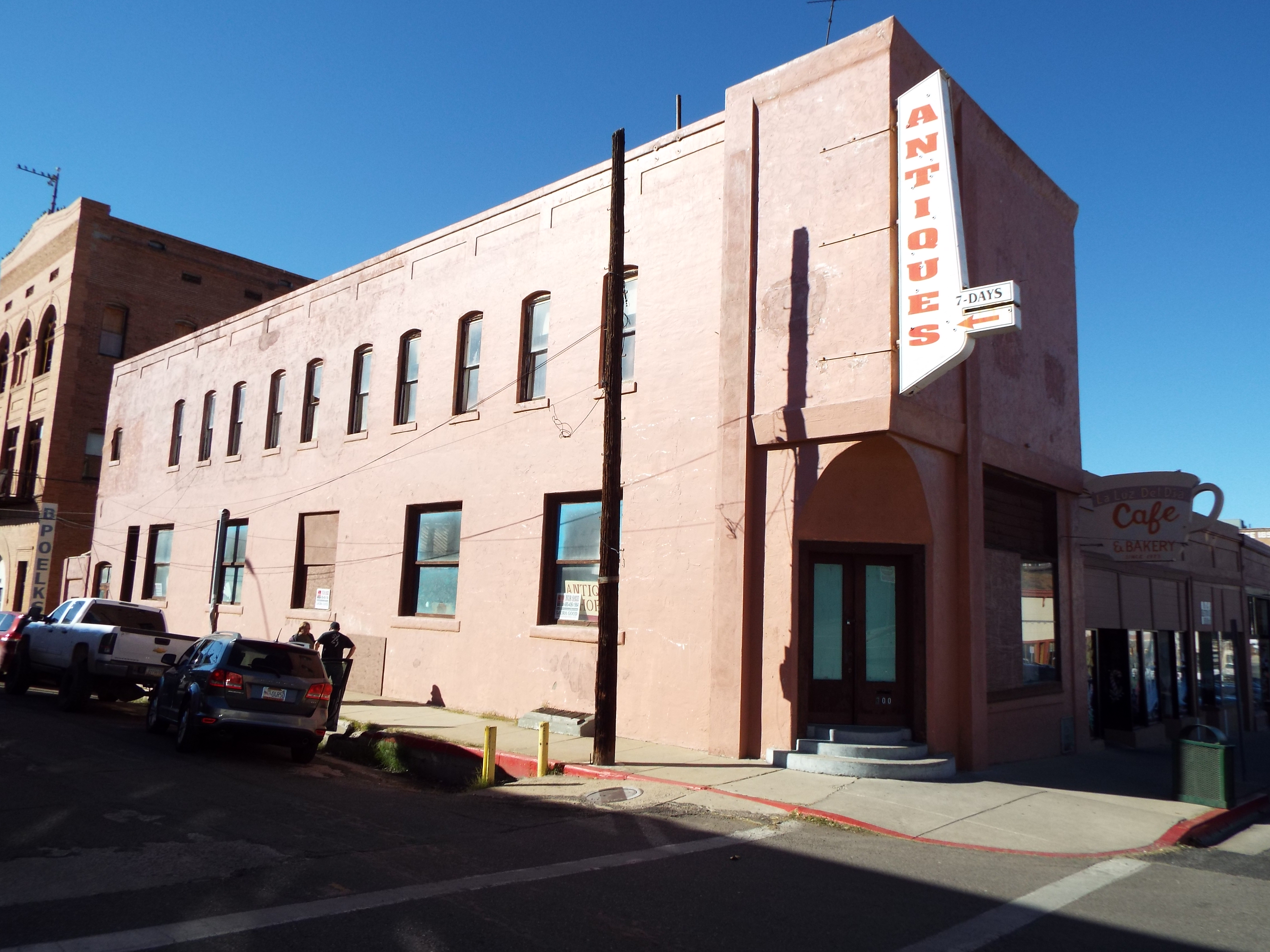
Butler Building

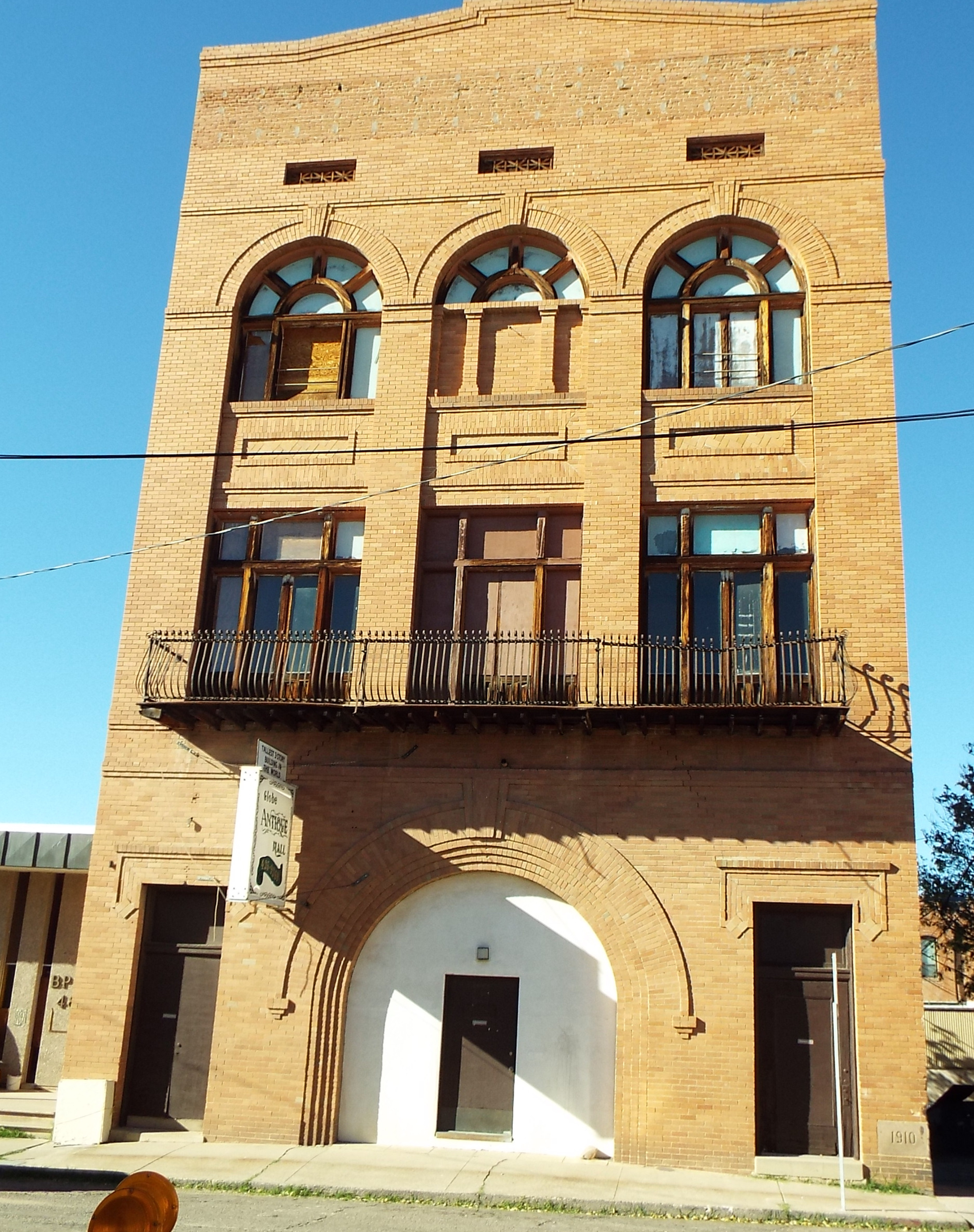
Elks Building

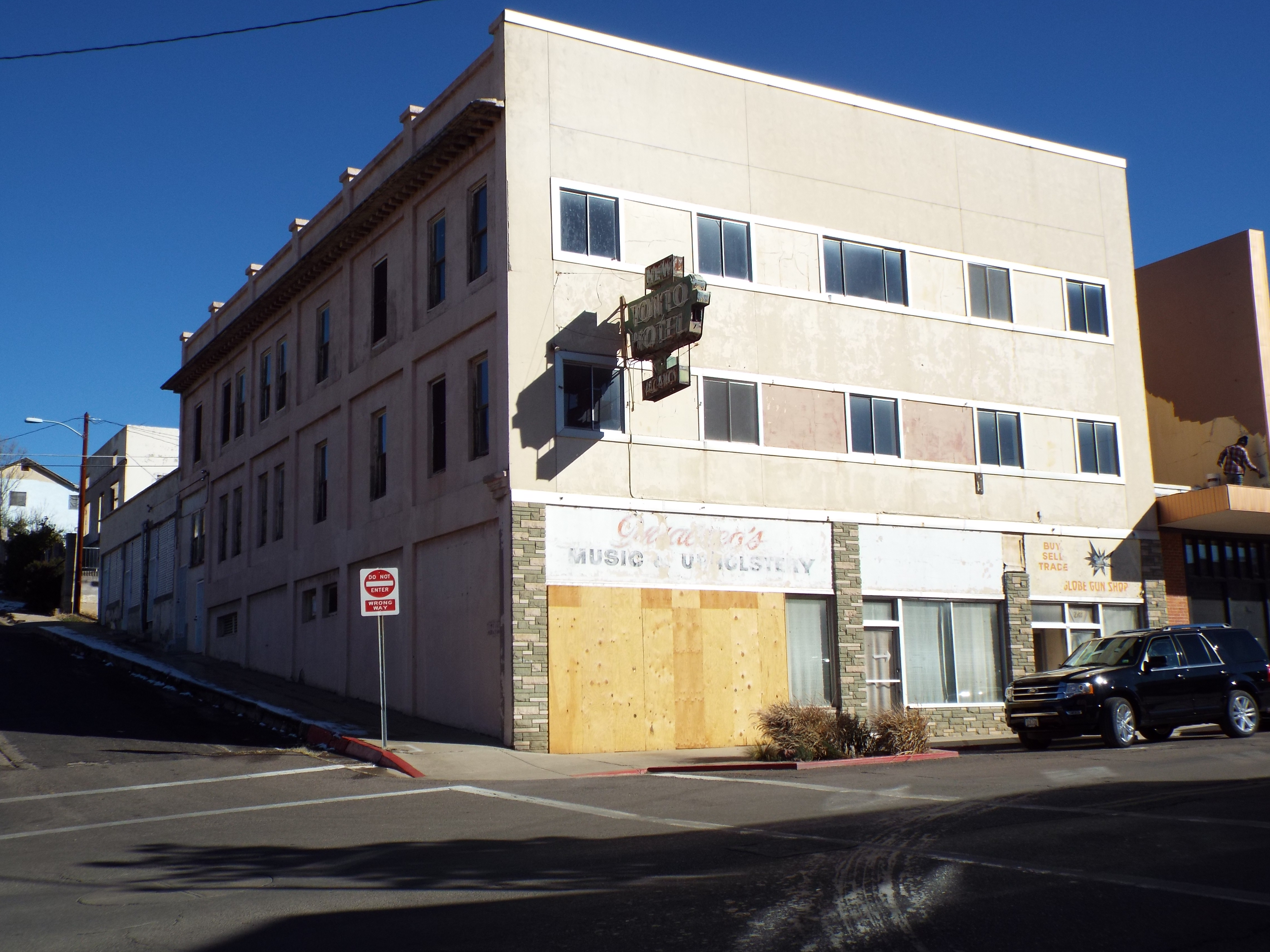
Murphy Hotel (Tonto Hotel)

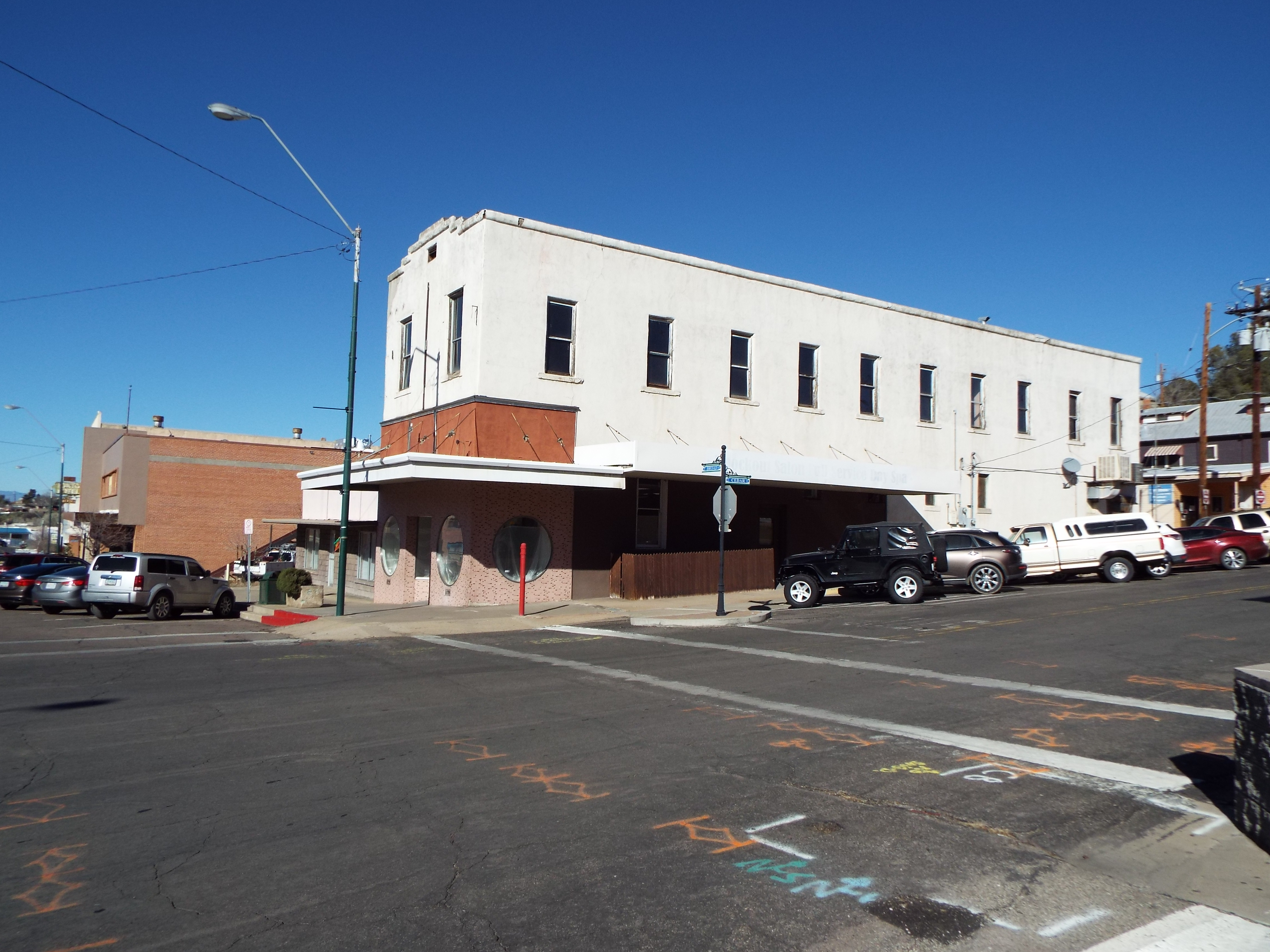
Ardon Hotel/Globe Bakery

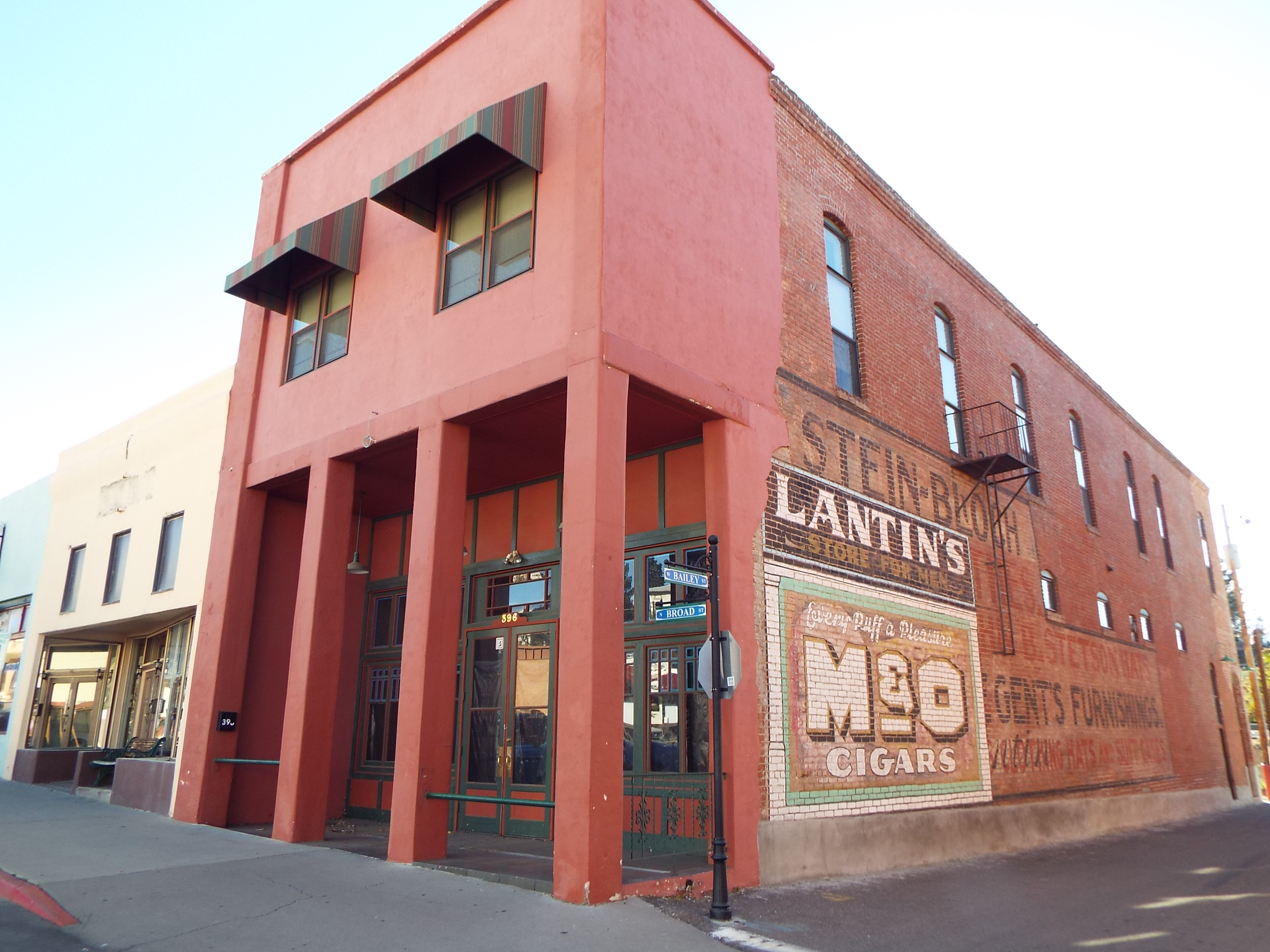
Cubito Jewelry Company

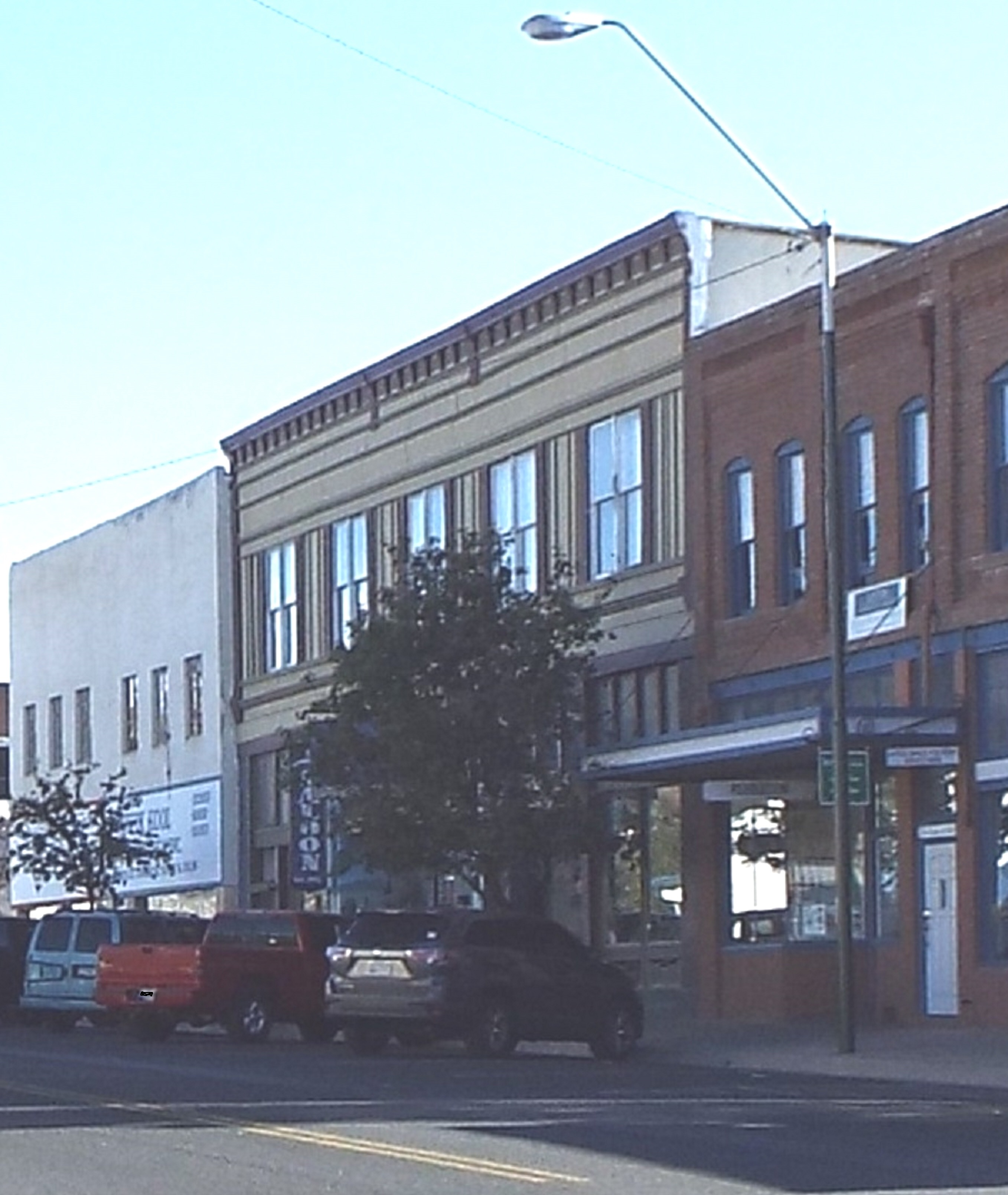
International House

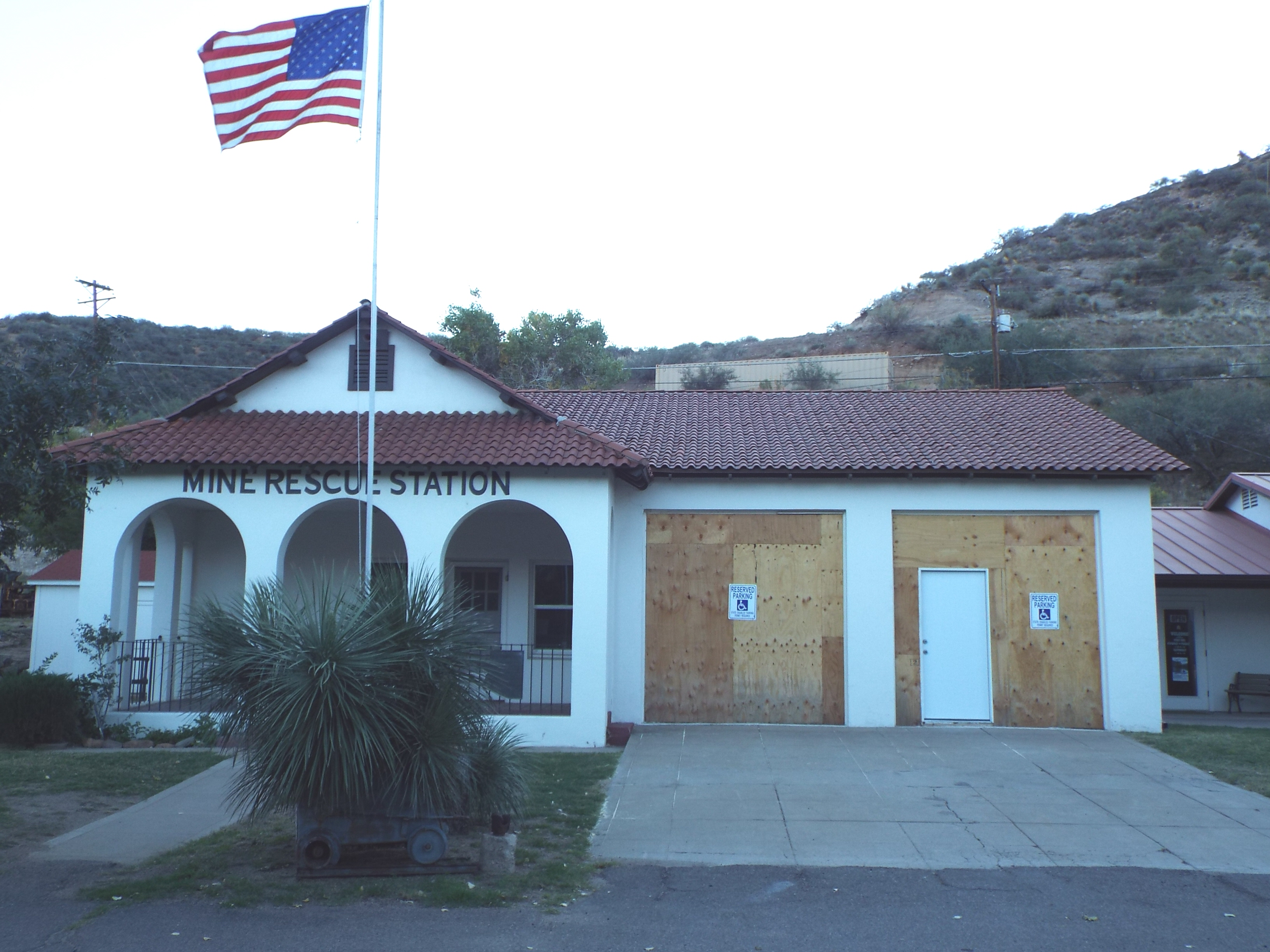
Gila Mine Rescue Station

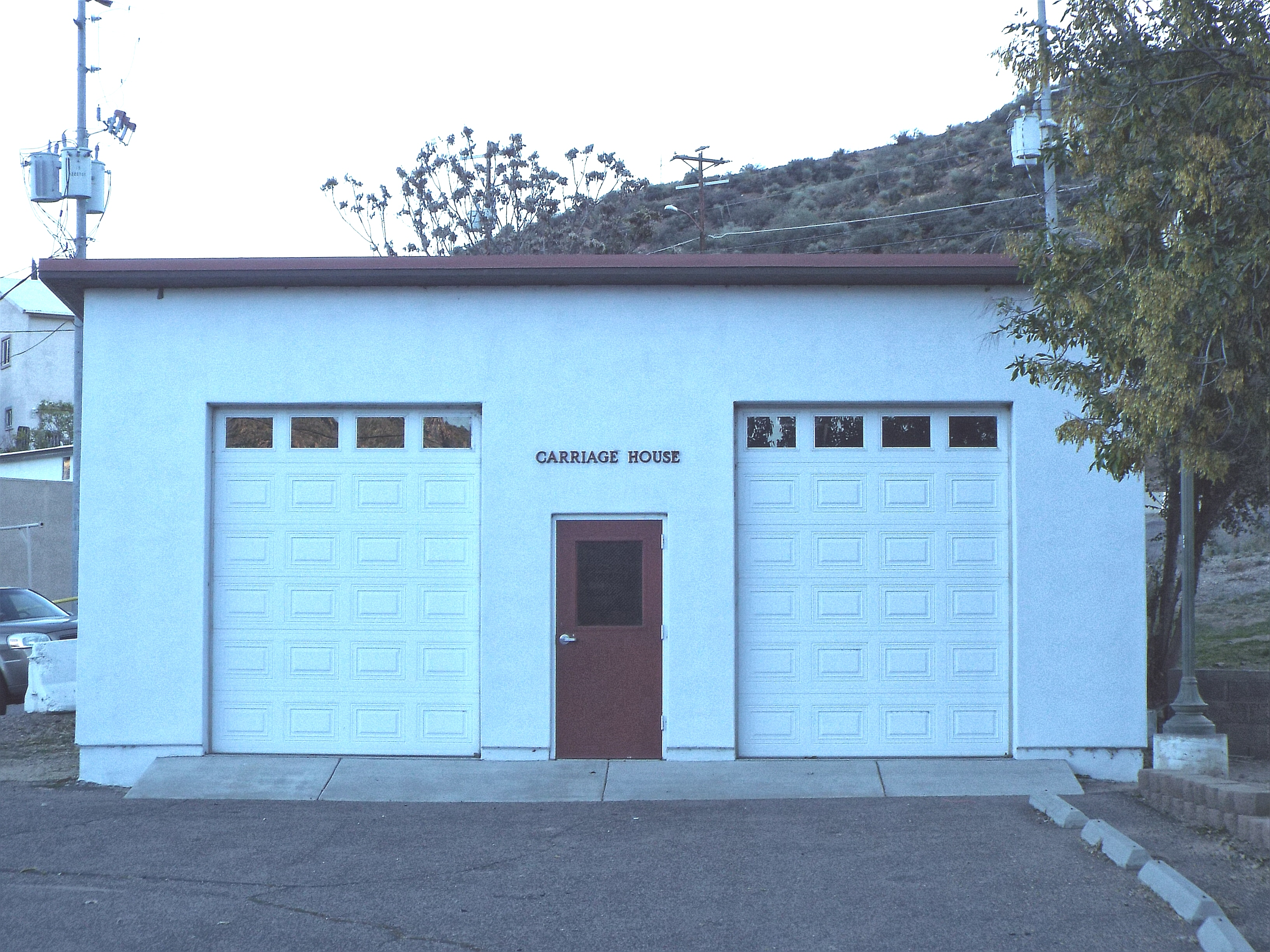
Gila Mine Rescue Station Carriage House

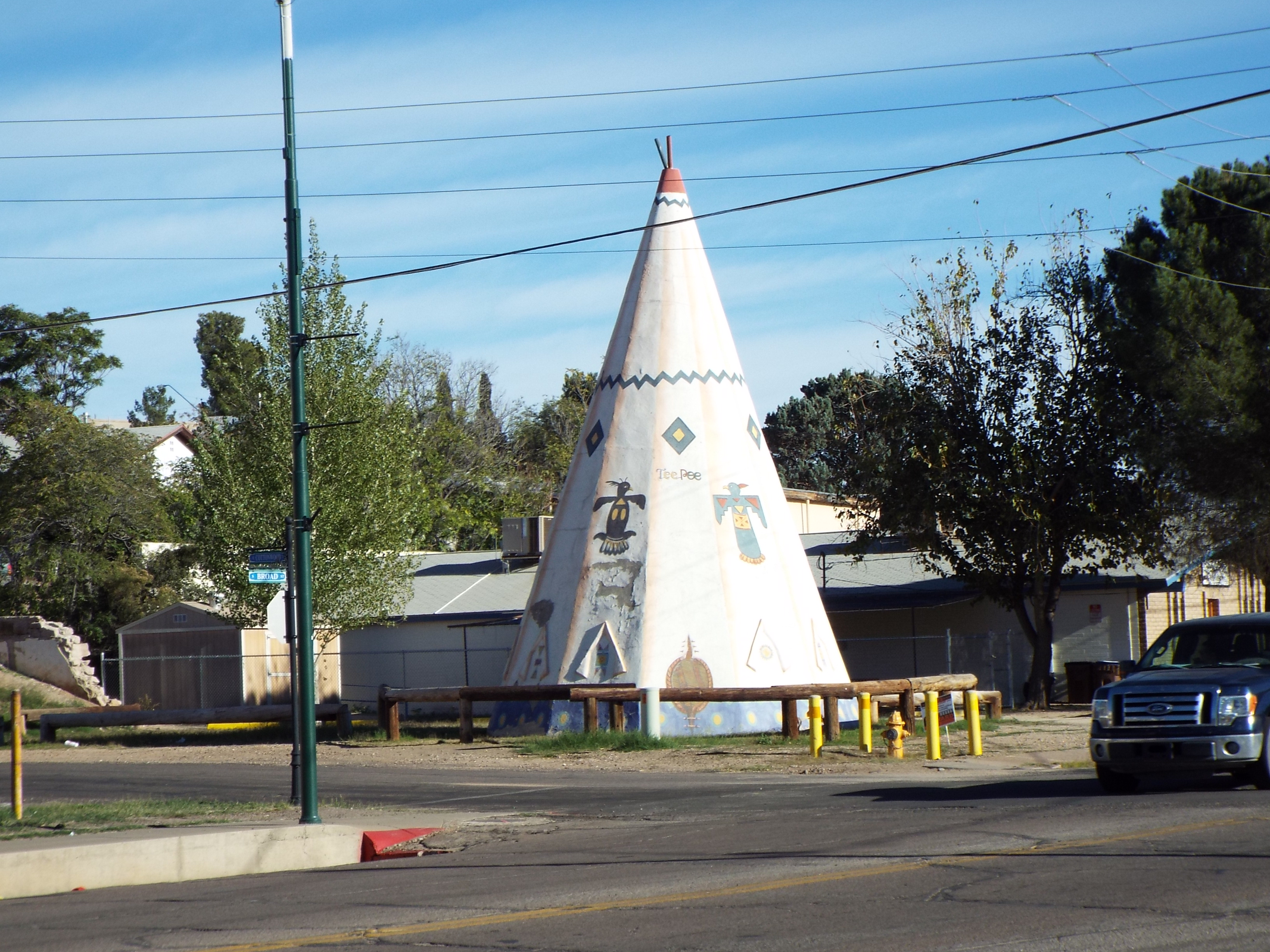
Teepee

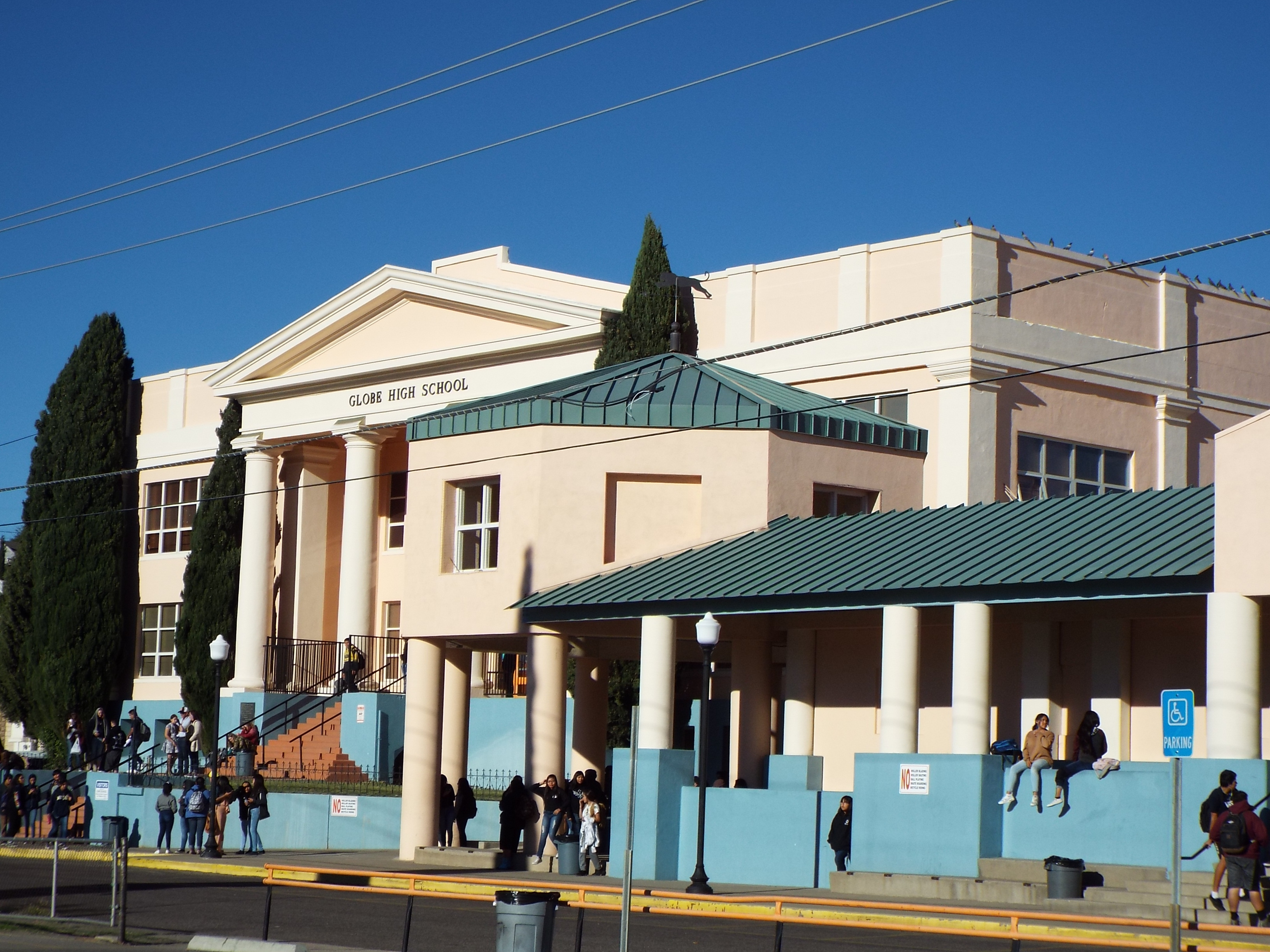
Globe High School

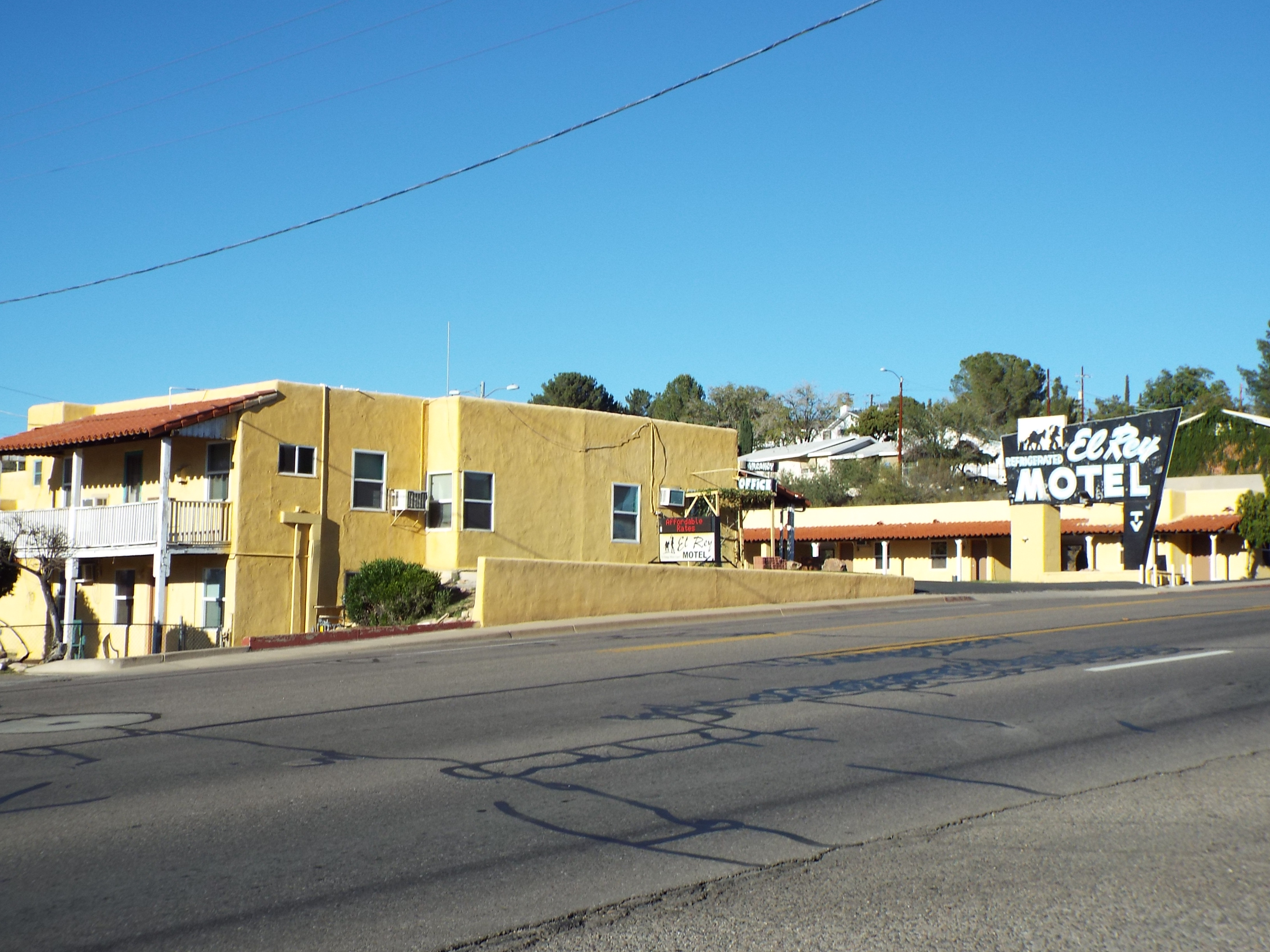
El Rey Motel

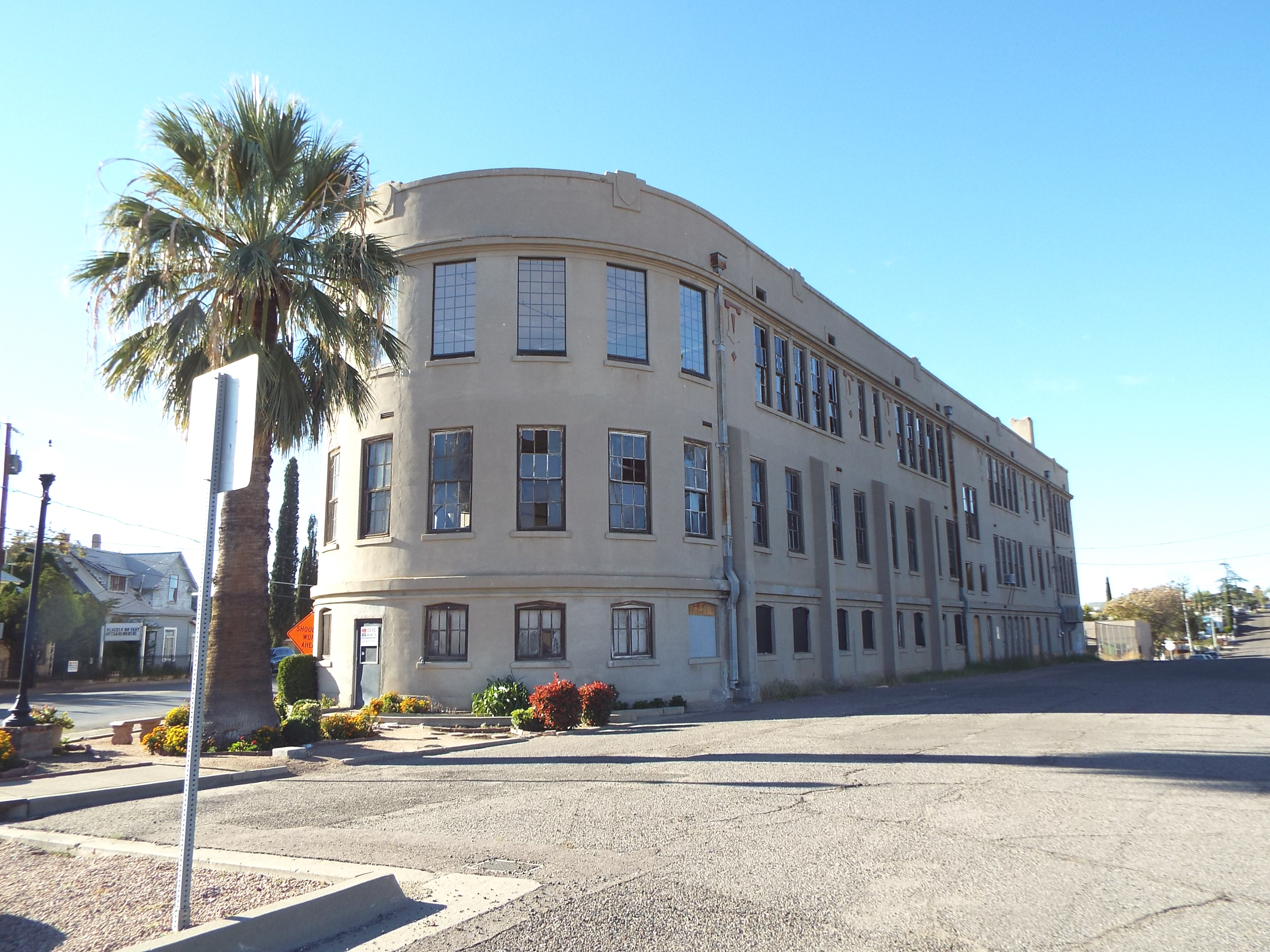
Hill Street School

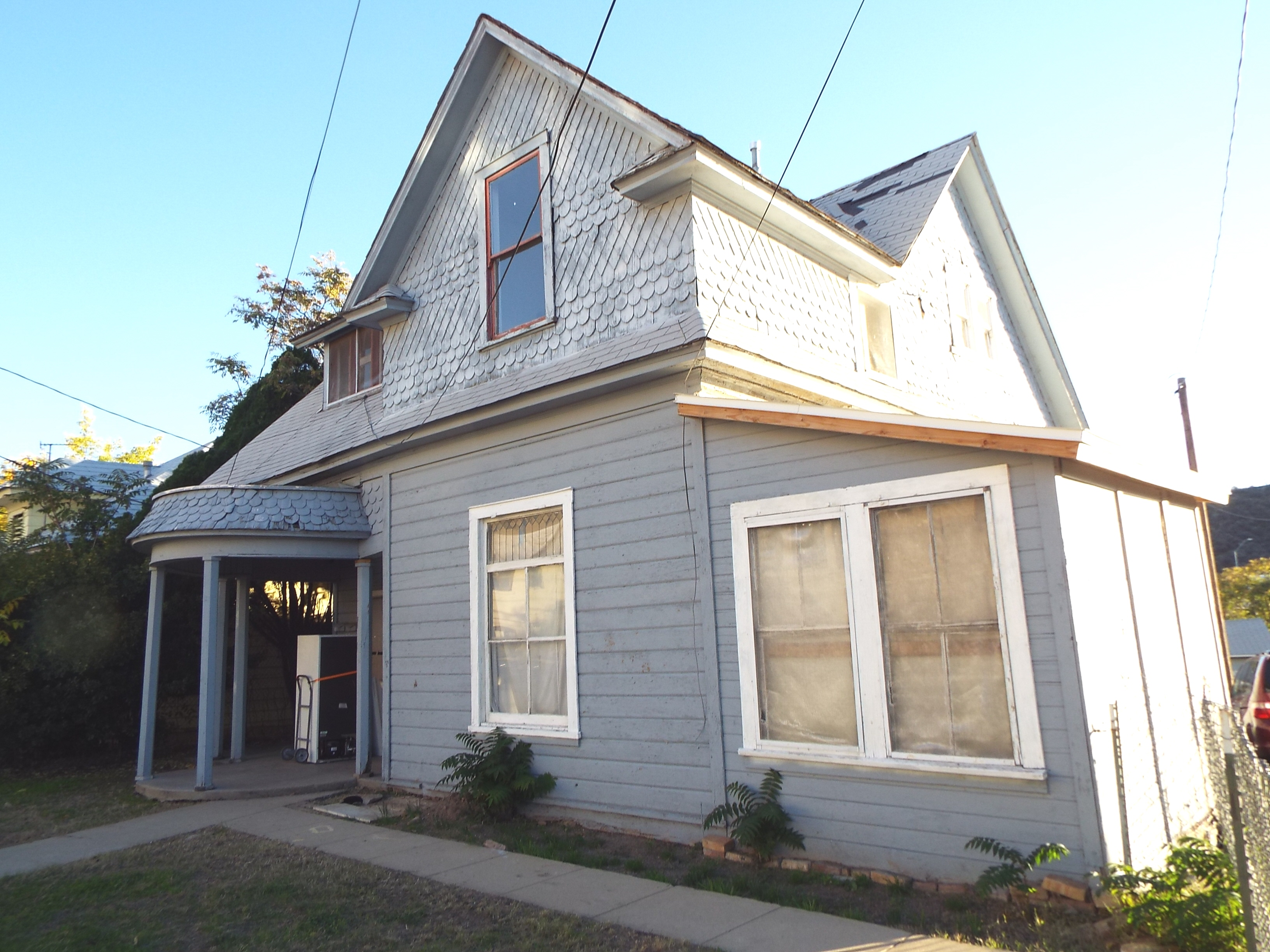
Victorian House

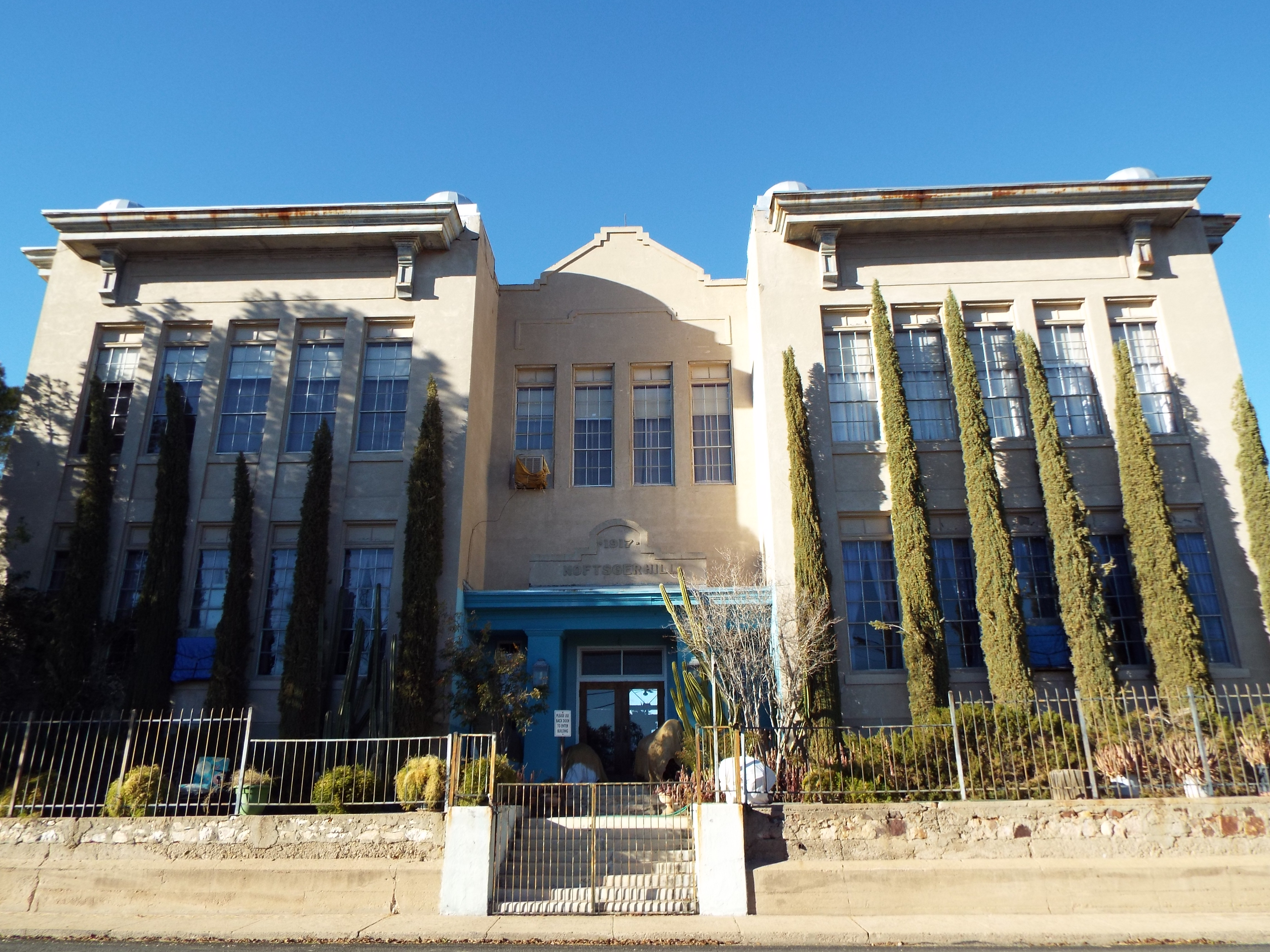
Noftsger Hill School

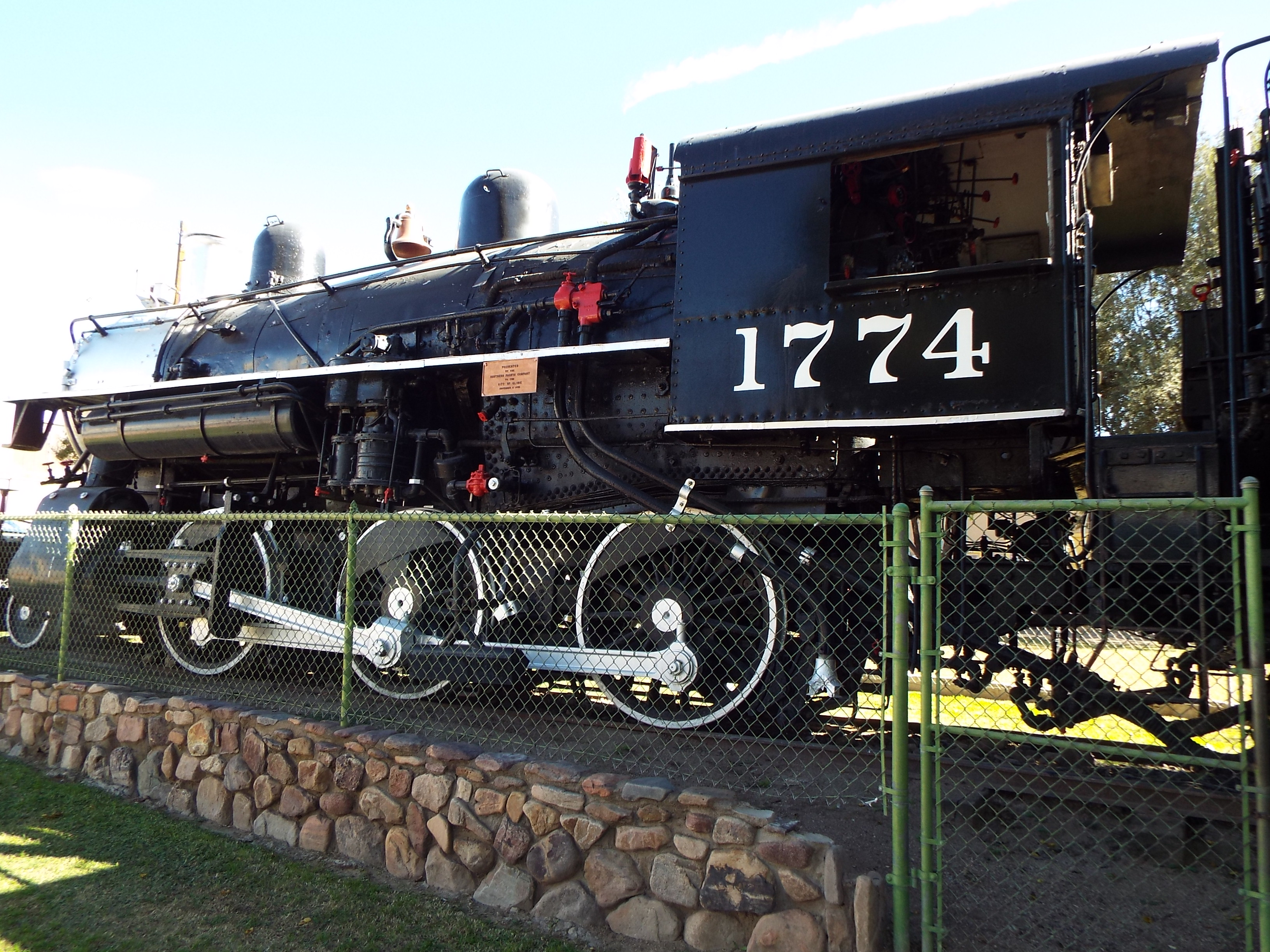
Steam Engine #1774

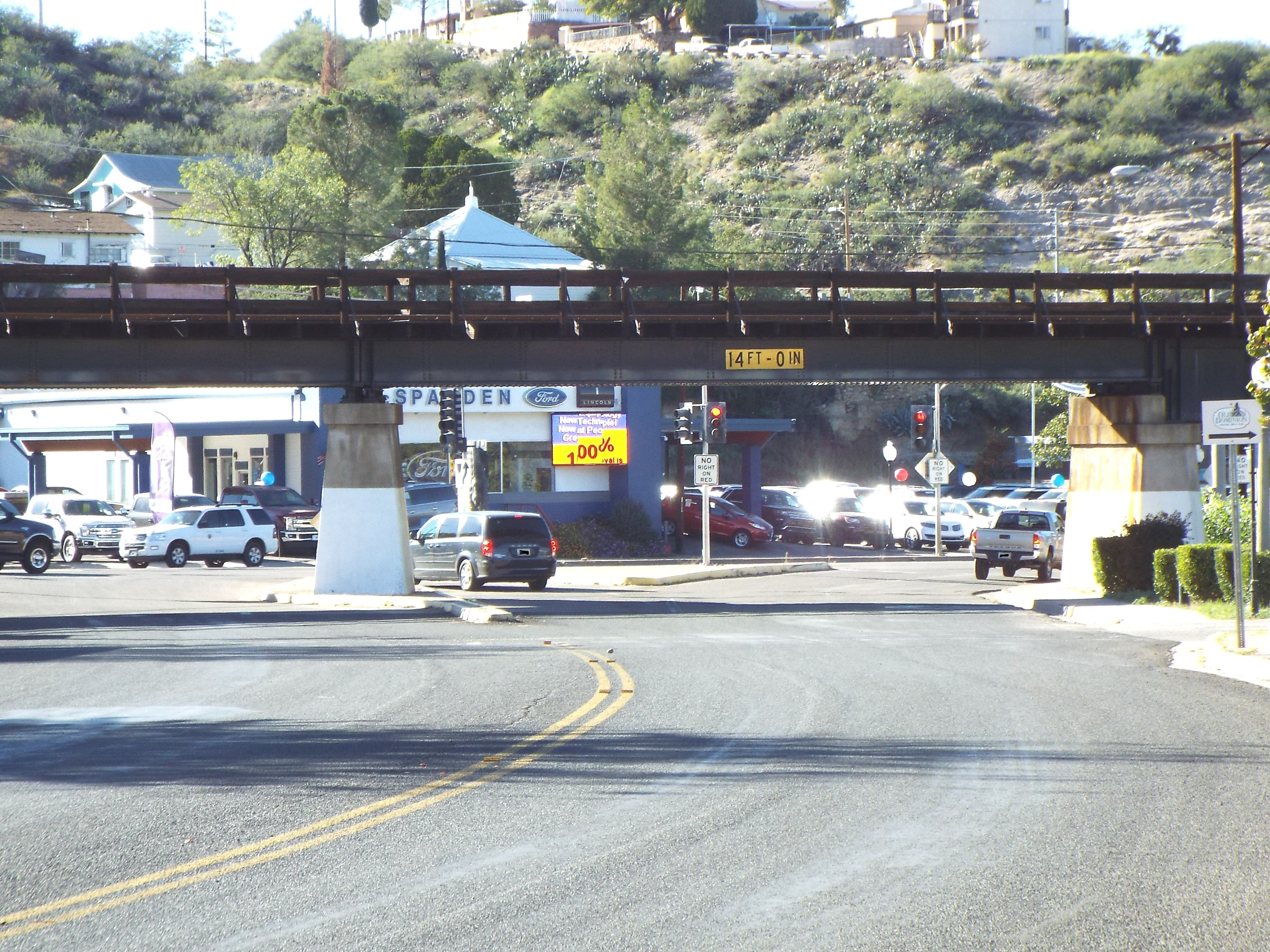
North and Broad Street Overpass

== See also ==
- National Register of Historic Places listings in Gila County, Arizona
