= Jicarilla War =

War between the Jicarilla Apaches and the U.S. military

- Part of the Apache Wars, Ute Wars, Texas-Indian Wars
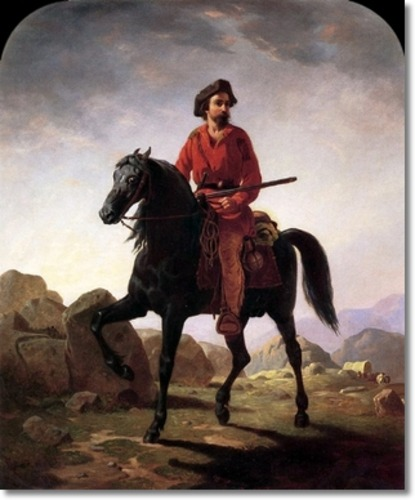
- Kit Carson in 1854 by William Ranney
Date	1849 – 1855
Location	New Mexico Territory, Texas
Result	United States victory

Belligerents
United States	Apache; Ute

Commanders and leaders
(United States) Philip St. George Cooke (United States) John Davidson (United States) Kit Carson	Lobo Blanco †; Flechas Rayada; Chacon

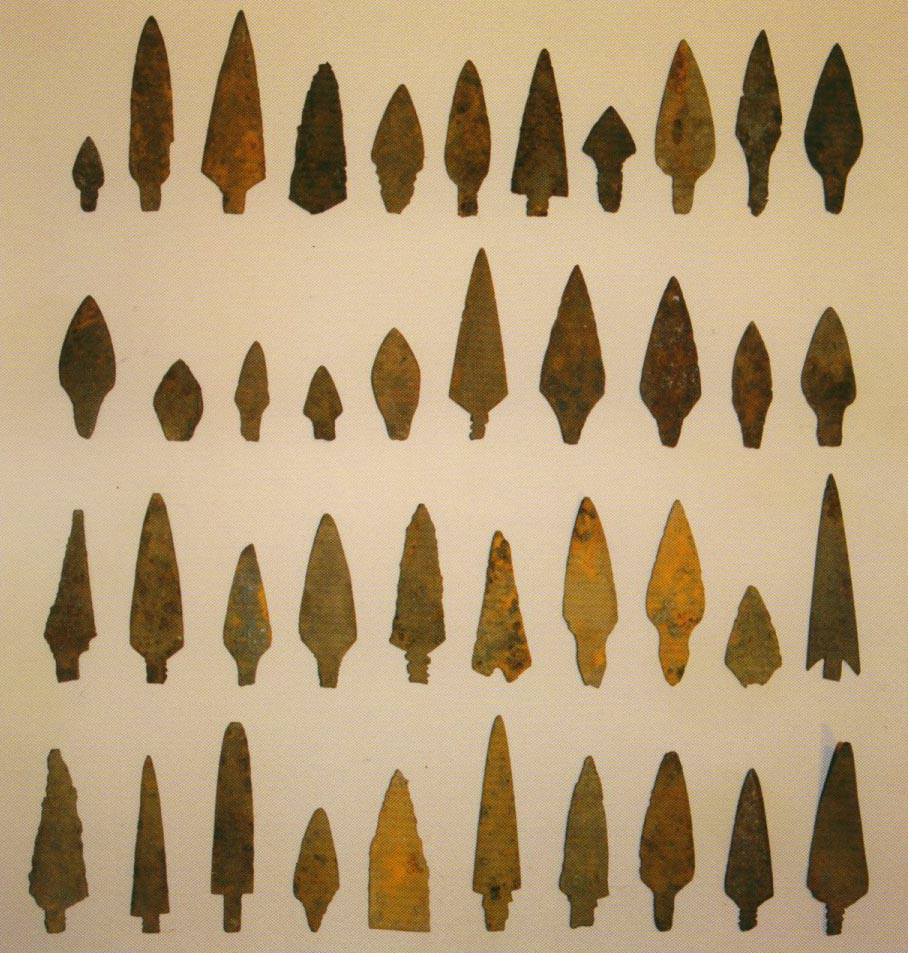
Arrowheads recovered from the Cieneguilla battlefield.

The Jicarilla War began in 1849 and was fought between the Jicarilla Apaches and the United States Army in the New Mexico Territory. Ute warriors also played a significant role in the conflict as they were allied with the Jicarillas. The war started when the Apaches and Utes began raiding against settlers on the Santa Fe Trail. Eventually, in 1853, the U.S. Army retaliated which resulted in a series of battles and campaigns that ended in 1854 when a large military expedition managed to quell most of the violence. However, some minor skirmishing continued into 1855.

== War ==
Dolores Gunnerson argues that "the Jicarillas would have transferred their allegiance to the Americans and served them as faithfully as they had served the Spaniards if the Anglos had been willing to accept them as "friends" and allies." She further states that "the Jicarilla were at war with the United States for only a year and a half and spent nearly all that period eluding the troops rather than fighting."

The war began in 1849 when a wagon of settlers was killed by a band of Jicarillas and Utes. The event, sometimes referred to as the White massacre, received considerable publicity at the time and did much to prejudice the Anglo population against the tribe. A year later a group of 10 mail carriers were killed in what is called the Wagon Mound massacre. Various incidents in the next half decade continued to raise tensions between the Americans and the Jicarillas, leading both sides to increasingly mistrust the other until the winter of 1853 to 1854 when the Army began operations.

In February 1854 a government beef contractor employed by the government of New Mexico reported to the Army that several of his cattle had been stolen by the Jicarillas so in response, a troop of dragoons from the 2nd Dragoons were sent to retrieve the stolen property. On March 5, Lieutenant Bell encountered a group of warriors under Chief Lobo Blanco on the Canadian River. It was uncertain whether Lobo Blanco and his followers were responsible for the stolen property, but the Army had long suspected Lobo Blanco's band of killing white and Hispanic settlers. A battle ensued which left the chief and four of his warriors dead while the Americans lost two men. On the next day, the conflict escalated when a band of Jicarillas and Utes raided a herd of cattle near Fort Union, killing two herdsmen in the process. After that the U.S. Army 1st Dragoons launched an expedition into Apacheria. The first engagement was fought on March 30 when First Lieutenant John Davidson's launched an unauthorized attack on a Jicarilla village near the present day Pilar, New Mexico. In the subsequent Battle of Cieneguilla, sixty American cavalrymen fought an estimated 250 Apaches and Ute warriors under the war chief Flechas Rayadas. Fighting began at around 8:00 am and lasted for over three hours, by the end of which, 22 soldiers were killed and another 36 were wounded. Davidson's command was forced to retreat having inflicted about 20 deaths on the Native force.

A week later on April 8, a large force of about 200 American cavalrymen, 100 men of the 3rd Infantry, and 32 scouts, found the Jicarillas of Chief Chacon in Ojo Caliente Canyon. During the battle that followed, commander Philip St. George Cooke defeated about 150 warriors, killing five of them and wounding six others without sustaining any casualties to his own command. The Jicarillas where dispersed at that point, and without a camp many of them died in the extreme cold weather. The battle was also notable for having involved Kit Carson, who guided the U.S. Army during the expedition, and First Lieutenant George Sykes, who later commanded the V Corps, Army of the Potomac, in the American Civil War. After the Ojo Caliente battle, the war was mostly over with the exception of a few smaller raids and skirmishes over the next several months.
