= List of American Indian Wars =

The American Indian Wars were numerous armed conflicts fought by governments and colonists of European descent, and later by the United States federal government and American settlers, against various indigenous peoples within the territory that is now the United States. These conflicts occurred from the 16^{th} to the 20^{th} centuries and in all parts of the country, beginning with the Tiguex War in 1540 in present-day New Mexico and ending with the Renegade period of the Apache Wars in 1924 in the Southwestern United States.

According to a dataset of conflicts between Native American communities and colonial powers, the frequency of conflict increased dramatically in Mexico and the United States during the second half of the 19^{th} century A.D., as contact between the two groups became more frequent.

== 16^{th} century wars ==
Conflict	Combatant 1	Combatant 2	Result
Battle of Mabila (Oct 1540)	Spanish conquistador Hernando de Soto	Mississippian Culture	Death of chief Tuskaloosa, over 2,500 Indians and 200 Spaniards
Tiguex War (winter 1540–41)	Spanish conquistador	Puebloan	
Mixtón War (1540-1542)	New Spain; Tlaxcaltec	Caxcanes	Assimilation or enslavement of all Caxcan natives, Spanish access to northern silver deposits
Chichimeca War (1550–90)	New Spain; Tlaxcaltec; Caxcanes	Chichimeca Confederation	Changes to Spanish indigenous policies, pursuit of voluntary conversion instead of forced conversions

== 17^{th} century wars ==
Conflict	Combatant 1	Combatant 2	Result
Navajo Wars (c. 1600–1866)	Crown of Castile (c. 1600–1716); Spain (1716–1821); Mexico (1821–48); United States (1849–66)	Navajo	Long Walk of the Navajo (1863–68); Navajos moved to reservations
Beaver Wars (1609–1701)	Haudenosaunee; England; Dutch Republic	Wendat (Huron); Erie; Neutral; Odawa; Ojibwe; Mississaugas; Potawatomi; Algonquin; Shawnee; Wenro; Mahican; Innu; Abenaki; Miami; Illinois Confederation other nations allied with France; France	Indecisive: Great Peace of Montreal; Wendat Confederacy destroyed
Anglo-Powhatan Wars (1610–46)	English colonists	Powhatan Confederacy	Treaty of Middle Plantation
Pequot War (1636–38)	Massachusetts Bay Colony; Plymouth Colony; Saybrook Colony; Connecticut Colony; Mohegan; Narragansett	Pequot	Pequot defeated; Treaty of Hartford
Kieft's War (1643–45)	New Netherland	Munsee	
Peach War (1655)	New Netherland	Munsee	
Esopus Wars (1659–63)	Dutch settlers Haudenosaunee	Esopus tribe of Lenape Indians	
Chowanoc War (1675–77)	Province of Carolina	Chowanoc	
King Philip's War (1675–78)	New England Confederation; Mohegan; Pequot	Wampanoag; Nipmuck; Podunk; Narragansett; Nashaway	Colonial victory in southern theatre; Native victory in northern theatre
King William's War (1688–97)	France; New France; Wabanaki Confederacy	England; Massachusetts Bay Colony (Kingdom of England) English America; Haudenosaunee	

== 18^{th} century wars ==
Conflict	Combatant 1	Combatant 2	Result
Queen Anne's War (1702–13)	France: New France; Spain: New Spain; Wabanaki Confederacy; Caughnawaga Mohawk; Choctaw; Timucua; Apalachee; Natchez	England (until 1707): (Kingdom of England) English America; Great Britain (from 1707): British America; Muscogee (Creek); Chickasaw; Yamasee	
Tuscarora War (1711–15)			Power of Tuscaroras broken; Tuscaroras retreat from the coast; Southern Tuscaroras migrate to New York
Fox Wars (1712–33)	(Kingdom of France) France	Fox: Meskwaki (Red Earth People); Renards; Outagamis	
Yamasee War (1715–17)	Colonial militia of: South Carolina; North Carolina; Virginia; Catawba (from 1715); Cherokee (from 1716)	Yamasee; Ochese Creeks; Catawba (until 1715); Cherokee (until 1716); Waxhaw; Santee	Power of the Yamasee was broken; South Carolina colonists establish uncontested control of the coast; The Catawba become the dominant tribe in the interior
Chickasaw Wars (1721–63)	Great Britain; Chickasaw	France; Choctaw; Illini	
Dummer's War (1722–25)	New England Colonies; Mohawk	Wabanaki Confederacy; Abenaki; Pequawket; Mi'kmaq; Maliseet	Dummer's Treaty
King George's War (1744–48)	France: New France; Wabanaki Confederacy	Great Britain: British America; Haudenosaunee	
Father Le Loutre's War (1749–55)	France: New France; Wabanaki Confederacy	Great Britain: British America	
Seven Years' War (1754–63)	Great Britain: British America; Prussia; Portugal (from 1762) (Province of Hanover) Hanover; Brunswick-Wolfenbüttel; Haudenosaunee; Hesse-Kassel; Schaumburg-Lippe	France: French Canada; (Habsburg monarchy) Holy Roman Empire: Austria; Saxony; Bavaria; Russia (until 1762); Spain (from 1762); Sweden (1757–62); Abenaki Confederacy; Mughal Empire (from 1757)	
French and Indian War (1754–63); Part of the Seven Years' War	Great Britain: British America; Haudenosaunee; Catawba; Cherokee (until 1758)	France: New France; Wabanaki Confederacy: Abenaki; Mi'kmaw militia; Algonquin; Lenape; Ojibwe; Odawa; Shawnee; Wyandot	
Anglo-Cherokee War (1758–61); Part of the Seven Years' War	Great Britain	Cherokee	
Pontiac's War (1763–66)	Great Britain	Odawa; Ojibwe; Potawatomi; Huron; Miami; Wea; Kickapoo; Mascouten; Piankeshaw; Lenape; Shawnee; Wyandot; Mingo; Seneca	Native Americans concede British sovereignty, but compel British policy changes; Portage around Niagara Falls ceded by Senecas to the British
Lord Dunmore's War (1774)	(Kingdom of Great Britain) Colony of Virginia	Shawnee; Mingo	
American Revolutionary War (1775–83)	United States (Kingdom of France) France; Spain; Vermont Netherlands Haudenosaunee: Oneida; Tuscarora; Watauga Association; Catawba; Lenape; Choctaw	Great Britain (Kingdom of Great Britain) Loyalists (Holy Roman Empire) German Auxiliaries Haudenosaunee: Mohawk; Onondaga; Cayuga; Seneca; (Cherokee Nation) Cherokee	Treaty of Paris; Britain recognizes the independence of the United States of America; End of the First British Empire
Cherokee–American wars (1776–94); Part of the American Revolutionary War	United States	(Cherokee Nation) Cherokee	
Second Cherokee War (1776); Part of the Cherokee–American wars			
Northwest Indian War (1785–95)	United States; Chickasaw; Choctaw	Western Confederacy (Kingdom of Great Britain) Great Britain: (Kingdom of Great Britain) British North America	Treaty of Greenville; British withdrawal; American occupation of the Northwest Territory
Oconee War (1785–94)	European colonists	Muscogee	

== 19^{th} century wars ==
Conflict	Combatant 1	Combatant 2	Result
Battle of Sitka (1804)	Russia	Tlingit Kiks.ádi Clan	The "Sitka Kiks.ádi Survival March" commences
Tecumseh's War (1810–13); Part of the War of 1812	United States	Tecumseh's Confederacy	Peace treaty
War of 1812 (1812–15)	United States; Choctaw Nation; Cherokee; Creek Allies	(British Empire) United Kingdom: (British Empire) British North America; Tecumseh's Confederacy; Spain (1814)	Treaty of Ghent; Defeat of Tecumseh's Confederacy; U.S. nationalism strengthened
Peoria War (1813); Part of the War of 1812			
Creek War (1813–14); Part of the War of 1812	United States; Choctaw Nation; Lower Creeks; Cherokee	Red Stick Creek	Treaty of Fort Jackson
First Seminole War (1817–18)	United States	Seminole (Spain) Spanish Florida	
Texas–Indian wars (1820–75); Part of the Apache Wars	Republic of Texas; United States	Comanche	
Arikara War (1823)	United States	Arikara	The Arikara eventually settled with the Mandan and Hidatsa on the Fort Berthold Reservation in North Dakota
Winnebago War (1827)	United States	Prairie La Crosse Ho-Chunks with a few allies	Ho-Chunks cede lead mining region to the United States
Black Hawk War (1832)	United States; Ho-Chunk; Menominee; Dakota; Potawatomi	Black Hawks British Band; Ho-Chunk and Potawatomi allies	
Second Seminole War (1835–42)	United States	Seminole	3,800 Seminoles transported to the Indian Territory; 300 remain in Everglades
Second Creek War (1836)			
Comanche Wars (1836–75); Part of the Texas–Indian wars	Spain; Mexico; Republic of Texas; United States; Choctaw Nation	Comanche	
Osage Indian War (1837)		Osage Nation	
Cayuse War (1847–55)	United States	Cayuse	
Ute Wars (1849–1923)	United States	Ute; Paiute; Navajo; Apache	Utes moved to reservations
Apache Wars (1849–1924); Part of the Texas–Indian wars	United States (1849–1924) Confederate States (1861–65)	Apache; Ute; Yavapai; Comanche; Cheyenne; Kiowa; Havasupai; Hopi; Navajos; Papagos; Hualapai; Yuma; Mohave	Apaches moved to reservations; American Indian Wars conclude with Renegade period
Jicarilla War (1849–55); Part of the Apache, Ute and Texas-Indian Wars	United States	Apache; Ute	
Yuma War (1850–53)	United States Cupeno (1852–53) Cocopah (1853); Paipai; Halyikwamai; Mountain Cahuilla (1851)	Yuma; Mohave; Cocopah (1850–53) Cahuilla; Cupeno (1851)	
Mariposa War (1850–51)			
Walker War (1853); Part of the Ute Wars			
Sioux Wars (1854–91)	United States (Canada) Canada; Crow; Pawnee; Eastern Shoshone	Sioux: Lakota; Dakota; Cheyenne; Arapaho; Kiowa; Comanche	
First Sioux War (1854–56); Part of the Sioux Wars			
Klickitat War (1855)	United States	Klickitat; Cascade	
Rogue River Wars (1855–56)	United States	Rogue River people	Indians relocated to Siletz, Grand Ronde and Coast Reservations
Third Seminole War (1855–58)	United States	Seminole	
Yakima War (1855–58)	United States	Yakama	Peace treaty
Puget Sound War (1855–56); Part of the Yakima War	United States	Nisqually; Muckleshoot; Puyallup; Klickitat; Haida; Tlingit	Indians relocated to: Siletz Reservation; Grand Ronde Reservation; Coast Indian Reservation
Klamath and Salmon River War (1855)			
Tintic War (1856); Part of the Ute Wars			
Tule River War (1856)	United States; California	Yokuts	
Coeur d'Alene War (1858); Part of the Yakima War			
Mendocino War (1858); Part of the Yakima War		Yuki	
Fraser Canyon War (1858)	(British Empire) United Kingdom: (British Empire) Colony of British Columbia	Nlaka'pamux	
Bald Hills War (1858–64)	United States; California	"Wintoons": Whilkut; "Redwoods": Chilula; Hupa; "Mountain tribes": Chimariko; Lassik; Mattole; Nongatl; Sinkyone; Tsnungwe; Wailaki	
Mohave War (1858–59)	United States Maricopa	Mohave; Hualapai	
Paiute War (1860)	United States	Paiute; Shoshone; Bannock	
Yavapai Wars (1861–75)	United States	Yavapai; Apache; Yuma; Mohave	
Owens Valley Indian War (1862–67)	United States	Owens Valley Paiute; Shoshone; Kawaiisu; Tübatulabal	
Dakota War of 1862 (1862); Part of the Sioux Wars	United States	Dakota Sioux	
Goshute War (1863)			
Colorado War (1864–65); Part of the Sioux Wars	United States	Cheyenne; Arapaho	Military and congressional hearings against John Chivington
Snake War (1864–68)	United States	Snake Indians	
Hualapai War (1865–70); Part of the Yavapai Wars	United States	Hualapai; Yavapai; Havasupai	
Black Hawk's War (1865–72); Part of the Ute, Apache and Navajo Wars	United States	Hualapai; Yavapai; Havasupai	
Powder River War (1865); Part of the Sioux Wars	United States	Sioux; Cheyenne; Arapaho	
Red Cloud's War (1866–68); Part of the Sioux Wars	United States	Lakota; Cheyenne; Arapaho	Treaty of Fort Laramie (1868); Legal control of Powder River Country ceded to Native Americans; Creation of the Great Sioux Reservation (including the Black Hills)
Comanche campaign (1867–75); Part of the Texas–Indian Wars	United States	Cheyenne; Arapaho; Comanche; Kiowa	Medicine Lodge Treaty; Comanche surrender and relocation
Modoc War (1872–73)	United States	Modoc	
Red River War (1874–75)	United States	Cheyenne; Arapaho; Comanche; Kiowa	End of the Texas–Indian wars
Great Sioux War of 1876 (1876–77); Part of the Sioux Wars	United States; Canada	Lakota; Northern Cheyenne; Arapaho	Legal control of Powder River Country ceded to the United States
Pecos War (1876–77)		Apache	
Buffalo Hunters' War (1876–77); Part of the Apache and Texas–Indian Wars	United States	Comanche; Apache	
Nez Perce War (1877)	United States	Nez Perce	
Bannock War (1878)	United States	Bannock; Shoshone	
Cheyenne War (1878–79)	United States	Cheyenne	Northern Cheyenne Reservation created
Sheepeater Indian War (1879)	United States	Shoshone	
White River War (1879); Part of the Ute Wars	United States	Ute	
Victorio's War (1879–80); Part of the Apache Wars during Renegade period	United States; Mexico	Apache	
Geronimo's War (1881–86); Part of the Apache Wars	United States	Apache	
Crow War (1887)	United States	Crow	
Ghost Dance War (1890–91); Part of the Sioux Wars	United States	Sioux: Miniconjou; Hunkpapa	

== 20^{th} century wars ==
Conflict	Combatant 1	Combatant 2	Result
Crazy Snake Rebellion (1909)	United States	Creek	
New Mexico Navajo War (1913)			
Bluff War (1914–15); Part of the Navajo and Ute Wars	United States	Ute; Paiute	
Colorado Paiute War (1915)			
Posey War (1923); Part of the Ute Wars	United States	Ute; Paiute	

== See also ==
- List of historical Indian reservations in the United States
- List of Indian massacres
- List of traditional territories of the indigenous peoples of North America
- U.S.–Native American treaties
- Population history of indigenous peoples of the Americas
- Territorial evolution of the United States
- Territorial evolution of Canada
- Numbered Treaties
