= Battle of Ojo Caliente Canyon =

- Part of the Jicarilla War, Apache Wars, Ute Wars, American Indian Wars
Date	April 8, 1854
Location	near Ojo Caliente, New Mexico Territory
Result	United States victory

Belligerents
United States	Apache; Ute

Commanders and leaders
(United States) Philip St. George Cooke (United States) Kit Carson	Chacon

Strength
200 cavalry 100 infantry 32 native scouts	~150 warriors

Casualties and losses
None	5 killed 6 wounded,

This engagement should not be confused with the 1879 Battle of Ojo Caliente between Victorio's band and the 9th Cavalry.

The Battle of Ojo Caliente Canyon, or simply the Battle of Ojo Caliente was an engagement of the Jicarilla War on April 8, 1854. Combatants were Jicarilla Apache warriors, and their Ute allies, against the United States Army. The skirmish was fought as result of the pursuit of the Jicarilla after the Battle of Cieneguilla just over a week earlier.

== See also ==
- Navajo Wars
- Apache Scouts

== Bibliography ==
- Gorenfeld, Will, The Battle of Cieneguilla, Wild West magazine, Feb., 2008
- Bennett, James A., Forts & Forays: A dragoon in New Mexico, 1850–1856, University of New Mexico Press, Albuquerque, 1996, p 53
