= Francisco Chacon (Jicarilla chief) =

Jicarilla Apache leader

Chief

Military service
- Battles/wars: Cieneguilla, Ojo Caliente, Fisher's Peak

Francisco Chacon was a Jicarilla Apache chief, leader in the Jicarilla uprising of 1854. He led the band that defeated the Davidson detachment of the First Regiment of Dragoons in the Battle of Cieneguilla: the Jicarilla, led by Francisco Chacon, their principal chief, and Flechas Rayadas, fought with flintlock rifles and arrows, killing 22 and a wounding another 36 of 60 dragoon soldiers, who then retreated to Ranchos de Taos lighter by 22 horses and most of the troops' supplies.

Lieutenant Colonel Philip St. George Cooke of the 2nd Dragoons Regiment immediately pursued the Jicarilla, with the help of 32 Pueblo Indian and Mexican scouts under Captain James H. Quinn, with Kit Carson as the principal guide. After a winter pursuit through the mountains, Cooke caught up with the Jicarilla, whose leader, Flechas Rayadas offered an agreement for peace in exchange for the horses and guns the Jicarilla acquired from the battle, but the arrangement was not accepted. On April 8, Cooke Chief fought tribal members at their camp in the canyon of Ojo Caliente. Dispersing in small bands, the Jicarilla evaded further pursuit, but many died from the harsh cold weather.

A large unit under Maj. James H. Carleton fought again the Jicarillas near Fisher's Peak, in the Raton Mountains, killing several Jicarillas, and Francisco Chacon replied by trying an ambush against the soldiers with 150 warriors, but the Jicarillas were bypassed: five warriors were killed and six wounded, and seventeen among women and children were scattered and probably died of cold and hunger during the flight. In May, Francisco Chacon sent word to Santa Fe for peace and surrendered at Abiquiu.
