= Wagon Mound massacre =

Indian attack on civilians in 1850

- Part of the Apache Wars and Jicarilla War
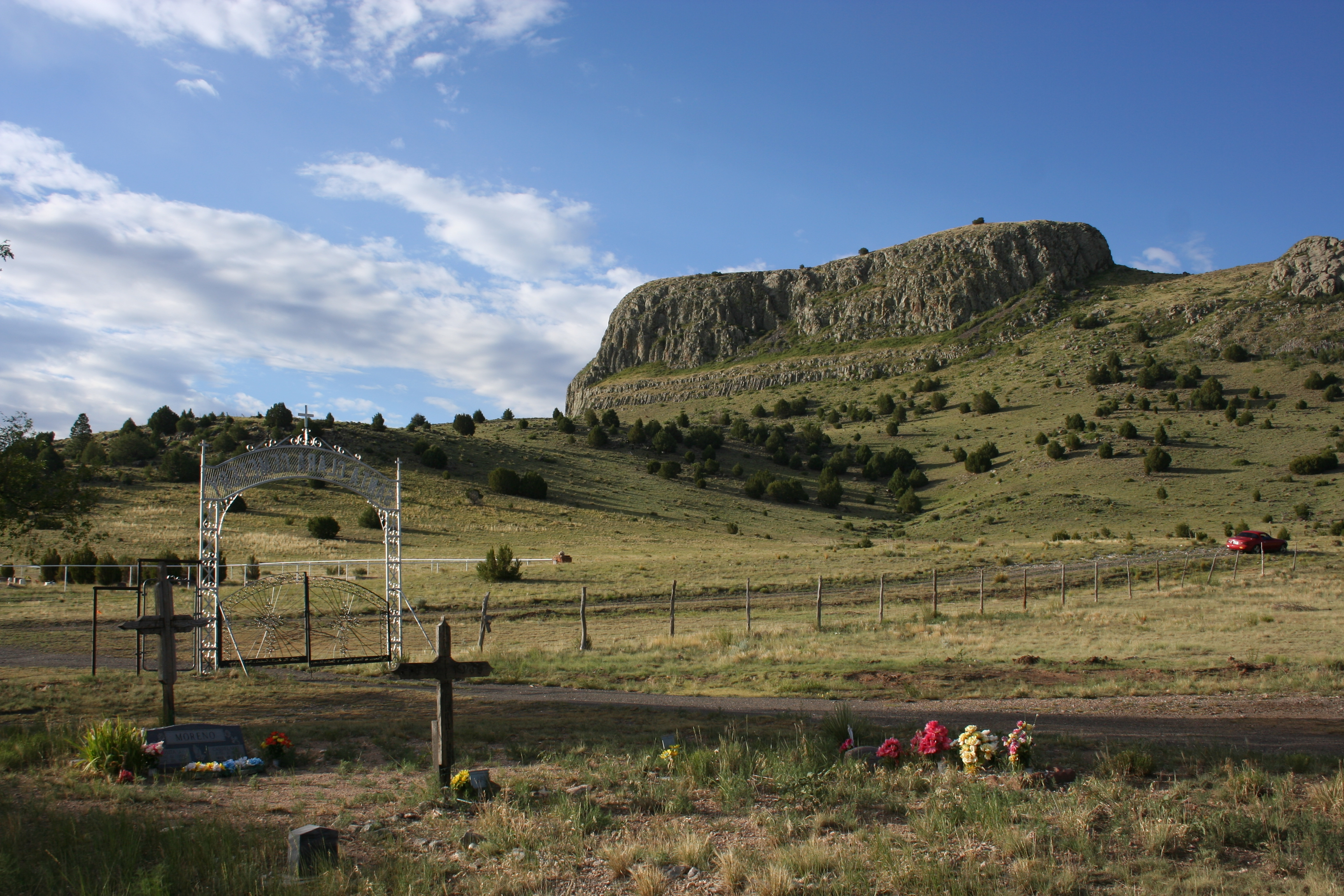
- The Wagon Mound butte, located in New Mexico.
- Location: Wagon Mound, New Mexico Territory
- Date: May 7, 1850
- Target: A wagon carrying mail on the Santa Fe Trail.
- Deaths: 10 American mail carriers and 9 Natives killed
- Perpetrators: 100 Apache and Ute warriors led by White Wolf

The Wagon Mound massacre was an attack on a US Postal Service ox-wagon carried out on May 7, 1850 by a band of Jicarilla Apache and Mouache Ute Indians on the Cimmaron Cutoff route of the Santa Fe Trail, near Wagon Mound, New Mexico. The bodies of the 10 Americans killed in the attack were found nearly two weeks after the attack, on May 19, 1850, by a US Cavalry patrol originating from Las Vegas, New Mexico. The patrol discovered the arrow-pierced bodies of the 10 victims while passing by the area, the bodies being discovered not at Wagon Mound, but nearby at Santa Clara Springs.

== Background ==
The events leading up to the massacre began nearly a year earlier, in August of 1849. An armed conflict occurred between a group of American soldiers and Jicarilla Apache warriors in an area about ten miles south of Las Vegas, New Mexico. Fourteen Indians were killed by sabre wounds sustained whilst fighting the American soldiers, and 6 Indian prisoners were taken by the Americans after the engagement. Of these prisoners, was the daughter of the powerful Jicarilla Apache chief Lobo Blanco, also known as White Wolf.

A troop of 20 men, led by Sgt. Henry Swartwont, left Las Vegas after the fight, keeping White Wolf's daughter hostage for use as a guide. A few days into the expedition, the soldiers reached Wagon Mound and set up camp. According to the account of another prisoner, a Jicarilla chief named Chief Chacon, a few men escorted White Wolf's daughter to the top of the mound, so that she could point out the areas at which the rest of the Apaches were located.

It was here, according to the account of Chief Chacon, that she managed to steal a knife from one of the soldiers, and after fighting with the men and trying to stab them, one of these soldiers fired shots, killing her. There are a few different accounts of the event, but they all end in the same result.

After hearing about the death of his daughter, White Wolf was angered and vowed to take revenge against the Americans. This began a series of attacks on Americans in the region carried out by him and other tribal warriors and chiefs, attempting to resist the Americans further encroachment on their lands. The Wagon Mound massacre was one of these events.

== The Massacre ==
A mail party of 10 Americans were traveling westbound on the Cimmaron Cutoff of the Santa Fe Trail when they were attacked by a small group of Jicarilla Indians, about 20 miles away from Wagon Mound, on May 6, 1850. Throughout the day, a running fight occurred, in which the mail carriers fled their pursuers.

The mail party stopped near Wagon Mound to sleep and hide during the night. While they were camped there, the group of Jicarilla Indians joined up with a party of Ute Indians. This new group of warriors, numbering about 100, caught up with the mail carriers the next day, and, on May 7, after overwhelming the Americans, carried out the attack, in which they cornered and killed all of the 10 Americans with arrows.

In the end, the Indians had lost 9 men, who were killed by the defensive fire from the mail party, and all of the Americans were killed.

== After the Massacre ==
When the Las Vegas cavalry patrol discovered the bodies of the mail carriers at Santa Clara Springs, they returned immediately to Barclay's Fort in Las Vegas, and informed Major E.B. Alexander (Third Infantry), of the incident. The cavalry patrol refused to continue on their planned route and stated they would only continue if they were given more men as escorts and as a safety measure.

Men were soon sent from Las Vegas to the site of the attack to investigate the killings, bury the bodies, and recover the lost mail. Laborers dug a mass grave for the victims, who were described as having been "very much eaten by the wolves" in the weeks before their discovery. The mail wagon was burned on top of the shallow grave, to further bury the bodies and ensure the graves were not further disturbed by wild animals.

The short investigation concluded that a group of about 100 Indians had carried out the attack, and the arrows in the victims were identified as Ute and Jicarilla Apache. The attack was described by some men as "the most daring murder ever committed by the Indians".

After the attack, the US military improved their presence in the area, stationing more troops across the region to protect from more attacks.
