= Fort Plymouth =

Extinct hamlet in Kansas, U.S.

- Brown County, Kansas

Site information
- Type: free-stater post during Bleeding Kansas era
- Controlled by: free-staters

Location
- Coordinates: 39.9586°N 95.7151°W

Site history
- Built: summer to October 1856 (never completed)
- In use: summer to October 1856
- Materials: wood, soil, adobe

Garrison information
- Past commanders: possibly James H. Lane
- Garrison: free-state settlers

The construction of Fort Plymouth began in summer 1856. The site was settled by a group of free-state partisans who entered Brown County from Nebraska Territory. This site was also meant to become a free-state town, but possibly only one house was constructed on the site. The fort, named after Plymouth Rock by surveyors from Massachusetts, was located on or near the top of a high hill north of Pony Creek. Fort Plymouth was 3 miles (4.8 km) south of the Nebraska border.

A redoubt was built by free-state leader James H. Lane and about fifteen men. This redoubt was mostly underground and had dirt and adobe walls about six feet above ground. These walls had a number of port holes and rifle pits were dug inside or near the redoubt. By October the free-staters had begun constructing a house inside their fort. The construction was halted when Lieut. Col. Philip St. George Cooke arrived with dragoons and camped near Fort Plymouth. Cooke desired to prevent violence from erupting between those favoring the northern and southern causes. The dragoons and a federal deputy marshal confiscated a number of weapons from the fort. Cooke had his men destroy Fort Plymouth. The site was basically abandoned, but the remains of the fort could be seen as late as 1883.
