= KCIE =

KCIE may refer to:

- Knight Commander, one of the ranks of the Order of the Indian Empire
- KCIE (FM), a radio station (90.5 FM) licensed to Dulce, New Mexico, United States
