= Lobo Blanco =

Jicarilla Apache chief

Jicarilla Apache leader

Chief

Military service
- Battles/wars: Fort Union / Canadian River

Lobo Blanco or White Wolf was a Jicarilla Apache chief of the band that, with 30 warriors, raided the horse herd of the Second Regiment of Dragoons at Fort Union, and, reached up near the Canadian River, was defeated by Lieutenant Bell's Dragoon detachment in the Battle of Canadian River on April 4, 1854, before the Battle of Cieneguilla; repeatedly wounded, the chief was finally killed crushing him under a boulder.

White Wolf also carried out various attacks in the New Mexico Territory during the Apache Wars, including the Wagon Mound massacre.
