= Viola Cordova =

Philosopher, artist, and author

Viola Cordova (October 20, 1937 – November 2, 2002) was a philosopher, artist, author, and member of the Jicarilla Apache tribe. She was one of the first Native American women to earn a PhD in philosophy.

== Early life ==
Viola Cordova grew up in Taos, New Mexico; her father was a member of the Jicarilla Apache tribe, and her mother was Hispanic. She earned her bachelor's degree from Idaho State University, and her MA and PhD in philosophy from the University of New Mexico.

== Career ==
She served with Anne Waters as co-editor of the American Philosophical Association's Newsletter on American Indians in Philosophy from its inception in 2001 until her death.

In his book, What Has No Place, Remains, Nicholas Shrubsole notes that "Viola Cordova reminds us that the act of listening to understand cannot be premised upon the desire to see a distortion of one’s self."

== Death and legacy ==
Cordova died on November 2, 2002. After her death, the University of New Mexico named an annual lecture series in her honor.

== Works ==
- Conceptual frameworks as a source of cultural distinctions (Master's thesis, University of New Mexico, 1985)
- The concept of monism in Navajo thought (PhD dissertation, University of New Mexico, 1992)
- How It Is: A Native American Creation Story by V. F. Cordova (Center for Applied Studies in American Ethnicity, Colorado State University, 1994)
- Who We Are: An Exploration of Identity by V. F. Cordova (Center for Applied Studies in American Ethnicity, Colorado State University, 1994)
- Hearing Other Voices: A Series of Talks and Lectures by Viola Cordova, PhD (Colorado State University, 1995)
- Cordova, V. F. (2007). How It Is: The Native American Philosophy of V. F. Cordova. Edited by Kathleen Dean Moore, Kurt Peters, Ted Jojola, and Amber Lacy. Tucson: University of Arizona Press. ISBN 978-0-8165-2649-9. OCLC 137331382.
