= Tammie Allen =

Native American potter

- Born: 1964 (age 61–62); Blanco, New Mexico, U.S.
- Citizenship: Jicarilla Apache Nation, United States
- Known for: Pottery
- Movement: Jicarilla Apache pottery

Tammie Allen (born 1964) is a contemporary Native American potter, enrolled in the Jicarilla Apache Nation.

== Early life and education ==
Born in Blanco, New Mexico, Tammy Allen belongs to the Jicarilla Apache tribe, specifically, the Ollero Clan (Mountain People). She is a direct descendant of Jicarilla Apache chiefs and Chief Ouray of the Ute Tribe, who was instrumental in helping establish the Jicarilla Apache reservation.

Allen attended Coronado High School in Gallina, New Mexico. She earned a Bachelor of Humanities degree in 2000 from the College of Santa Fe, in Santa Fe, New Mexico, graduating with honors.

Allen is a non-lineage micaceous pottery artist, that is, she does not come from a long line of Jicarilla Apache potters. Nonetheless, she is interested in sustaining this tradition for the next generation of Jicarilla Apaches.

== Art career ==
Although she had already been working in ceramics, in 1995, Allen began experimenting with micaceous clay. Micaceous pottery has a glittery surface, due to the presence of mica flakes in the clay. She wanted to keep the Jicarilla Apache pottery tradition alive by using historical Native American pottery construction techniques.

She exhibited her new work in Native American art galleries and museums. The pottery she presented did not resemble typical micaceous cooking pots. The Jicarilla Apache author Veronica E. Tiller wrote that Allen makes "thin, balanced, highly polished, engaging shapes of pottery using strong lines to help her convey her philosophy that life is continual, with a series of positive and negative events."

Allen sold her first pieces to the Cottonwood Trading Post, in San Ildefonso Pueblo, New Mexico, the Denver Museum of Natural History, Denver, Colorado, and Wheelwright Museum of the American Indian. This introduction has paved way for other Jicarilla Apache potters, since there were very few practicing ceramics at the time.

In 2005, Allen was accepted and entered her first Santa Fe Indian Market. During this show, she won first and third place prizes in her division. Currently, she is represented by several galleries and conducts demonstrations and workshops about pottery making.
