= KCIE (FM) =

Dulce, New Mexico; United States
- Frequency: 90.5 MHz

Programming
- Format: Variety

Ownership
- Owner: Jicarilla Apache Nation

History
- First air date: December 3, 1991
- Former call signs: KJAT (1987–1990)

Technical information
- Licensing authority: FCC
- Facility ID: 31128
- Class: A
- ERP: 100 watts
- HAAT: 468.0 meters
- Transmitter coordinates: 36°59′0″N 106°58′12″W

Links
- Public license information: Public file; LMS
- Webcast: Listen Live
- Website: KCIE website

KCIE (90.5 FM) is a radio station broadcasting a Variety format. Licensed to Dulce, New Mexico, United States, the station is currently owned by the Jicarilla Apache Nation.

== History ==
The station was assigned the call sign KJAT on September 14, 1987. On September 21, 1990, the station changed its call sign to KCIE. The station itself would not sign on until December 3, 1991.
