= Pilar, New Mexico =

Unincorporated community in New Mexico, US

Coordinates: 36°16′11″N 105°47′15″W

Pilar, seen from a nearby mountain. To the right is the Rio Grande; at the top of the "T" is the highway that connects Taos and Santa Fe.

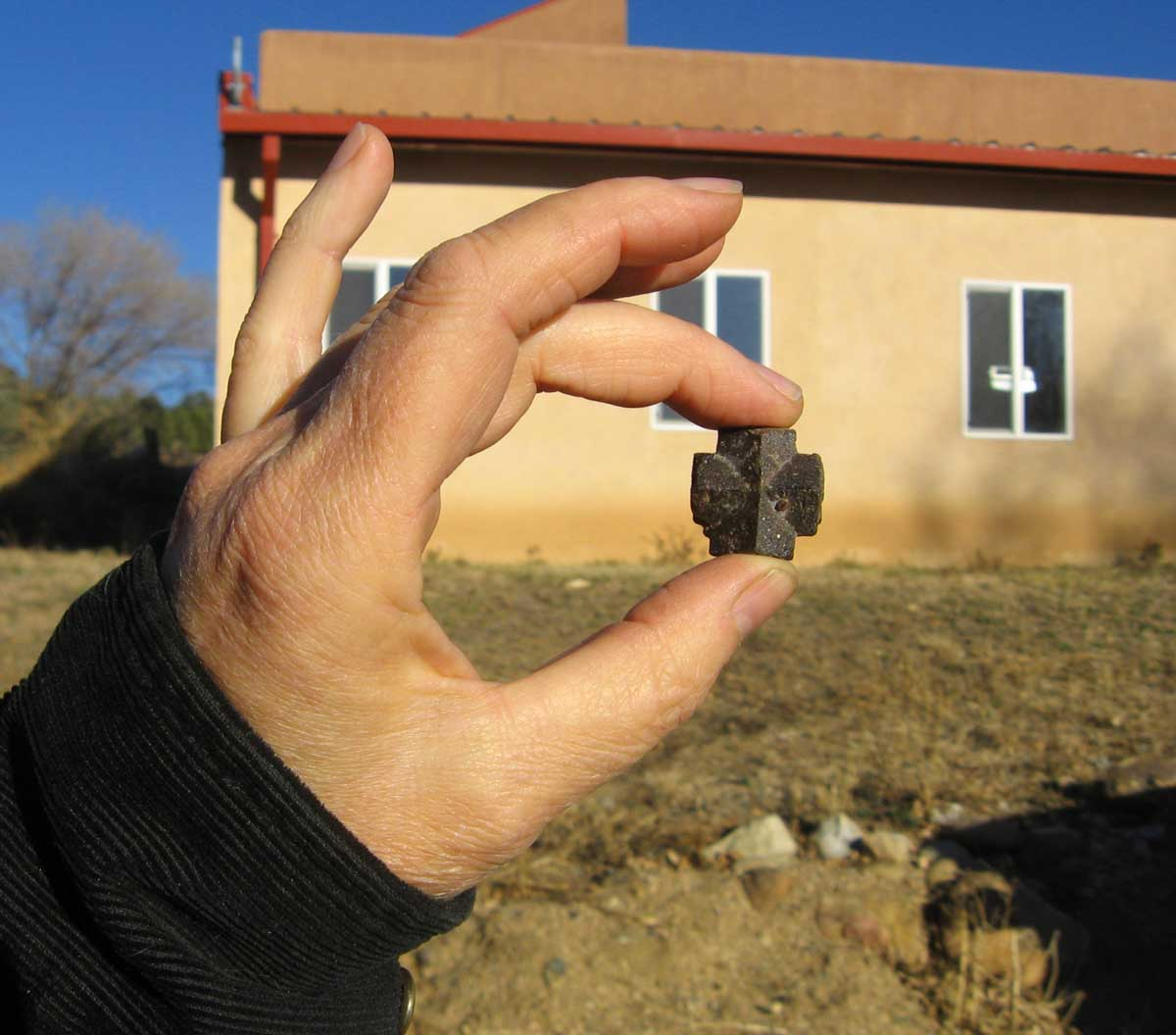
Staurolite cross found nearby

Pilar (formerly Cieneguilla) is an unincorporated community in Taos County, New Mexico, United States. It is located on the Rio Grande.

== Etymology ==
The original name of Cieneguilla is derived from the Spanish word ciénaga, which means "marsh" or "marshy place". The swampy ground is caused by several streams running across a small flood plain formed by a bend in the Rio Grande. Because the area featured a flat plain with a constant source of water, it was long frequented by the Jicarilla Apache. The village's modern name of Pilar was adopted after its post office was incorporated in 1918. One story suggests that the name came from the daughter of the office's first postmaster, who was named for the Nuestra Señora del Pilar apparition of the Virgin Mary, which appeared on an old Roman pillar in Zaragoza, Spain. Another more commonly cited story suggests that the name was given to the post office in honor of an influential Native American (Hispanic-Ute) male who lived in the area by the name of José Pilar Vigil.

== History ==
In 1694, the Spaniard Diego de Vargas burned the Apache village in the process of his re-conquest of New Mexico following the expulsion of the Spanish during the Pueblo Revolt of 1680.

In February 1793 the region was taken possession of by 20 persons who had received it as a land grant (Cieneguilla Grant) from the King of Spain Charles IV through his military governor in New Mexico, Don Fernando Chacón.

On March 30, 1854, the Battle of Cieneguilla between the Jicarilla Apache fighters and the U.S. 1st Cavalry Regiment was fought in the hills several miles from the town.
