= John Wynn Davidson =

United States Army general (1825–1881)

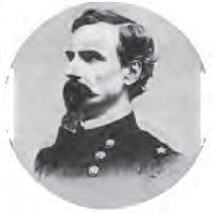
- John W. Davidson
- Born: August 14, 1825; Fairfax County, Virginia, U.S.
- Died: June 26, 1881 (aged 55); Saint Paul, Minnesota, U.S.
- Burial place: Arlington National Cemetery
- Military career
- Allegiance: United States of America; Union
- Branch: United States Army; Union Army
- Service years: 1845–1881
- Rank: Brigadier General; Brevet Major General
- Nickname: "Black Jack"
- Units: 1st Cavalry Regiment; 10th Cavalry Regiment; 2nd Cavalry Regiment
- Conflicts: Mexican–American War; Battle of San Pasqual; Battle of Rio San Gabriel; American Indian Wars; Apache Wars; Battle of Cieneguilla; American Civil War; Seven Days Battles; Battle of Bayou Fourche

John Wynn Davidson (August 14, 1825 – June 26, 1881) was a brigadier general in the United States Army during the American Civil War and an American Indian fighter. In 1850, he co-led the Bloody Island massacre of 60-200 Pomo old men, women, and children as part of the wider California genocide.

In 1866, he received brevet grade appointments as a major general of volunteers and in the regular U.S. Army for his Civil War service.

== Early life and education ==
Davidson was born in Fairfax County, Virginia, the son of William B. Davidson, an artillery officer in the United States Army, and the former Elizabeth Chapman Hunter. He was the oldest of four boys, including Hunter, Roger, and Charles. In 1840, his father died from disease in Florida during the Second Seminole War. His mother died ten years later, shortly after remarrying.

He graduated from the United States Military Academy at West Point, New York, in 1845. His father graduated from there in 1815.

== Career ==
=== Mexican-American War ===
Shortly after graduation he was promoted to 2nd Lieutenant in the 1st U.S. Dragoons and participated in the Mexican–American War, and was engaged in considerable military action at the Battle of San Pasqual and the Battle of Rio San Gabriel. On May 15, 1850, Davidson and Captain Nathaniel Lyon led a regiment of the 1st U.S. Dragoons in a massacre of the Pomo population of the island of Bo-No-Po-Ti in northern California.

=== Western Indian Wars ===
Following the Mexican-American War, Davidson was promoted to 1st Lieutenant and assigned to the Western frontier, where he served as the regimental quartermaster and adjutant. He led two companies of the 1st Dragoon Regiment against the Jicarilla Apaches in the Battle of Cieneguilla on March 30, 1854, where he was badly defeated in the fourth-worst defeat suffered by the American military during the Western Indian Wars. In 1855 Davidson, who had still earned praise for commanding at Cieneguilla, was promoted captain and was in command of Fort Tejon, California when the American Civil War erupted.

In 1851, he married Clara McGunnegle, the daughter of a merchant in St. Louis, and they had several children.

=== American Civil War ===
He was allegedly offered a commission in the Confederate Army, but turned it down. Davidson was transferred to the east and took command of a brigade in the newly formed Army of the Potomac. On February 6, 1862, President Abraham Lincoln appointed Davidson to the grade of brigadier general of U.S. volunteers, to rank from February 3, 1862, the same day the U.S. Senate confirmed the previously submitted nomination.

General Davidson assumed command of the 3rd Brigade, 2nd Division, IV Corps during the Peninsula Campaign. He fought at the battles of Yorktown and Williamsburg. During the Seven Days Battles he received brevet promotions in the Regular Army for his service at Gaines' Mill and Golding's Farm. Shortly after the culmination of the Seven Days' fighting, Davidson was transferred to the Trans-Mississippi Theater where he was placed in command of the Dist. of St. Louis. From December 3, 1862, to March 26, 1863, he was also in command of the so-called Army of Southeast Missouri until much of his army was transferred to Ulysses S. Grant in preparation for the Vicksburg Campaign. He retained command of the Dist. of St. Louis until June 16, 1863, when he briefly commanded the Dist. of Southeast Missouri.

From August 10 to November 3, 1863, Davidson commanded the 1st Division of Frederick Steele's Army of Arkansas in his most distinguished role in the west. He led Union advance into central Arkansas and won the Battle of Bayou Fourche, which led directly to the fall of Confederate-held Little Rock. After the Little Rock expedition, Davidson commanded the cavalry in the Dept. of the Gulf before returning to command the cavalry in the Dist. of Southeast Missouri.

==== Davidson's raid ====
Beginning November 27, 1864, Davidson was ordered to lead a 4,000 strong cavalry raid from the Union Army held Baton Rouge, to sever the M & O Railroad near State Line, Mississippi. The raid was intended to divert resources away from Confederate John Bell Hood's operations near Nashville, and to threaten and harass Mobile. Additionally, the raid was to support Sherman's March to the Sea by requiring the Confederates to keep resources in the Mobile theater of operations. After departing Baton Rouge Davidson's forces reached Greensburg capturing several Confederate prisoners, on November 29, 1864, then to Tangipahoa where they captured a confederate conscript camp and destroyed the New Orleans, Jackson Great Northern Railroad.

On December 3, 1864, Davidson's Raiders crossed the Pearl River and entered Marion County, Mississippi, occupying Columbia the next day. While in Columbia the cavalry foraged extensively in the area. General Davidson then ordered a diversionary feint toward's Monticello, Mississippi led by Major Seth Remington. After engaging in a brief skirmish outside Columbia Davidson's forces headed east towards Augusta. Upon Davidson's arrival receipt of certain intelligence made him alter his plans. An excerpt from Davidson's official report provides: "The day after my arrival at Augusta I found Mobile papers containing full accounts of our strength and design and our daily progress and marches were telegraphed to Meridian Where Gen. R. Taylor had his headquarters, and to Mobile." As a result, Davidson decided to divide his command, sending a small element of the 2nd New York Veteran Cavalry, 1st Louisiana Cavalry, and a detachment of the 11th New York Cavalry under the command of Lt. Col. Asa Gurney north via Leakesville to destroy telegraph lines and a bridge on the Mobile and Ohio at State Line near the Alabama line, while he continued on toward Farley's Ferry.

On December 10, 1864, elements of Davidson's forces met two regiments of Confederate Cavalry near Leakesville, Mississippi at McLeod's Mill. During the ensuring Battle of McLeod's Mill, one Union soldier stated the lead flew faster than he had ever seen before. The Confederates kept falling back to their main body. Finally, Lieutenant Albert Westinghouse, in command of the first squadron, was ordered to draw sabre and make a charge, which took them past the mill. Westinghouse in the vanguard spurred his horse and shouted to his men to "follow me", all the while swinging his sabre overhead. Westinghouse was shot in the stomach while making the charge and died shortly thereafter. Three charges were made against the Confederates after they had fallen back on their main body. The Union detachment soon realized they were now facing superior numbers with the advantage interior lines of communication, and therefore abandoned the mission. After withdrawing from the engagement, the Confederates did not follow in pursuit. When the fight concluded, three soldiers from the 2nd New York were killed, including Company B's 1st Lt. Albert Westinghouse along with Sgt. Theodore Moss and James Woods of Company A. After this struggle, two days later, Gurney rejoined Davidson's main column. According to different accounts around fourteen or fifteen Confederates were killed along with several being taken prisoner by the withdrawing column.

For the remainder of the Civil War, Davidson held various administrative commands in Mississippi. He was mustered out of the volunteer service on January 15, 1866.

On January 13, 1866, President Andrew Johnson nominated Davidson for appointment to the grade of brevet major general of volunteers to rank from March 13, 1865, and the United States Senate confirmed the appointment on March 12, 1866. On April 10, 1866, President Johnson nominated Davidson for appointment to the grade of brevet brigadier general, U.S. Army, to rank from March 13, 1865, and the U.S. Senate confirmed that appointment on May 4, 1866. On July 17, 1866, President Johnson nominated Davidson for appointment to the grade of brevet major general, U.S. Army, to rank from March 13, 1865, and the U.S. Senate confirmed the appointment on July 23, 1866.

== Post-war service ==
Following the end of the Civil War, Davidson was again posted on the Western frontier, this time as a lieutenant colonel of the 10th Cavalry, known as the Buffalo Soldiers. It was there that he acquired the nickname "Black Jack." Davidson also served as the first professor of military science (1868–1871) at Kansas State Agricultural College.

In 1879 he was transferred to the 2nd Cavalry as colonel, at Fort Custer in the Montana Territory. Davidson died in Saint Paul, Minnesota, in 1881 . Originally buried in Bellefontaine Cemetery in St. Louis, his body was exhumed in 1911 for reburial in Arlington National Cemetery. His widow died in 1914 and is interred beside him.

== See also ==
- List of American Civil War generals (Union)
- Notable graduates of West Point
