= Apache Wars =

Conflicts between the U.S. Army and native Apache tribes (1849–1924)

- Part of the American Indian Wars
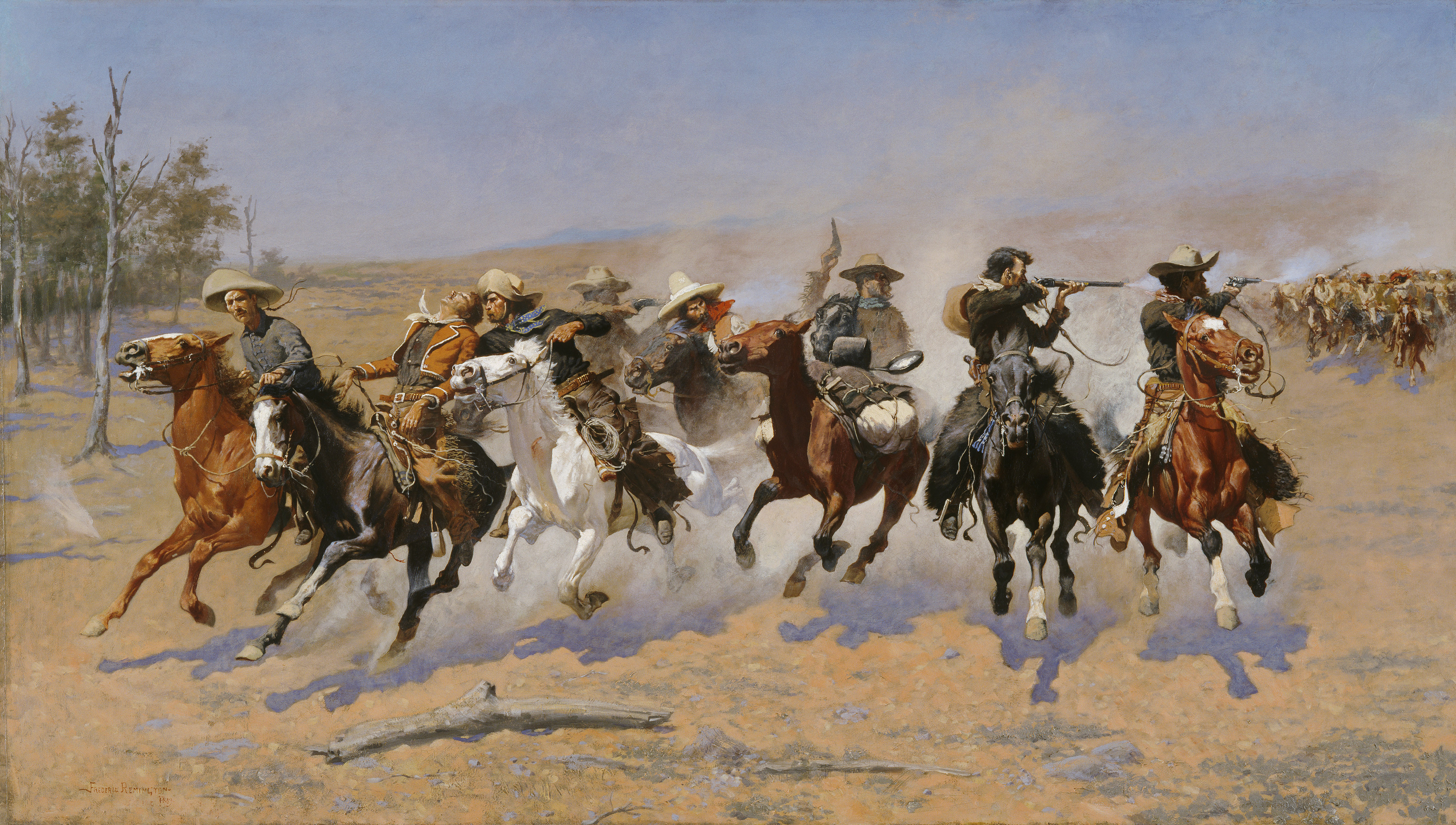
- A Dash for the Timber; Frederic Remington, 1889
Date	1849–1924
Location	Southwestern United States
Result	United States victory

Belligerents
United States Confederate States (1861–1865)	Apacheria: Chiricahua Apache; Jicarilla Apache; Mescalero Apache; Lipan Apache; Western Apache; Plains Apache; Apache allies: Ute; Yavapai; Navajo; Yuma; Mohave

Commanders and leaders
(United States) John Davidson (United States) James H. Carleton (United States) Kit Carson (United States) Philip Cooke (United States) John G. Walker (United States) George Crook (United States) George Jordan (United States) Eugene Asa Carr (United States) Philip Sheridan (United States) Nelson A. Miles (United States) Alfred Gibbs (United States) Henry Lawton (United States) James W. Watson (Confederate States of America) Sherod Hunter (Confederate States of America) Granville H. Oury (Confederate States of America) Thomas J. Mastin † (Confederate States of America) Jack Swilling (Confederate States of America) James H. Tevis	Flechas Rayada; Chacon; Black Knife †; Mangas Coloradas †; Iron Shirt †; Cochise; Francisco; Juh; Delshay; Victorio †; Nanni Chaddi †; Na tio tish †; Geronimo; Chatto; Apache Kid; Massai; Little Wolf (Mescalero); Te-He-Nan †; Nana # Saguaro; Coronado †; Santos; Red Dog; Lobo Blanco †

The Apache Wars were a series of armed conflicts between the United States Army and various Apache tribal confederations fought in the southwest between 1849 and 1886, though minor hostilities continued until as late as 1924. After the Mexican–American War in 1846, the United States annexed conflicted territory from Mexico which was the home of both settlers and Apache tribes. Conflicts continued as American settlers came into traditional Apache lands to raise livestock and crops and to mine minerals.

The U.S. Army established forts to fight Apache tribal war parties and force Apaches to move to designated Indian reservations created by the U.S. in accordance with the Indian Removal Act. Some reservations were not on the traditional areas occupied by the Apache. In 1886, the U.S. Army put over 5,000 soldiers in the field to fight, which resulted in the surrender of Geronimo and 30 of his followers. This is generally considered the end of the Apache Wars, although conflicts continued between citizens and Apaches. The Confederate Army briefly participated in the wars during the early 1860s in Texas, before being diverted to action in the American Civil War in New Mexico and Arizona.

== Background ==
Historically, the Apache had raided enemy tribes and sometimes each other, for livestock, food or captives. They raided with small parties, for a specific purpose. The Apache only rarely united to gather armies of hundreds of men, using all tribal male members of warrior age.

The first U.S. Army campaigns specifically against the Apache began in 1849.

== Conflicts ==
=== Jicarilla War ===
At the start of the Mexican–American War in 1846, many Apache tribal chieftains promised American soldiers safe passage through their land, though other tribes fought in defense of Mexico and against the influx of new settlers to New Mexico. When the United States claimed the frontier territories of Mexico in 1848, Mangas Coloradas signed a peace treaty, respecting the Americans as the conquerors of the Mexicans' land.

However, as Tiller relates regarding the treaty signed at Santa Fe on April 2, 1851, "The Jicarillas were expected to comply with the terms of the treaty immediately, yet as far as the new Mexicans were concerned, their part of the bargain would go into effect only after Congress had ratified it." The United States Congress never did ratify the treaty. An uneasy peace between the Apache and the Americans persisted until an influx of gold miners into the Santa Rita Mountains of present-day Arizona led to conflict.

The Jicarilla War began in 1849 when a group of settlers were attacked and killed by a force of Jicarillas and Utes in northeastern New Mexico. A second massacre occurred in 1850, in which several mail carriers were killed. The U.S. Army became involved in 1853. The Army went on to fight at the Battle of Cieneguilla, a significant Apache victory, and later the Battle of Ojo Caliente Canyon, an American victory.

=== Chiricahua wars ===
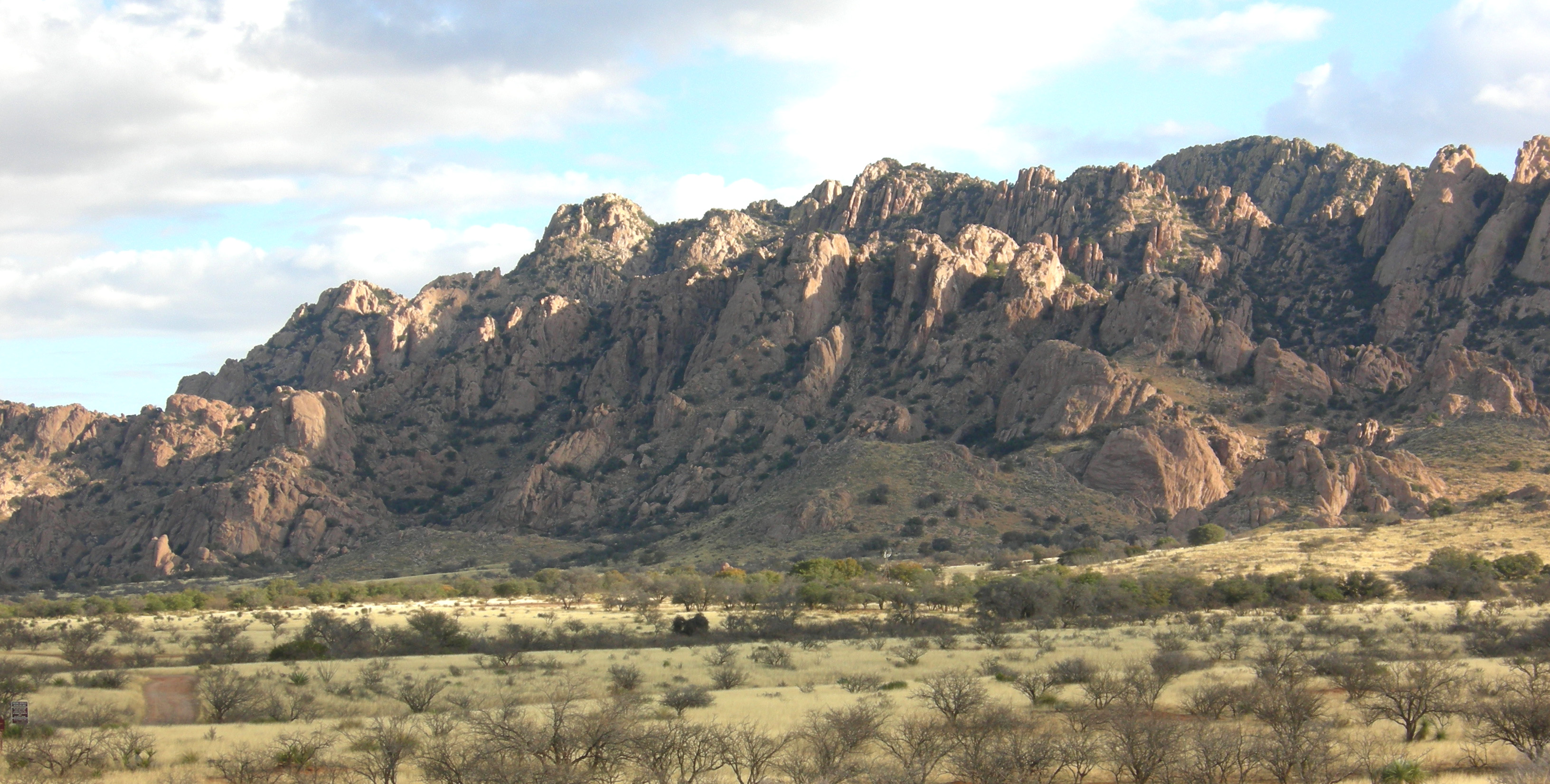
The Dragoon Mountains, where Cochise hid with his warriors.

In 1851, near the Pinos Altos mining camp, Mangas Coloradas was attacked by a group of miners; they tied him to a tree and severely beat him. Similar incidents continued in violation of the treaty, leading to Apache reprisals against European Americans. In December 1860, thirty miners launched a surprise attack on an encampment of Bedonkohe on the west bank of the Mimbres River in retaliation for the theft of numerous livestock. According to the historian Edwin R. Sweeney, the miners "... killed four Indians, wounded others, and captured thirteen women and children." The Apache quickly retaliated with raids against U.S. citizens and property.

In early February 1861, a group of Coyotero Apaches stole cattle and kidnapped the stepson of the rancher John Ward near Sonoita, Arizona. Ward sought redress from the nearby American Army. Lieutenant George N. Bascom was dispatched, and Ward accompanied the detail. Bascom set out to meet with Cochise near Apache Pass and the Butterfield Overland Stagecoach station to secure the cattle and Ward's son. Cochise was unaware of the incident, but he offered to seek those responsible. Dissatisfied, Bascom accused Cochise of having been involved. He took Cochise and his group of family members, including his wife and children, under arrest. Angered, Cochise slashed his way from the tent and escaped. After further failed negotiations, Cochise took a member of the stage coach station hostage after an exchange of gunfire.

With Bascom unwilling to exchange prisoners, Cochise and his party killed the members of a passing Mexican wagon train. The Apache killed and ritually scalped nine Mexicans and took three whites captive but killed them later. They were unsuccessful in attempting an ambush of a Butterfield Overland stagecoach. With negotiations between Cochise and Bascom at an impasse, Bascom sent for reinforcements. Cochise killed the remaining four captives from the Butterfield Station and abandoned negotiations. Upon the advice of military surgeon Bernard Irwin, Bascom hanged the Apache hostages in his custody. The retaliatory executions became known as the Bascom affair; they initiated another eleven years of open warfare between the varying groups of Apache and the United States settlers, the U.S. Army and the Confederate Army.

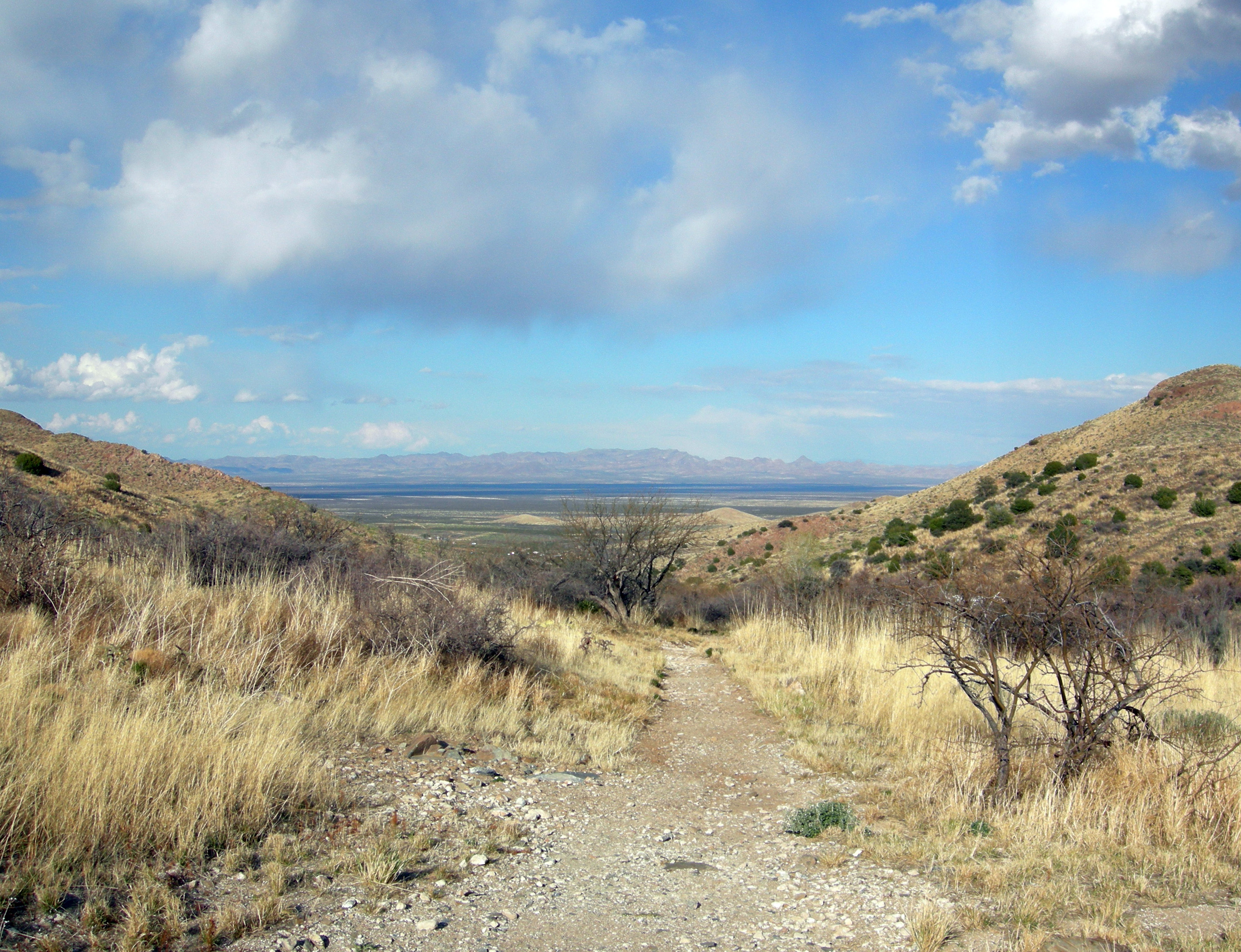
Apache Pass as viewed from Fort Bowie

After the American Civil War began in April 1861, Mangas Coloradas and Cochise, his son-in-law, struck an alliance, agreeing to drive all Americans and Mexicans out of Apache territory. Their campaigns against the Confederates were the battles of Tubac, Cookes Canyon, Florida Mountains, Pinos Altos and Dragoon Springs. Other Apache war parties fought the Rebels as well; Mescalero Apache attacked and captured a herd of livestock at Fort Davis on August 9, 1861, with the Apache killing two guards in the process. The Army sent out a patrol to try to retrieve the livestock, and the Apache killed them all in an ambush. Mangas Coloradas and Cochise were joined in their campaign by the chief Juh and the notable warrior Geronimo. They thought that they had achieved some success when the Americans closed the Butterfield Overland Stagecoach and Army troops departed, but those actions were related to the beginning of the Civil War.

The United States military leadership decided to move against the Arizona Confederates in what the Union considered part of the New Mexico Territory by dispatching a column of Californian volunteers under Colonel James Henry Carleton. The California Column, as it was known, followed the old Butterfield Overland Trail east. In 1862 the troops encountered Mangas Coloradas and Cochise's followers near the site of the spring in Apache Pass. In the Battle of Apache Pass, soldiers shot and wounded Mangas Coloradas in the chest. While recuperating, he met with an intermediary to call for surrender with the United States.

In January 1863, Coloradas agreed to surrender to U.S. military leaders at Fort McLane, near present-day Hurley in southwestern New Mexico. Coloradas arrived to surrender to Brigadier General Joseph Rodman West, an officer of the California militia. American soldiers took him into custody where he was murdered under the pretext of an escape attempt. On West's orders, Coloradas was stabbed with red-hot bayonets and shot. He was beheaded so that his skull could be sent to a phrenologist in New York City for study.

Men, that old murderer has got away from every soldier command and has left a trail of blood for 500 miles on the old stage line. I want him dead tomorrow morning. Do you understand? I want him dead.

The war dragged on for another 9 years as the Apaches fought harder to avenge Mangas Coloradas' memory.

Colonel Carleton then decided to move the Navajo and Apache to reservations. Initially, he intended to make the Rio Grande valley safer for settlement and end the raids on travelers. He began by moving various tribes of Mescalero and Navajo onto the reservation at Fort Sumner. He enlisted Kit Carson, one-time friend of the Navajo, to round them up by destroying their crops and livestock, and moving them on the Long Walk to Fort Sumner.

=== Texas Indian Wars ===
On November 25, 1864, the Plains Apache fought in one of the largest battles of the American Indian Wars at the First Battle of Adobe Walls. Carson led an army of 400 soldiers and Ute scouts to the Texas panhandle and captured an encampment from which the inhabitants had fled. More than 1,000 Comanche, Kiowa and Plains Apache attacked. Carson took a position in an abandoned adobe building on top of a hill and repulsed several attacks. After a day of fighting, Carson retreated and the Indians permitted him to leave without opposition. Iron Shirt, a Plains Apache chief, was killed in the battle. Six soldiers were killed; the army estimated that the Indians suffered 60 killed and wounded.

The last battle between the U.S Military and the Apaches in Texas were both the Battle of Rattlesnake Springs and the Battle of Quitman Canyon, both taking place in the summer of 1880. The last well recorded Apache raid into Texas was the McLaurin Massacre of 1881, although Apache raids in the state were believed to have happened until 1882.

=== Yavapai War ===
The Yavapai Wars, or the Tonto Wars, were a series of armed conflicts between the Yavapai and Tonto tribes against the U.S. in Arizona. The period began no later than 1861, with the arrival of American settlers on Yavapai and Tonto land. At the time, the Yavapai were considered a tribe of the Western Apache people because of their close relationship with tribes such as the Tonto and Pinal. The war culminated with the Yavapai's removal from the Camp Verde Reservation to San Carlos on February 27, 1875, an event now known as Exodus Day.

In 1871, a group of 6 white Americans, 48 Mexicans, and almost 100 Papago warriors attacked Camp Grant and massacred about 150 Apache men, women, and children. Campaigning against the Apache continued in the mid-1870s. The Skeleton Cave massacre and the Battle of Turret Peak are prime examples of the violence in the Arizona region. Soldiers and civilians, especially from Tucson, frequently pursued various Apache tribal war parties, trying to end their raids.

=== Victorio's War ===
In 1879, the veteran Chiricahua war chief Victorio and his followers were facing forced removal from their homeland and reservation at Ojo Caliente, New Mexico and transfer to San Carlos Apache Indian Reservation in Arizona. On August 21, 1879, Victorio, 80 warriors, and their women and children fled the reservation. Victorio was joined by other Apache, especially Mescalero, and his force may have reached a maximum of 200 warriors, an unusually large force of Apache.

For 14 months, Victorio led a guerrilla war against the U.S. Army and white settlers in southern New Mexico, western Texas, and northern Mexico. He fought more than a dozen battles and skirmishes with the U.S. Army and raided several civilian settlements. Several thousand American and Mexican soldiers and Indian scouts pursued him, as he fled from one stronghold to another. Victorio and many of his followers met their end on October 14, 1880, when they were surrounded and killed by Mexican soldiers at the Battle of Tres Castillos in Chihuahua, Mexico. A lieutenant of Victorio's, Nana, continued the war. With fewer than 40 warriors Nana raided extensively in New Mexico from June to August 1881. Nana survived the raid and died of old age in 1896.

=== Battles near Fort Apache ===
In August 1881, a force of soldiers from Fort Apache Indian Reservation was sent to investigate recent reports of Apache unrest and to detain the medicine man Nock-ay-det-klinne. The arrest of Nock-ay-det-klinne by three Native scouts was peaceful until they made their way back to camp. Upon arrival on August 31, the camp had already been surrounded by Nock-ay-det-klinne's followers. The Battle of Cibecue Creek began, and Nock-ay-det-klinne was killed. The following day, the Apache warriors attacked Fort Apache in reprisal for the death of Nock-ay-det-klinne.

In the spring of 1882, the warrior Na-tio-tisha led a party of about 60 White Mountain Apache warriors. In early July they ambushed and killed four San Carlos policemen, including the police chief. After the ambush, Na-tio-tisha led his war-party northwest through the Tonto Basin. Local Arizona settlers were greatly alarmed and demanded protection from the U.S. Army. It sent out fourteen companies of U.S. Cavalry from forts across the region. In the middle of July, Na-tio-tisha led his war-party up Cherry Creek to the Mogollon Rim, intending to reach General Springs, a well-known water hole on the Crook Trail. Noticing they were being trailed by a single troop of cavalry, the Apache laid an ambush seven miles north of General Springs, where a fork of East Clear Creek cuts a gorge into the Mogollon Rim. The Apaches hid on the far side and waited. The cavalry company was led by Captain Adna Chaffee. The chief scout, Al Sieber, discovered the Apache trap and warned the troops. During the night, Chaffee's lone company was reinforced by four more from Fort Apache under the command of Major A.W. Evans. Then they were ready to begin the Battle of Big Dry Wash.

=== Geronimo campaign ===
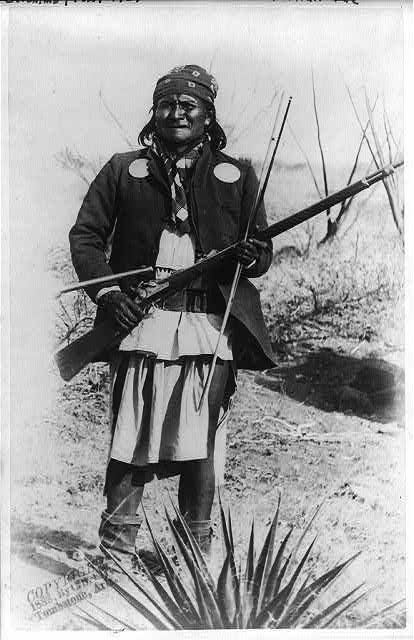
Geronimo, before meeting General Crook on March 27, 1886.

After two decades of guerrilla warfare, Cochise chose to make peace with the U.S. He agreed to relocate his people to a reservation in the Chiricahua Mountains. Soon afterward in 1874, Cochise died. In a change of policy, the U.S. government decided to move the Chiricahua to the San Carlos reservation in 1876. Half complied and the other half, led by Geronimo, escaped to Mexico. In the spring of 1877, the U.S. captured Geronimo and brought him to the San Carlos reservation. He stayed there until September 1881. As soldiers gathered near the reservation, he feared being imprisoned for previous activities. He fled the reservation with 700 Apache and went to Mexico again.

On April 19, 1882, Chiricahua chief Juh attacked the San Carlos reservation and forced Chief Loco to break out. During the hostilities, Juh's warriors killed the chief of police Albert D. Sterling, along with Sagotal, an Apache policeman. Juh led Loco and up to 700 other Apaches back to Mexico.

In the spring of 1883, General George Crook was put in charge of the Arizona and New Mexico Indian reservations. With 200 Apache Scouts, he journeyed to Mexico, found Geronimo's camp, and with Tom Horn as his interpreter, persuaded Geronimo and his people to return to the San Carlos reservation. Chiefs Bonito, Loco, and Nana came with Crook at the time. Juh remained in Mexico where he died accidentally in November. Geronimo did not come until February 1884. Crook instituted several reforms on the reservation, but local newspapers criticized him for being too lenient with the Apache; newspapers of the time demonized Geronimo. On May 17, 1885, Geronimo escaped again to Mexico. Geronimo and his party killed dozens of people during the Bear Valley Raid and similar attacks.

In the spring of 1886, Crook went after Geronimo and caught up with him just over the Mexico border in March. Geronimo and his group fled, and Crook could not catch them. The War Department reprimanded Crook for the failure, and he resigned. He was replaced by Brigadier General Nelson Miles in April 1886. Miles deployed over two dozen heliograph points to coordinate 5,000 soldiers, 500 Apache Scouts, 100 Navajo Scouts, and thousands of civilian militia men against Geronimo and his 24 warriors. Lieutenant. Charles B. Gatewood and his Apache Scouts found Geronimo in Skeleton Canyon in September 1886 and persuaded them to surrender to Miles.

An 1887 letter from Charles Winters from Troop D of the 6th Cavalry Regiment describes a soldier's experiences during the Apache Wars in New Mexico:

Dear Friend!

I will now take and write to you a few lines, to let you know that I am yet alive, and doing well. I joint [sic] the Army in January, 86 and had a good fight with Geronimo and his Indians. I also had two hard fights, where i came very near getting killed, but i got true [sic] alright. I was made Corporal when i first enlisted, but have now got high enough to be in Charge of Troop D. 6th U.S. Cavalry and it requires a good man for to get that office, and that is more than i expected. Charley White from Cranbury came out with me and got in the same Troop with me, and I sent him with twenty more men out on a Scout after Indians and Charley was lucky enough to be shot down by Indians the first day, and only three of my men returned. I was very sorry but it could not be helped.

The Territory of New Mexico is a very nice place never no Winter and lots of Gold and Silver Mines all around but for all that it is a disagreeable place on account of so many Indians. I like it first rate and I think as soon as my five years are up I will go bak [sic] to Old New Jersey but not today. My name isn't Charley Winters no more since i shot that man at Jefferson Barracks when he tried to get away from me. My Captain at time told me to take the name of his son who died and so my name since then is Charles H. Wood. I will now close and hope that you will soon write and let me know how you are getting along. Give my best regards to all and to yourself and oblige.

The Army imprisoned Geronimo and many other Apache men, including some of the local Apache scouts, then they transported them to the East as prisoners of war. They held them at Fort Pickens and Fort Marion in Florida. Northerners vacationing in St. Augustine, where Fort Marion was located, included teachers and missionaries, who became interested in the Apache prisoners. Volunteers participated in teaching the Apache to speak and write English, about Christian religion and elements of American culture. Many citizens raised funds to send nearly 20 of the younger male prisoners to college after they were released from detainment. Most attended Hampton Agricultural and Industrial School, a historically black college. Many Apache died in the prisons. Later, Apache children were taken to the Carlisle Indian Industrial School in Pennsylvania, where fifty of them died. Eventually, after 26 years, the Apache in Florida were released to return to the Southwest, but Geronimo was sent to Fort Sill, Oklahoma, where he died.

=== Post-1887 period ===
Despite the surrender of Geronimo and his followers in 1886, Apache warriors continued warfare against Americans and Mexicans. U.S. forces went on search and destroy missions against the small war parties, using tactics including solar signaling, wire telegraph, joint American and Mexican intelligence sharing, allied Indian Scouts, and local quick reaction posse groups.

The U.S. Cavalry had several expeditions against the Apache after 1886. During one of them, 10th Cavalry and 4th Cavalry forces under First Lieutenant James W. Watson pursued mounted Apache warriors north of Globe, Arizona, along the Salt River. During the Cherry Creek campaign, Sergeant James T. Daniels of the 4th Cavalry, and Sergeant William McBryar of the 10th Cavalry, and Sergeant Y. B. Rowdy of the Apache Scouts are the last recipients of the Medal of Honor for actions during the Apache Wars.

== See also ==
- Arizona War
- Indian Campaign Medal
- Navajo Wars
- Buffalo Soldiers
- Emmet Crawford
- King Woolsey
- Battle at Pozo Hediondo
- List of wars involving the Confederate States of America
- Crawford affair
