= Battle of Cieneguilla =

1854 battle near Pilar, New Mexico, US

- Part of the Jicarilla War, Apache Wars, Ute Wars
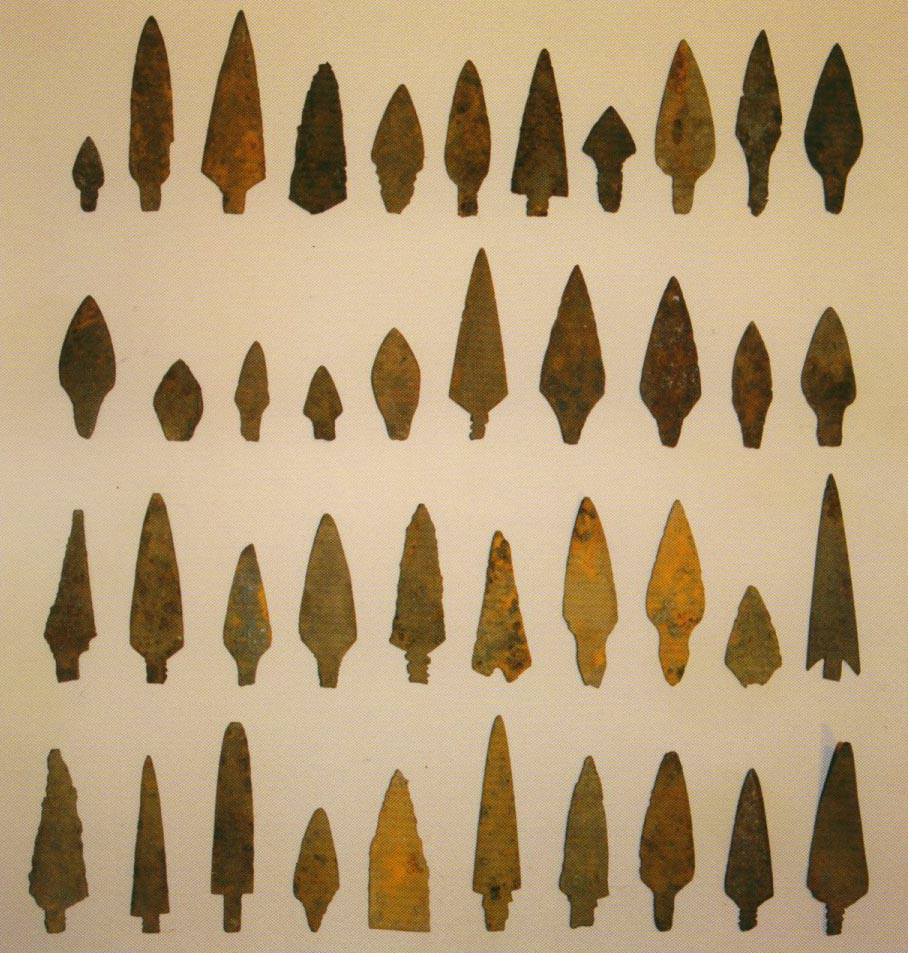
- Metal points from the Cieneguilla Battle Site.
Date	March 30, 1854
Location	near Pilar, New Mexico
Result	Apache/Ute victory

Belligerents
Apache; Ute	United States

Commanders and leaders
Flechas Rayada	John W. Davidson

Strength
200 to 300 warriors	60 cavalry

Casualties and losses
~50 killed	22 killed 36 wounded

The Battle of Cieneguilla (pronounced sienna-GEE-ya; English: small swamp) was an engagement of the Jicarilla War involving a group of Jicarilla Apaches, possibly their Ute allies, and the American 1st Cavalry Regiment on March 30, 1854 near what is now Pilar, New Mexico. The Santa Fe Weekly Gazette reported that the action "was one of the severest battles that ever took place between American troops and Red Indians." It was one of the first significant battles between American and Apache forces and was also part of the Ute Wars, in which Ute warriors attempted to resist Westward expansion in the Four Corners region.

== Background ==
In March 1854, Companies F and I of the First Dragoons camped at Cantonment Burgwin, an army post 10 miles southeast of Taos. While on patrol, 60 dragoons engaged in an unauthorized attack on the Jicarilla Apache encampment near Pilar, then known as Cieneguilla, after First Lieutenant John Wynn Davidson exceeded the orders of his superior officer, Major Blake.

== Battle ==
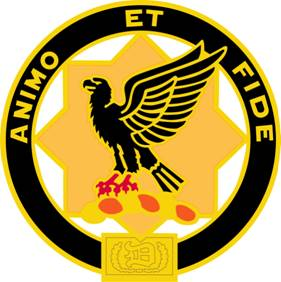
The First Regiment of Dragoons were renamed the 1st Cavalry Regiment in 1861.

On March 30, a combined force of about 250 Apaches and Utes laid an ambush for the U.S. dragoons. In his report after the battle, Davidson stated that "[He] came upon the Apaches near Cieneguilla who at once sounded the war whoop." According to Private James A. Bennett (aka James Bronson), who survived the ambush, the battle lasted about four hours. It started around 8 a.m. and ended when the dragoon regiments retreated at 12 p.m. to Ranchos de Taos. The Apache warriors used flintlock rifles and arrows. Of the 60 dragoons present, the U.S. suffered 22 killed and 36 wounded, along with a loss of 22 horses and much of the troops' supplies.

Another version of the fight presents the view that Davidson and his troops were not ambushed but rather were taunted by the Apaches into attacking a superior force, one that also employed superior tactics. This modern version also has the fight duration being closer to two hours than the four that Davidson and Bennett claimed.

== Aftermath ==
At once, Lieutenant Colonel Philip St. George Cooke of the Second Regiment of Dragoons organized an expedition to pursue the Jicarilla. With the help of Pueblo Indian and Mexican scouts under Captain James H. Quinn, with Kit Carson as the principal guide. After a winter pursuit through the mountains, Cooke caught and defeated them April 8, 1854, at their camp in the canyon of Ojo Caliente. Dispersing in small bands, the Jicarilla evaded further pursuit, but many died from the harsh cold weather.

Much of the blame for the loss of life was put on Davidson, as he was accused of risking the lives of his soldiers when he could have avoided the ambush. However, Brig. Gen. John Garland praised Davidson when stated that "The troops displayed a gallantry seldom equaled in this, or any other country and the Officer in Command, Lieut. Davidson, has given evidence of soldiership in the highest degree creditable to him. To have sustained a deadly control of three hours when he was so greatly outnumbered, and to have retired with the fragment of a company, crippled up, is amazing and calls for the admiration of every true soldier."

On March 10, 1856, Garland called a court of inquiry to meet at Taos, New Mexico. After many witnessing declarations, the court declared that Davidson could not have avoided the confrontation and "that in the battle he exhibited skill in his mode of attacking a greatly superior force of hostile Indians; and prudence, and coolness, and courage, throughout a protracted engagement; and finally, when he was obliged to retire from the field, owing to the great odds opposing him, the losses he had sustained, and the scarcity of ammunition; his exertions to bring off the wounded men merit high praise."

== Archaeological surveys ==
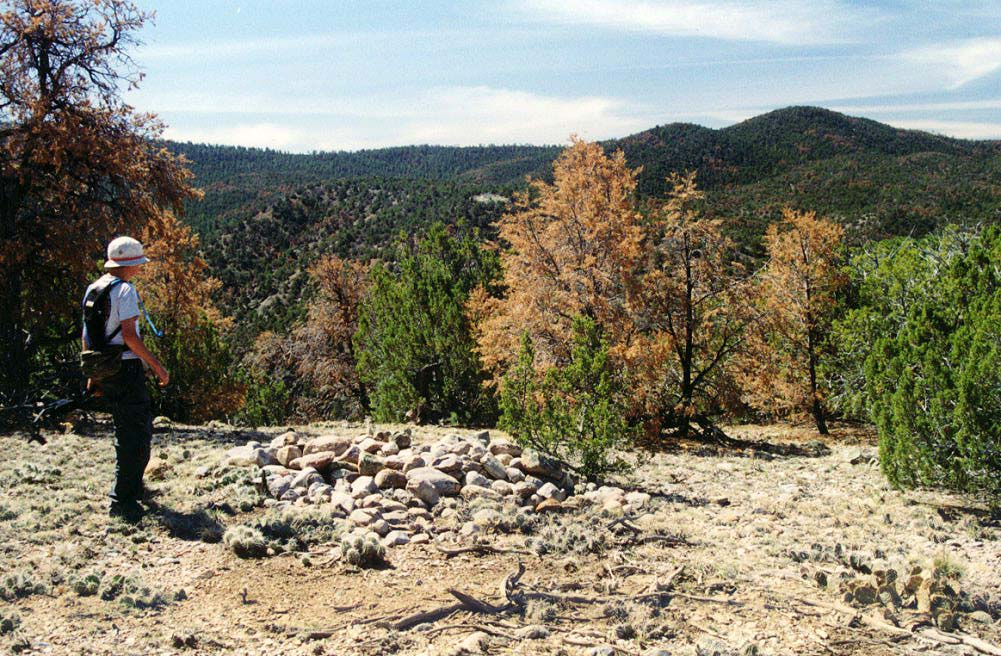
Cenotaph marking where the body of a killed dragoon was found.

In 2001, Carson National Forest received a grant from the National Park Service's American Battlefield Protection Program. The grant was aimed to perform an archaeological excavation at the site of the Battle of Cieneguilla. It took a year to locate the battlefield. Although some artifacts were found on the battlefield, the survey's final findings may be found in Douglas Scott's Fields of Conflict, vol. 2. The findings support most of Lt. Bell's criticisms of Lt. Davidson's tactics and his conclusion that the command had been thoroughly routed.

== See also ==
- List of battles won by Indigenous peoples of the Americas
- Battle of Embudo Pass
- Taos Revolt
- Battle of the Little Bighorn
