= Flechas Rayadas =

Leader of the Jicarillo Apache

Jicarilla Apache leader

Chief

Military service
- Battles/wars: Cieneguilla

Flechas Rayadas or Striped Arrows was a Jicarilla Apache chief of the band that, together with Francisco Chacon's warriors, defeated Lieutenant Davidson's detachment of 60 men from the First Regiment of Dragoons in the Battle of Cieneguilla, in the Embudo Mountains, on April 4, 1854, killing 22 and wounding 36. On April 7, as Lieutenant Colonel Cooke was pursuing the Jicarillas, General Garland sent word to Cooke that Flechas Rayadas had offered to return all the horses and arms captured in that fight if peace could be made; the chief's proposal was rejected.
