= Ute Wars =

Series of conflicts between the US and the Ute people

- Part of the American Indian Wars
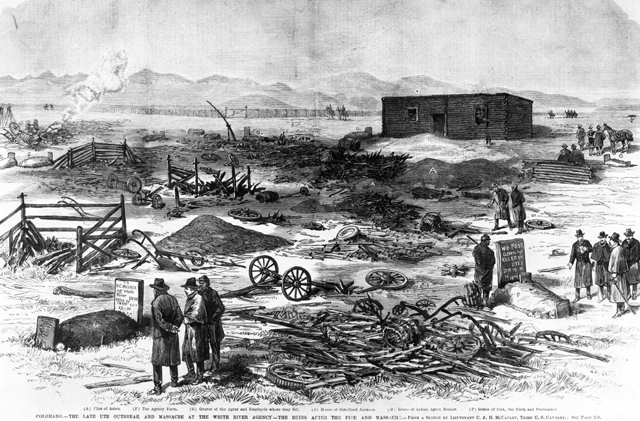
- An etching that appeared in the December 6, 1879 edition of "Frank Leslie's Weekly" depicts the aftermath of the Meeker Massacre.
Date	1849–1923
Location	Colorado, Utah, Arizona, New Mexico
Result	United States victory, Utes moved to reservations.

Belligerents
United States	Ute: Yamparika; Parianuche; Tabeguache; Muhgruhtahveeach; Kapota; Muache; Weminuche; Ute Allies: Paiute; Navajo; Apache

Commanders and leaders
(United States) Brigham Young (United States) John W. Gunnison † (United States) Reddick Allred (United States) Wesley Merritt (United States) Thomas T. Thornburgh †	Walkara; Antonga Black Hawk; Kanosh; Ouray; Polk; Posey †

The Ute Wars were a series of conflicts between the Ute people and the United States between 1849 and 1923.

== Wars ==
- Jicarilla War (1849–1855)
- Battle at Fort Utah (1850)
- Walker War (1853–1854)
- Tintic War (1856)
- Black Hawk War (1865–1872)
- White River War (1879)
- Pinhook Draw fight (15-16 June 1881)
- Beaver Creek Massacre (June 19, 1885) – Cases of cattle-rustling by the Utes on white cattlemen caused tensions that eventually led to a skirmish between the two parties in Beaver Creek. In the gunfight that ensued, cowboys killed six Mountain Ute Indians. It was the last major confrontation between Ute Indians and white settlers in Colorado.
- Ute War (1887)
- Bluff War (1914–1915)
- Bluff Skirmish (1921)
- Posey War (1923)

== See also ==
- Battle Creek Massacre
- Sioux Wars
- Apache Wars
- Navajo Wars
- Comanche Wars

== Bibliography ==
- Decker, Peter R. (2004). The Utes Must Go!. Golden: Fulcrum Publishing. ISBN 1-55591-465-9.
