= Jicarilla Apache =

Native American ethnic group

Jicarilla Dindéi (Jicarilla Apache)
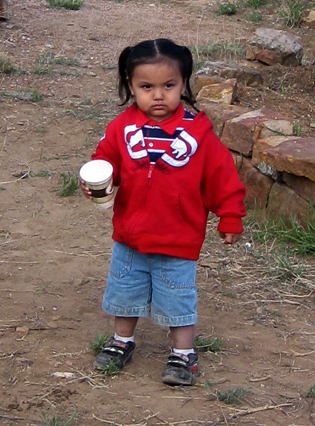
- Young Jicarilla Apache boy, 2009

Total population
- 2,755

Regions with significant populations
- United States (New Mexico)

Languages
- English, Jicarilla

Religion
- Christianity, traditional tribal religion, Native American Church

Related ethnic groups
- Southern Athabaskan peoples (Chiricahua Apache, Kiowa Apache, Lipan Apache, Mescalero Apache, Navajo, Tonto Apache, Western Apache) (Note: Kessel and Wooster identify the 8 related people, but break the Western Apache and Tonto further into bands: San Carlos, Aravaipa, White Mountain, Cibicue, Northern Tonto, Southern Tonto - and include the Mimbreno, a band of the Chiricahua.)

Jicarilla Apache (Spanish: [xikaˈɾiʝa], locally [hɪkəˈɹiə]; Jicarilla Apache: Jicarilla Dindéi), one of several loosely organized autonomous bands of the Eastern Apache, refers to the members of the Jicarilla Apache Nation currently living in New Mexico and speaking a Southern Athabaskan language. The term jicarilla comes from Mexican Spanish meaning "little basket", referring to the small sealed baskets they used as drinking vessels. To neighboring Apache bands, such as the Mescalero and Lipan, they were known as Kinya-Inde ("People who live in fixed houses").

The Jicarilla called themselves also Haisndayin, translated as "people who came from below" because they believed themselves to be the sole descendants of the first people to emerge from the underworld. The underworld was the home of Ancestral Man and Ancestral Woman, who produced the first people. The Jicarilla believed Hascin, their chief deity, created Ancestral Man and Ancestral Woman, as well as all the animals, the sun, and the moon.

The Jicarilla Apache led a seminomadic existence in the Sangre de Cristo Mountains and the plains of southern Colorado and northern New Mexico. They also ranged into the Great Plains starting before 1525 CE. For years, they lived a relatively peaceful life, traveling seasonally to traditional sites for hunting, gathering, and cultivation along river beds. The Jicarilla learned about farming and pottery from the Puebloan peoples and about survival on the plains from the Plains Indians. Their diet and lifestyle were rich and varied. The Jicarilla's farming practices expanded to the point where they required considerable time and energy. As a result, the people became rather firmly settled and tended to engage in warfare less frequently than other Eastern Apache groups. Starting in the 1700s, the Jicarilla experienced encroachment by colonial New Spain, pressure from other Native American tribes such as the Comanches, and subsequent westward expansion of the United States. These factors led to significant loss of property, expulsion from their sacred lands, and relocation to lands unsuited for survival.

The mid-1800s to the mid-1900s were particularly difficult for the Jicarilla. Their tribal bands were displaced, treaties were made and broken with them, and they experienced a significant loss of life due to tuberculosis and other diseases. Additionally, they lacked opportunities for survival. By 1887, they received their reservation, which was expanded in 1907 to include more suitable land for ranching and agriculture. Over several decades, they discovered the rich natural resources of the San Juan Basin beneath the reservation land.

Tribal members transitioned from a seminomadic lifestyle and are now supported by various industries on their reservation, including oil and gas, casino gaming, forestry, ranching, and tourism. The Jicarilla are renowned for their pottery, basketry, and beadwork.

== History ==
=== Early history ===
Jicarilla.

The Jicarilla Apaches are one of the Athabaskan linguistic groups that migrated out of Canada by 1525 CE, possibly several hundred or more years earlier. They eventually settled on what they considered their land, bounded by four sacred rivers in northern New Mexico and southern Colorado–the Rio Grande, Pecos River, Arkansas River, and Canadian River–and containing sacred mountain peaks and ranges. The Jicarilla also ranged out into the plains of northwestern Texas and the western portions of Oklahoma and Kansas. By the 1600s, they inhabited the Chama Valley in present-day New Mexico and the western part of present-day Oklahoma. Before contact with the Spanish, the Apache people lived in relative peace.

The Jicarilla people of the 1600s were seminomadic, engaging in seasonal agriculture they learned from the Pueblo people and Spaniards of New Spain, along the rivers within their territory.

The Apache have historical connections to the Dismal River culture of the western Plains. This culture is often associated with the Paloma and Quartelejo (also known as Cuartelejo) Apaches. Jicarilla Apache pottery has also been found at several Dismal River complex sites. Over time, some of the people from the Dismal River culture joined the Kiowa Apache in the Black Hills of present-day South Dakota. Due to pressure from the west by the Comanche and from the east by the Pawnee and French, the Kiowa and the remaining people of Dismal River culture migrated south, where they eventually joined the Lipan Apache and Jicarilla Apache nations.

By the 1800s, the Jicarilla were planting a variety of crops along the rivers, especially along the upper Arkansas River and its tributaries, sometimes using irrigation to aid in growing squash, beans, pumpkins, melons, peas, wheat, and corn. They found farming in the mountains safer than on the open plains. They primarily hunted buffalo into the 17th century, and, thereafter, hunted antelope, deer, mountain sheep, elk, and buffalo. Jicarilla women gathered berries, agave, honey, onions, potatoes, nuts, and seeds from the wild.

=== Sacred land and creation story ===
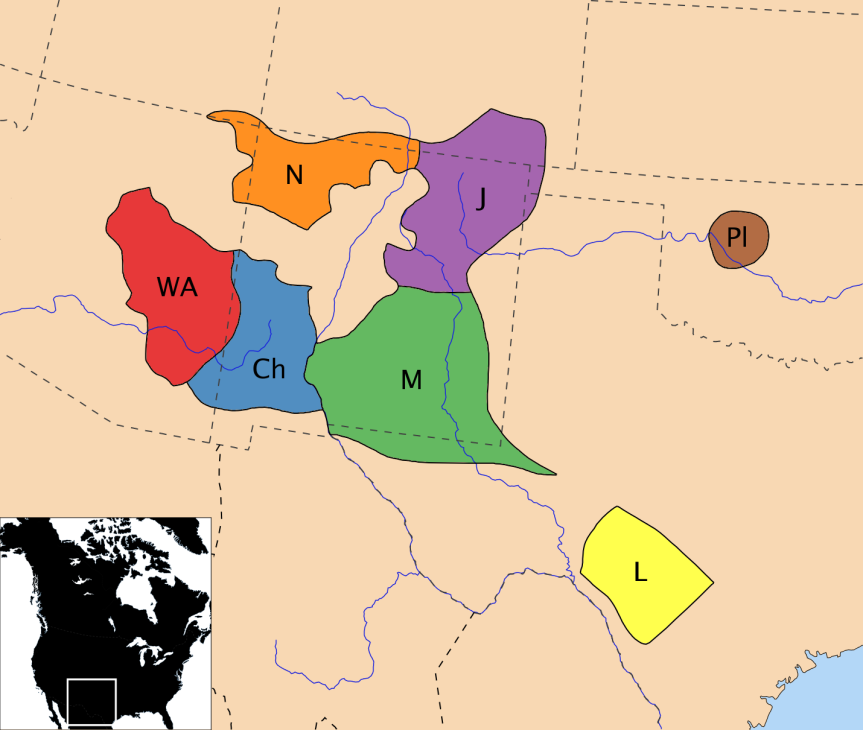
Apachean tribes ca. 18th century: WA – Western Apache, N – Navajo, Ch – Chiricahua, M – Mescalero, J – Jicarilla, L – Lipan, Pl – Plains Apache

In the Jicarilla creation story, the land enclosed by the four sacred rivers was provided to them by the Creator. It included select places for communicating with the Creator and spirits, as well as sacred rivers and mountains to be respected and conserved. Additionally, there were very specific places for obtaining items for ceremonial rituals, such as the white clay found 18 miles (29 km) southeast of Taos, red ochre 20 miles (32 km) north of Taos, and yellow ochre on a mountain near Picuris Pueblo. The Jicarilla people believe the "heart of the world" is located near Taos.

Traditional Jicarilla stories, such as White Shell Woman, Killer of the Enemies, Child of the Water, and others, feature people and places that are special to them. These places include the Rio Grande Gorge, Picuris Pueblo, the spring and marsh near El Prado, Hopewell Lake, and particularly the Taos Pueblo and the four sacred rivers. Additionally, the Jicarilla created shrines in locations that held spiritual significance, some of which were shared with the Taos Pueblo in the Taos area.

In 1865, Father Antonio José Martínez, a priest from New Mexico, documented a connection between the Jicarilla people and Taos. He wrote that the Jicarilla had a long history of living between the mountains and the villages, with pottery making being an important source of income. The clay used for the pottery came from the Taos and Picuris Pueblo areas.

=== Pressures for Jicarilla Apache land ===
The Apaches' traditional culture, economy, and lifestyle became strained by the arrival and growth of other populations, Manifest Destiny, and the Indian Wars. Many people died due to famine, the Indian Wars, including the Battle of Cieneguilla, and diseases not indigenous to the American continent, to which they had no resistance.

When the Comanche, who had obtained guns from the French, and their close allies and kin, the Ute, were expanding onto the plains, they pillaged the various eastern Apache peoples (Jicarilla, Mescalero, and Lipan) who occupied the southern plains in a bid for control. As they were pushed off the plains, the Jicarilla moved to the mountains and near the pueblos and Spanish missions, where they sought alliance with the Puebloan peoples and the Spanish settlers. In 1724, several Apache bands were annihilated by the Comanches, who forced them to "give up half their women and children, and then they burned several villages, killing all but sixty-nine men, two women, and three boys." The Jicarilla people were forced to seek refuge into the eastern Sangre de Cristo Mountains north of the Taos Pueblo in New Mexico. Some moved to the Pecos Pueblo in New Mexico or joined the Mescalero and Lipan bands in Texas. In 1779, a combined force of Jicarilla, Ute, Pueblo, and Spanish soldiers defeated the Comanche, who, after another seven years and several more military campaigns, finally sued for peace. After that, the Jicarilla reestablished themselves in their old tribal territory in southern Colorado.

=== Ollero and Llanero bands ===
The geography of the Jicarilla tribal territory consists of two fundamental environments that helped shape the tribe's basic social organization into two bands: the Llaneros, or plains people, and the Olleros, or mountain valley people.

Beginning in the 19th century, after being pushed out of the plains, the Jicarilla split into two bands:

- The Olleros, the mountain people - pottery making clan, a.k.a. Northern Jicarilla, lived west of the Rio Grande along the Chama River of New Mexico and Colorado, settled down as farmers, became potters and lived partly in Pueblo-like villages. They began subsidizing their livelihood through sales of micaceous clay pottery and basketry and learned to farm from their Pueblo neighbors. Ollero is Spanish for "potters." Their name for themselves is Saidindê for "Sand People," "Mountain People," or "Mountain Dwellers." The Spanish rendering is Hoyeros meaning "mountain-valley people." The Capote Band of Utes (Kapota, Kahpota) lived east of the Great Divide south of the Conejos River and east of the Rio Grande, west towards the Sangre de Cristo Mountains, in the San Luis Valley, along the headwaters of the Rio Grande and the Animas River, centering in the vicinity of present-day Chama and Tierra Amarilla of Rio Arriba County. They formed an alliance with the Olleros, similar to the Muache alliance with the Llanero, against the Southern Plains Tribes such as the Comanche, Southern Arapaho, Southern Cheyenne, and Kiowa, their former allies. They maintained trade relations with Puebloan peoples.
- The Llaneros, the plains people clan, a.k.a. Eastern Jicarilla, lived as nomads in tipis, called kozhan by the Jicarilla. They hunted buffalo on the plains east of the Rio Grande, centering along the headwaters of the Canadian River. During the winter, they lived in the mountains between the Canadian River and the Rio Grande. They camped and traded near Picuris Pueblo, New Mexico, Pecos, New Mexico, and Taos, New Mexico. Their name for themselves is Gulgahén for "Plains People"; the Spanish picked it up as Llaneros - "Plains Dwellers".

=== Battle of Cieneguilla ===
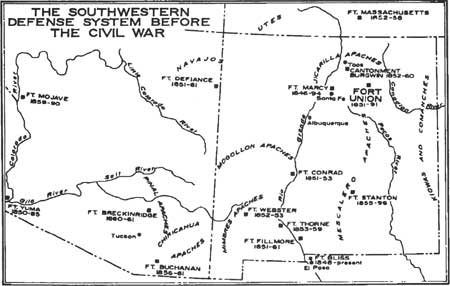
Southwestern Defense System before the Civil War. Source:National Park Service

The Battle of Cieneguilla (pronounced sienna-GEE-ya; English: small swamp) was an engagement of a group of Jicarilla Apaches, their Ute allies, and the American 1st Cavalry Regiment on March 30, 1854, near what is now Pilar, New Mexico.

==== Background ====
By the mid-1800s, tensions between the Spanish, multiple Native American nations, and westward expanding United States settlers erupted as all sought and laid claim to land in the southwest. Diseases to which Native Americans had no immunity "decimated" their tribes, creating greater pressure for their lands to be taken from them. As tensions among Native Americans grew and with numerous attempts to relocate them from their traditional hunting and gathering land and sacred homelands, the Jicarilla became increasingly hostile in their efforts to protect their lands. The United States military developed a defense system of forts and troops to restrict attacks on westward travelers. Fort Union was established, in part, to provide protection from the Jicarillas. The disruption and "mutual incomprehensions" of one another's culture led to warfare among the Spanish, Native American nations, and Americans.

Leo E. Oliva, author of Fort Union and the Frontier Army in the Southwest, notes that: "The three cultural groups in the Southwest had different concepts of family life, personal values, social relations, religion, uses and ownership of land and other property, how best to obtain the provisions of life, and warfare."

Fort Union was established by Colonel Edwin Vose Sumner, who ordered Major James Henry Carleton's Company K 1st Dragoons on August 2, 1851, to protect westward travelers between Missouri and New Mexico Territory on the Santa Fe Trail. New Mexico Territory's Governor William Carr Lane made treaties with the Jicarilla and other Native American tribes of New Mexico to relocate them to reservations where they would peacefully take up agriculture on new lands. Both parties agreed to payments to compensate the Native Americans for their loss of access to hunting, gathering, and sacred homeland. The U.S. government, however, pulled the funding for this agreement, betraying the Native American tribal members. Further complicating the situation, all the crops planted by the tribal members failed and the people continued raiding for survival.

==== Battle and aftermath ====
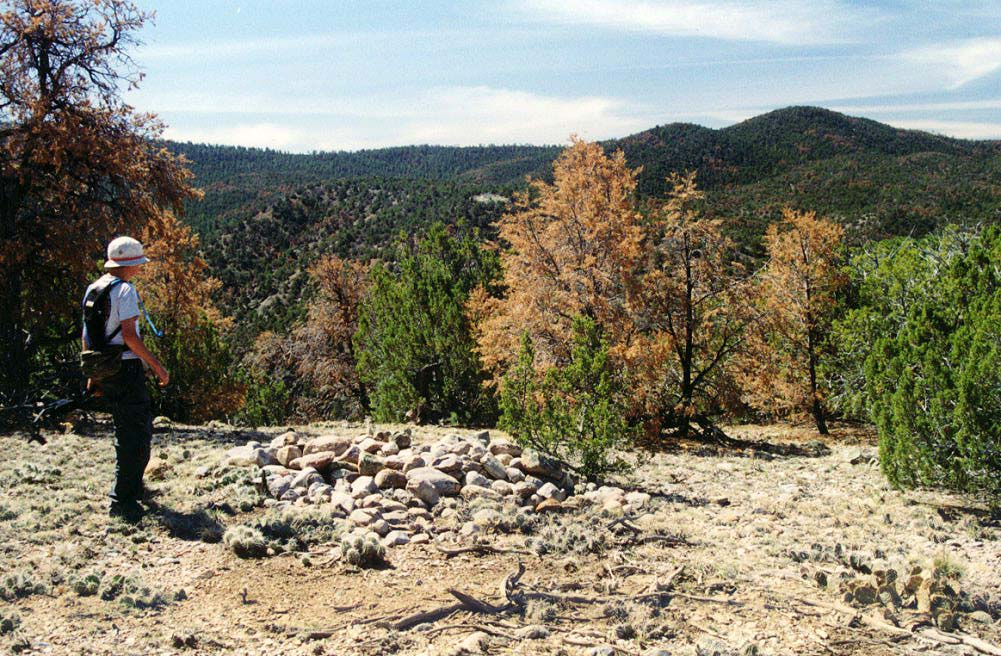
Cenotaph marking where the body of a killed dragoon was found

In March 1854, Lobo Blanco, a Jicarilla chief, led a band of 30 warriors to raid the horse herd of a contractor for Fort Union. A detachment of 2nd U.S. Dragoons, led by Lieutenant David Bell, pursued the raiders. They engaged in a fight on the Canadian River and killed many of the Jicarilla, including the chief, who was repeatedly wounded and finally crushed to death under a boulder.

In late March, Major George A. Blake, commanding officer at Burgwin Cantonment, sent a detachment of 1st U.S. Dragoon of 60 men (company I and part of company F) to patrol along the Santa Fe trail. On March 30, 1854, a combined force of about 250 Apaches and Utes fought the U.S. dragoons, led by Lieutenant John Wynn Davidson, near Pilar, New Mexico, then known as Cieneguilla. The battle lasted for two or four hours, according to surviving soldier James A. Bennett (aka James Bronson). The Jicarilla, led by their principal chief, Francisco Chacon, and Flechas Rayadas, fought with flintlock rifles and arrows, killing 22 and a wounding another 36 of 60 dragoon soldiers, who then retreated to Ranchos de Taos lighter by 22 horses and most of the troops' supplies.

Lieutenant Colonel Philip St. George Cooke of the 2nd Dragoons Regiment quickly organized an expedition to pursue the Jicarilla with the help of 32 Pueblo Indian and Mexican scouts under Captain James H. Quinn, with Kit Carson as the principal guide. After a winter pursuit through the mountains, Cooke caught up with the Jicarilla. Jicarilla leader, Flechas Rayadas, offered an agreement for peace in exchange for the horses and guns that the Jicarilla acquired from the Battle, but the offer was not accepted. On April 8, Cooke's forces fought tribal members at their camp in the canyon of Ojo Caliente. The Jicarilla dispersed in small groups to evade further pursuit, but many died from the harsh cold weather.

A large unit under Major James H. Carleton fought again the Jicarillas near Fisher's Peak in the Raton Mountains, killing several of them. Francisco Chacon replied by trying an ambush against the soldiers with 150 warriors, but his group was bypassed. Subsequently, five warriors were killed, six wounded, and seventeen women and children were scattered and may have died of cold and hunger during the flight. In May, Francisco Chacon sent word to Santa Fe for peace and surrendered at Abiquiu.

=== Jicarilla reservation ===
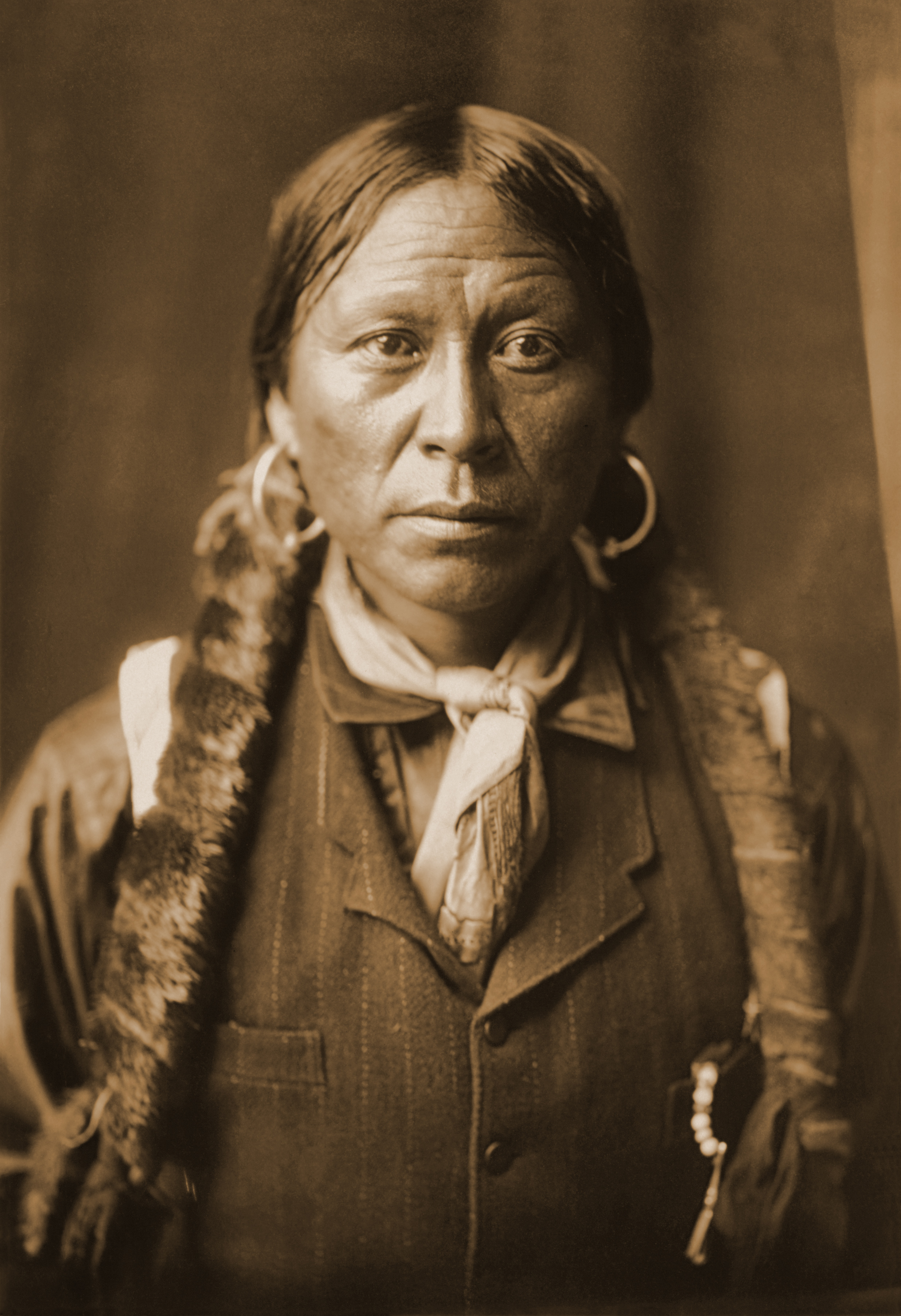
Portrait of a Jicarilla man, 1904

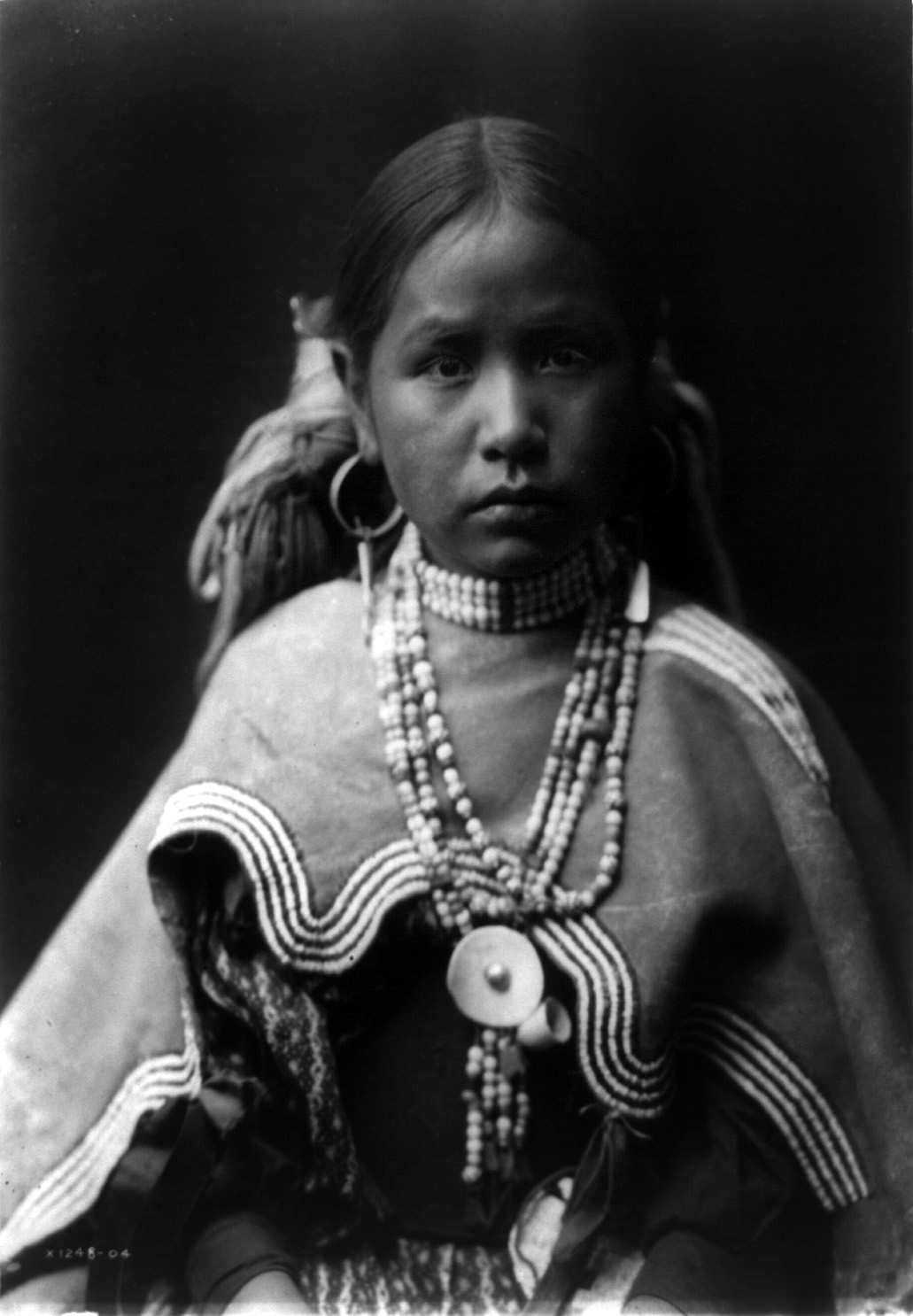
Portrait of a Jicarilla maiden, 1905

Beginning in the mid-1850s, following the westward expansion of the U.S. and its impact on their livelihoods, attempts began to relocate the Jicarilla Apache, who became increasingly hostile to these pressures. In addition, relations with the Spanish also became hostile when they captured and sold Apache tribal members into slavery. After years of warfare, broken treaties, relocation, and being the only southwestern tribe without a reservation, the Jicarilla Llanero and Ollero bands united in 1873. They sent a delegation to Washington, D.C., to request a reservation. Eventually, U.S. President Grover Cleveland created the Jicarilla Apache Reservation through an executive order signed on February 11, 1887.

After finally securing a reservation, it was spiritually disheartening for them to accept that they would no longer roam on their traditional holy lands and have access to their sacred places. When they arrived, the two bands settled in separate areas of the Reservation. The animosities stemming from this period have persisted into the twentieth century, with the Olleros generally identified as progressives and the Llaneros as conservatives.

The land on the reservation, except that held by non-tribal members, was not suitable for agriculture. As a means of survival, the tribe sold timber from the reservation. In 1907, additional land was secured for the reservation, totaling 742,315 acres (3,004 km^{2}), suitable for sheep ranching, which became profitable in the 1920s. Until that time, many people suffered from malnutrition, and up to 90% of the tribe members had tuberculosis in 1914. By the 1920s, it seemed likely that the Jicarilla Apache nation may become extinct due to trachoma, tuberculosis, and other diseases. After several difficult ranching periods, many of the previous sheep herders relocated to the tribal headquarters in Dulce, New Mexico. The Jicarilla suffered due to a lack of economic opportunities for decades.

Oil and gas development began on the reservation after World War II, generating up to $1 million annually. Some of this revenue was set aside for a tribal scholarship fund and to develop the Stone Lake Lodge facility. In 1982, the U.S. Supreme Court ruled in Merrion v. Jicarilla Apache Tribe, 455 U.S. 130 (1982) that the tribe had the authority to impose severance taxes on oil companies drilling for oil and natural gas on reservation land.

As a means of repayment for lost tribal lands, the Jicarilla received a settlement in 1971 for $9.15 million. The Jicarilla Apache made a claim for compensation to the U.S. Government when the Indian Claims Commission was created. A two-volume technical report was submitted to the Commission on Spanish and Mexican grants, both unconfirmed and confirmed as part of the case. The tribe was awarded $9,150,000 in the commission's final judgment on April 20, 1971.

In 2019, the census showed that there were 3,353 people living on the reservation. The New Mexico Tourism Department reports that there are approximately "2,755 tribal members, most of whom live in the town of Dulce."

== Tribal government ==
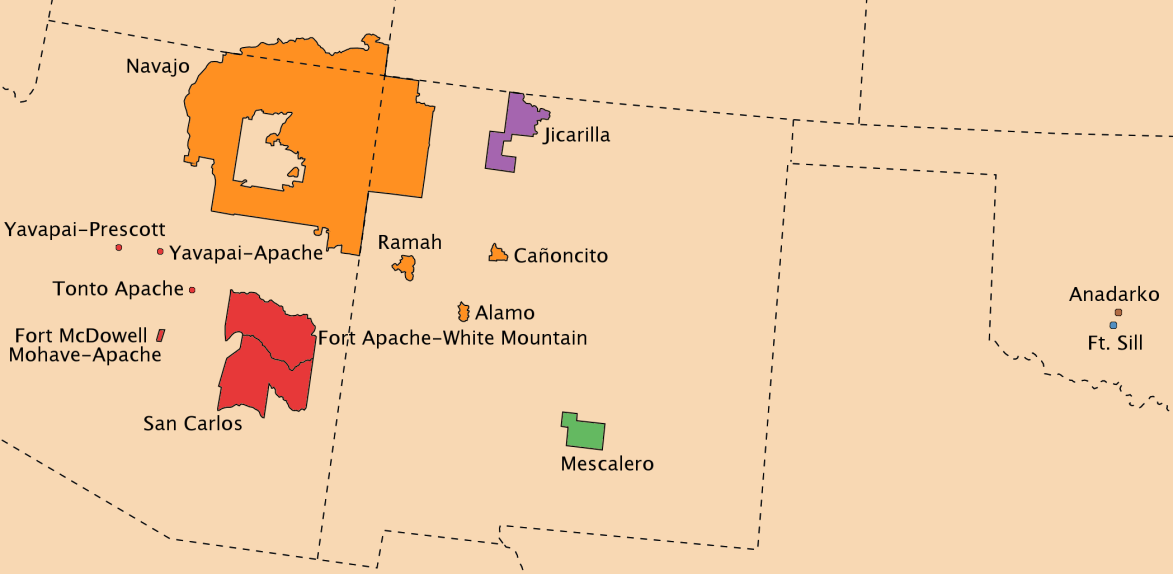
Present location Apache peoples including Jicarilla.

The Jicarilla Apache are a federally recognized tribal entity that, in 1937, organized a formal government and adopted a constitution. Traditional tribal leaders were elected as their first tribal council members. In 2000, the tribe officially changed their name to the Jicarilla Apache Nation.

Veronica E. Velarde Tiller, author of Culture and Customs of the Apache Indians, writes: "All the powers of the tribal governments reflected the traditional values of the Apache people. The protection, preservation, and conservation of the bounty of 'Mother Earth', and all its inhabitants is sacred value shared by all Indian people, and the Apaches were most eager to have this concept incorporated into their tribal constitution."

The Apache Indians integrated the important value of sharing into their constitution by declaring that the resources of the reservation are "held for the benefit of the entire tribe" Further, all land on the reservation is held by the Jicarilla Apache Reservation. It is one of only two reservations in the United States where land is not owned by individuals but by the tribal nation as a whole. Tribal members are individuals who are at least 3/8 Jicarilla Apache.

The government is made up of the following branches:

- executive, with a president and vice-president serving four-year terms;
- legislative, with eight members serving staggering four-year terms; and
- judicial, tribal court and appellate court judges assigned by the president.

Dulce, a city near the extreme north border of New Mexico, serves as the capital of the Jicarilla Apache Nation, with over 95 percent of the reservation's population residing there. Most tribal offices are located in Dulce.

== Reservation ==
Location of Jicarilla Apache Indian Reservation

The Jicarilla Apache Indian Reservation, at 36°33′16″N 107°04′26″W, is located within two northern New Mexico counties:

- Rio Arriba County
- Sandoval County.

from the Colorado border south to Cuba, New Mexico. The reservation sits along U.S. Route 64 and N.M. 537.

In 2022, the U.S. Census Bureau reported that the reservation has a land area of 1,316.1 sq mi (3,409 km^{2}) and had a population of 2,596.

The southern half of the reservation is open plains and the northern portion resides in the treed Rocky Mountains. Mammals and birds migratory paths cross the reservation seasonally, including mountain lion, black bear, elk, Canada geese, and turkey. Rainbow, brown and cutthroat trout are stocked in seven lakes on the reservation, but annual conditions such as low precipitation result in high pH-levels. From 1995 to 2000, the lake levels were severely low due to drought. As a result, most of the fish were killed off during those years. The reservation sits on the San Juan Basin, which is rich in fossil fuels. The basin is the largest producer of oil along the Rocky Mountains and the second largest producer of natural gas in the United States.

== Culture ==
The Jicarilla are traditionally matrilocal and are organized into matrilineal clans. They have incorporated some practices of their Pueblo neighbors into their own traditions. They are renowned for their fine basket making of distinctive diamond, cross, zig-zag designs, or representations of deer, horses or other animals. They are also known for their beadwork and for keeping Apache fiddle-making alive.

As of 2000, about 70% of the tribe practice an organized religion, many of whom are Christians. The Jicarilla language is spoken by about one half of the tribal members, most by older men and women.

Ceremonial practices consist of:

- Puberty feast, called "keesta" in Jicarilla, is a rite of passage ceremony for girls or young women.

Annual events include:

- Little Beaver Celebration with a pow-wow, rodeo, draft horse pull, and a five-mile race in mid-July.
- Stone Lake Fiesta with ceremonial dances, rodeo, and footraces each September 14 and 15.

== Economy ==
The Jicarilla Apache Nation's economy is based upon mining, forestry, gaming, tourism, retail, and agriculture, including:

- oil and gas wells, owned and operated by the tribe
- solar farms on tribal lands
- timber
- cattle and sheep ranching
- reservation government employees, which include about 50% of tribal members
- Dulce business employees
- traditional arts, including basketry and pottery
- Tribe-owned Apache Nugget Casino north of Cuba, New Mexico and the Best Western Jicarilla Inn and Casino in Dulce
- operation of tribe-owned radio station KCIE (90.5 FM) in Dulce, NM.

Although the mid twentieth century brought additional economic opportunities, high unemployment and a low standard of living prevails for tribal members. From the Tiller's Guide to Indian Country: Economic Profiles of American Reservations, 2005 edition:

Unemployment rate – 14.2%
Labor force – 1,1051

The Jicarilla people live in houses with a lifestyle similar to that of other Americans. The cost of food at local grocery stores is higher than in larger U.S. cities nearby. They have access to all modern conveniences and use them based on their preferences and financial means. High unemployment and poverty-level income rates have led to high crime rates. This is largely due to a high incidence of [alcohol] abuse, which averages 1.7% in the Native American population and reaches 30% in some rural areas or reservations.

== Education ==
Children attend a public school on the reservation. Until the 1960s, few children graduated high school. However, since the 1960s, the Bureau of Indian Affairs' educational programs and the Chester A. Faris scholarship programs, funded by oil and gas revenues, provide opportunities for higher education. In the 1970s, some tribal members obtained graduate degrees. Educational assistance offices were created by Apache tribes in the 1980s to help students navigate their educational career.

Portions of the reservation in Rio Arriba County are zoned to Dulce Independent Schools, Chama Valley Independent Schools, and Jemez Mountain Public Schools. Portions of the reservation in Sandoval County are zoned to Cuba Independent Schools.

== Notable people ==
- Francisco Chacon, 19th century chief, leader of the Jicarilla uprising in 1854
- Flechas Rayadas, 19th century chief, involved in the Jicarilla uprising of 1854
- Lobo Blanco, 19th century chief killed in 1854
- Viola Cordova (1937-2002), philosopher
- Tammie Allen (born 1964), potter

== See also ==
- Jicarilla language
- Battle of Cieneguilla
- Dulce Base
- KCIE (FM)
- List of Indian reservations in the United States
- Mescalero
- Morris Edward Opler, ethnographer who wrote about the Jicarilla
- A Gunfight, 1971 film financed by the Jicarilla Apache tribe

== Sources ==
- Brooks, Clinton E.; Reeve, Frank D.; Bennett, James A. (1996). Forts and Forays: James A. Bennett, A Dragoon in New Mexico, 1850–1856. University of New Mexico Press. ISBN 0-8263-1690-5.
- Cassells, E. Steve. (1997). The Archeology of Colorado, Revised Edition. Boulder, Colorado: Johnson Books. ISBN 1-55566-193-9.
- Carlisle, Jeffrey D. (May 2001). "Spanish Relations with the Apache Nations east of the Rio Grande". University of North Texas.
- Carter, Harvey Lewis. (1990) "Dear Old Kit": The Historical Christopher Carson, University of Oklahoma Press. ISBN 0-8061-2253-6.
- Davidson, Homer K. (1974). Black Jack Davidson, A Cavalry Commander on the Western Frontier: The Life of General John W. Davidson. A. H. Clark Co. Page 72. ISBN 0-87062-109-2.
- Eiselt, B. Sunday. (2009) The Jicarilla Apaches and the Archaeology of the Taos Region. Between the Mountains – Beyond the Mountains. Papers of the Archaeological Society of New Mexico Vol. 35, Albuquerque.
- Gibbon, Guy E.; Ames, Kenneth M. (1998) Archaeology of Prehistoric Native America: An Encyclopedia. ISBN 0-8153-0725-X.
- Goddard, Pliny E. (1911). Jicarilla Apache texts. Anthropological papers of the American Museum of Natural History (Vol. 8). New York: The American Museum of Natural History.
- Gorenfeld, Will. (Feb, 2008). "The Battle of Cieneguilla." Wild West magazine.
- Greenwald, Emily. (2002). Reconfiguring the reservation: The Nez Perces, Jicarilla Apache and the Dawes Act. University of New Mexico Press. ISBN 0-8263-2408-8.
- Griffin-Pierce, Trudy. (2000). Native Peoples of the Southwest. University of New Mexico Press. ISBN 0-8263-1908-4.
- Hook, Jason; Pegler, Martin. (2001). To Love and Die in the West: the American Indian Wars, 1860-90. Chicago: Fitzroy Dearborn Publishers. ISBN 1-57958-370-9.
- Kessel, William B.; Wooster, Robert. (ed.) (2005). Encyclopedia of Native American Wars and Warfare. New York: Facts on File. ISBN 0-8160-3337-4.
- King, Lesley S. (2011). Frommer's New Mexico Hoboken, NJ: Wiley Publishing. ISBN 978-0-470-87617-6.
- Martin, Craig. (ed.) (2002). Fly Fishing in Northern New Mexico. University of New Mexico Press. ISBN 978-0-8263-2761-1.
- Oliva, Leo E. (1993).Fort Union and the Frontier Army in the Southwest: Fort Union, New Mexico Military Operations Before the Civil War. National Park Service Online Books.
- Pritzker, Barry M. (2000). A Native American Encyclopedia: History, Culture, and Peoples. Oxford: Oxford University Press. ISBN 978-0-19-513877-1.
- Rajtar, Steve. (1999) Indian War Sites: A Guidebook to Battlefields, Monuments, and Memorials. Jefferson, North Carolina: McFarland & Company, Inc.
- Velarde Tiller, Veronica E. (2011) Culture and Customs of the Apache Indians. Santa Barbara, CA: Greenwood of ABC-CLIO. ISBN 978-0-313-36452-5.
- Warren, Nancy Hunter; Velarde Tiller, Veronica E. (2006). The Jicarilla Apache: A Portrait. University of New Mexico Press. ISBN 0-8263-3776-7.
