= National Register of Historic Places listings in Gila County, Arizona =

Location of Gila County in Arizona

This is a list of the National Register of Historic Places listings in Gila County, Arizona.

This is intended to be a complete list of the properties and districts on the National Register of Historic Places in Gila County, Arizona, United States. The locations of National Register properties and districts for which the latitude and longitude coordinates are included below may be seen in a map.

There are 53 properties and districts listed on the National Register in the county, including 1 that is also a National Historic Landmark.

This National Park Service list is complete through NPS recent listings posted August 21, 2026.

== Current listings ==
	Name on the Register	Image	Date listed	Location	City or town	Description
1	Archeological Site No. AR-03-12-06-1130(TNF)		April 21, 1989 (#89000273)	Address Restricted	Punkin Center	
2	Archeological Site No. AR-03-12-06-1131(TNF)		April 21, 1989 (#89000274)	Address Restricted	Punkin Center	
3	Besh-Ba-Gowah	Besh-Ba-Gowah	May 9, 1984 (#84000648)	South of Globe; 33°22′55″N 110°46′19″W	Globe	
4	Black River Bridge		September 30, 1988 (#88001619)	Indian Route 9 the over Black River; 33°42′46″N 110°12′40″W	Carrizo	
5	Bullion Plaza School	Bullion Plaza School	January 4, 2001 (#00001591)	150 N. Plaza Circle Drive; 33°23′39″N 110°52′46″W	Miami	Trost & Trost-designed school built in 1923 to facilitate segregation of Mexican American children. Now the Bullion Plaza Museum.
6	Cline Terrace Platform Mound (AR-03-12-06-132 TNF)		April 21, 1989 (#89000269)	Address Restricted	Punkin Center	
7	Coolidge Dam	Coolidge Dam	October 29, 1981 (#81000135)	Southwest of San Carlos; 33°10′26″N 110°31′37″W	San Carlos	
8	Cordova Avenue Bridge	Cordova Avenue Bridge	March 31, 1989 (#88001690)	Cordova Ave. over Bloody Tanks Wash; 33°23′52″N 110°52′20″W	Miami	
9	Diamond Point Lookout Cabin		January 28, 1988 (#87002493)	Tonto National Forest; 34°17′15″N 111°11′32″W	Tonto Village	
10	Dominion Hotel	Dominion Hotel	May 22, 1978 (#78000545)	S. Broad St. 33°23′42″N 110°47′11″W	Globe	Demolished after fire in 1980s.
11	Elks Building	Elks Building	August 6, 1987 (#87000860)	155 W. Mesquite; 33°23′51″N 110°47′19″W	Globe	
12	Fossil Creek Bridge	Fossil Creek Bridge	September 30, 1988 (#88001620)	Forest Service Rd. over Fossil Creek; 34°23′39″N 111°37′45″W	Strawberry	
13	Gila County Courthouse	Gila County Courthouse	May 27, 1975 (#75000347)	Oak and Broad Sts. 33°23′46″N 110°47′11″W	Globe	
14	Gila Pueblo	Gila Pueblo	November 17, 1977 (#77000235)	South of Globe; 33°21′53″N 110°46′01″W	Globe	
15	Gila Valley Bank and Trust Building	Gila Valley Bank and Trust Building	August 6, 1987 (#87000861)	292 N. Broad St. 33°23′47″N 110°46′34″W	Globe	
16	Globe Downtown Historic District	Globe Downtown Historic District	May 28, 1987 (#87000862)	Broad St. between Cedar and Tebbs; 33°23′41″N 110°47′07″W	Globe	
17	Globe Mine Rescue Station	Globe Mine Rescue Station	June 7, 1990 (#90000875)	1330 N. Broad St. 33°24′35″N 110°47′43″W	Globe	Now the Gila County Historical Museum.
18	Holy Angels Church	Holy Angels Church	December 1, 1983 (#83003448)	231 S. Broad St. 33°23′41″N 110°47′08″W	Globe	
19	Houston Mesa Ruins	Houston Mesa Ruins	September 4, 1986 (#86002191)	Address Restricted	Payson	
20	Hunt Farmstead Historic District		March 29, 2021 (#100006316)	4223 North Pine Creek Rd. 34°23′35″N 111°27′19″W	Pine	
21	Inspiration Avenue Bridge	Inspiration Avenue Bridge	March 31, 1989 (#88001691)	Inspiration Ave. over Bloody Tanks Wash; 33°23′55″N 110°52′17″W	Miami	
22	International House	International House	March 31, 1988 (#88000233)	634-638 N. Broad St. 33°24′01″N 110°47′24″W	Globe	
23	Keystone Avenue Bridge	Keystone Avenue Bridge	March 31, 1989 (#88001692)	Keystone Ave. over Bloody Tanks Wash; 33°23′57″N 110°52′13″W	Miami	
24	Kinishba Ruins	Kinishba Ruins	October 15, 1966 (#66000180)	Address Restricted	Whiteriver	Pueblo ruins, designated a National Historic Landmark
25	Miami Avenue Bridge	Miami Avenue Bridge	March 31, 1989 (#88001693)	Miami Ave. over Bloody Tanks Wash; 33°23′59″N 110°52′10″W	Miami	
26	Miami Community Church	Miami Community Church	March 15, 2005 (#05000137)	305 W. Live Oak St. 33°23′59″N 110°52′06″W	Miami	
27	Pryor Miller House	Pryor Miller House	March 10, 2004 (#04000146)	3800 State Route 87; 34°23′08″N 111°27′16″W	Pine	
28	Natural Bridge Lodge	Natural Bridge Lodge	August 21, 1986 (#86001558)	Off State Route 87; 34°19′20″N 111°27′11″W	Payson	
29	Oak Creek Platform Mound (AR-03-12-06-714 TNF)		April 21, 1989 (#89000271)	Address Restricted	Punkin Center	
30	Our Lady of the Blessed Sacrament Church	Our Lady of the Blessed Sacrament Church	January 2, 2008 (#07001332)	844 W. Sullivan St. 33°23′50″N 110°52′29″W	Miami	
31	Ox Bow Inn	Ox Bow Inn	October 1, 2004 (#04001073)	607 W. Main St. 34°13′51″N 111°20′10″W	Payson	Rustic inn with design elements copied from Yellowstone's Old Faithful Inn
32	Park Creek Platform Mound (AR-03-12-06-1044 TNF)		April 21, 1989 (#89000272)	Address Restricted	Punkin Center	
33	Perkins Store		February 5, 1999 (#99000108)	State Route 288, 1.5 miles southwest of Young; 34°05′46″N 110°57′38″W	Young	
34	Pinal Ranger Station	Pinal Ranger Station	June 10, 1993 (#93000526)	South of Globe in the Tonto National Forest; 33°22′40″N 110°46′13″W	Globe	
35	Pine Community Center Historic District	Pine Community Center Historic District	February 24, 2005 (#05000068)	Bounded by Randall Dr., State Routes 87/260, unnamed service road, and Pine Creek Dr. 34°23′16″N 111°27′16″W	Pine	
36	Pleasant Valley Ranger Station	Pleasant Valley Ranger Station	June 10, 1993 (#93000527)	South of State Route 288 in the Tonto National Forest; 34°06′53″N 110°56′27″W	Young	
37	Alfred Jason Randall House	Alfred Jason Randall House	September 29, 2000 (#00001165)	State Route 87; 34°23′11″N 111°27′15″W	Pine	
38	Reppy Avenue Bridge	Reppy Avenue Bridge	September 30, 1988 (#88001689)	Reppy Ave. over Bloody Tanks Wash; 33°23′45″N 110°52′33″W	Miami	
39	Rye Creek Ruin Platform Mound Complex Archeological District		November 24, 1995 (#95001311)	Address Restricted	Rye	
40	St. John's Episcopal Church	St. John's Episcopal Church	November 22, 1977 (#77000234)	185 E. Oak St. 33°23′47″N 110°47′11″W	Globe	
41	Salt River Bridge	Salt River Bridge	September 30, 1988 (#88001604)	State Route 288 over the Salt River at milepost 262.4; 33°37′09″N 110°55′15″W	Roosevelt	
42	Salt River Canyon Bridge	Salt River Canyon Bridge	September 30, 1988 (#88001608)	U.S. Route 60 over the Salt River at milepost 292.9; 33°47′19″N 110°30′50″W	Carrizo	
43	La Santa Cruz de Globe	La Santa Cruz de Globe	April 22, 2011 (#11000205)	Hilltop in Ruiz Canyon, east of Navarro Dr. and west of Side Canyon; 33°23′20″N 110°47′00″W	Globe	
44	Schoolhouse Point (AR-03-12-06-13 TNF)		April 21, 1989 (#89000267)	Address Restricted	Roosevelt	
45	Soderman Building	Soderman Building	May 11, 2000 (#00000465)	198 N. Chisholm Ave. 33°23′56″N 110°52′21″W	Miami	
46	Strawberry School	Strawberry School	May 10, 2005 (#05000422)	9318 Fossil Creek Rd., approximately 1.5 miles west of State Routes 87/260; 34°24′23″N 111°31′08″W	Strawberry	
47	Theodore Roosevelt Dam National Register District	Theodore Roosevelt Dam National Register District	March 16, 1998 (#98000144)	Linear area along the shore of Lake Roosevelt from the dam to the canal intake 33°39′19″N 111°04′54″W	Roosevelt	District includes resources that were involved in the construction of the dam, but the dam itself is not a contributing property
48	Thompson Draw Summer Homes Unit 1 Historic District		July 23, 2014 (#14000420)	221-584 Coyote Tr., 151-298 Ring Tail Wy., 14-194 Blue Jay Cir., 150-297 Kit Fox Pass; 34°18′10″N 111°06′11″W	Payson	
49	Tonto National Monument Archeological District	Tonto National Monument Archeological District	October 15, 1966 (#66000081)	Address Restricted	Roosevelt	
50	Tonto National Monument Visitor Center	Tonto National Monument Visitor Center	September 9, 2010 (#10000734)	Arizona State Highway 188; 33°38′42″N 111°06′47″W	Gila	
51	Tonto National Monument, Lower Ruin (AZ U:8:047A ASM)	Tonto National Monument, Lower Ruin (AZ U:8:047A ASM)	April 21, 1989 (#89000265)	Off State Route 188; 33°38′40″N 111°06′56″W	Roosevelt	
52	Tonto National Monument, Upper Ruin (AZ U:8:048 ASM)	Tonto National Monument, Upper Ruin (AZ U:8:048 ASM)	April 21, 1989 (#89000266)	Off State Route 188; 33°38′27″N 111°06′56″W	Roosevelt	
53	US Post Office and Courthouse-Globe Main	US Post Office and Courthouse-Globe Main	December 3, 1985 (#85003106)	101 S. Hill Street; 33°23′45″N 110°47′08″W	Globe	

== Former listings ==
	Name on the Register	Image	Date listed	Date removed	Location	City or town	Description
1	Zane Grey Lodge		May 31, 1974 (#74000453)	October 2, 1992	N of Kohl's Ranch	Kohl's Ranch	Destroyed in the Dude fire, 1990.
2	Haught Cabin		August 4, 1987 (#87001515)	November 6, 1992	4 mi. N of Kohl's Ranch; 34°13′56″N 111°20′40″W	Payson	Removed due to relocation to Green Valley Park in Payson.
3	Old Dominion Library	Old Dominion Library	May 22, 1978 (#78000546)	September 11, 1981	Murphy St.	Globe	Destroyed by fire March 12, 1981.

== See also ==
- List of National Historic Landmarks in Arizona
- National Register of Historic Places listings in Arizona
