= Globe Downtown Historic District =

Historic district in Arizona, United States

- U.S. National Register of Historic Places
- U.S. Historic district
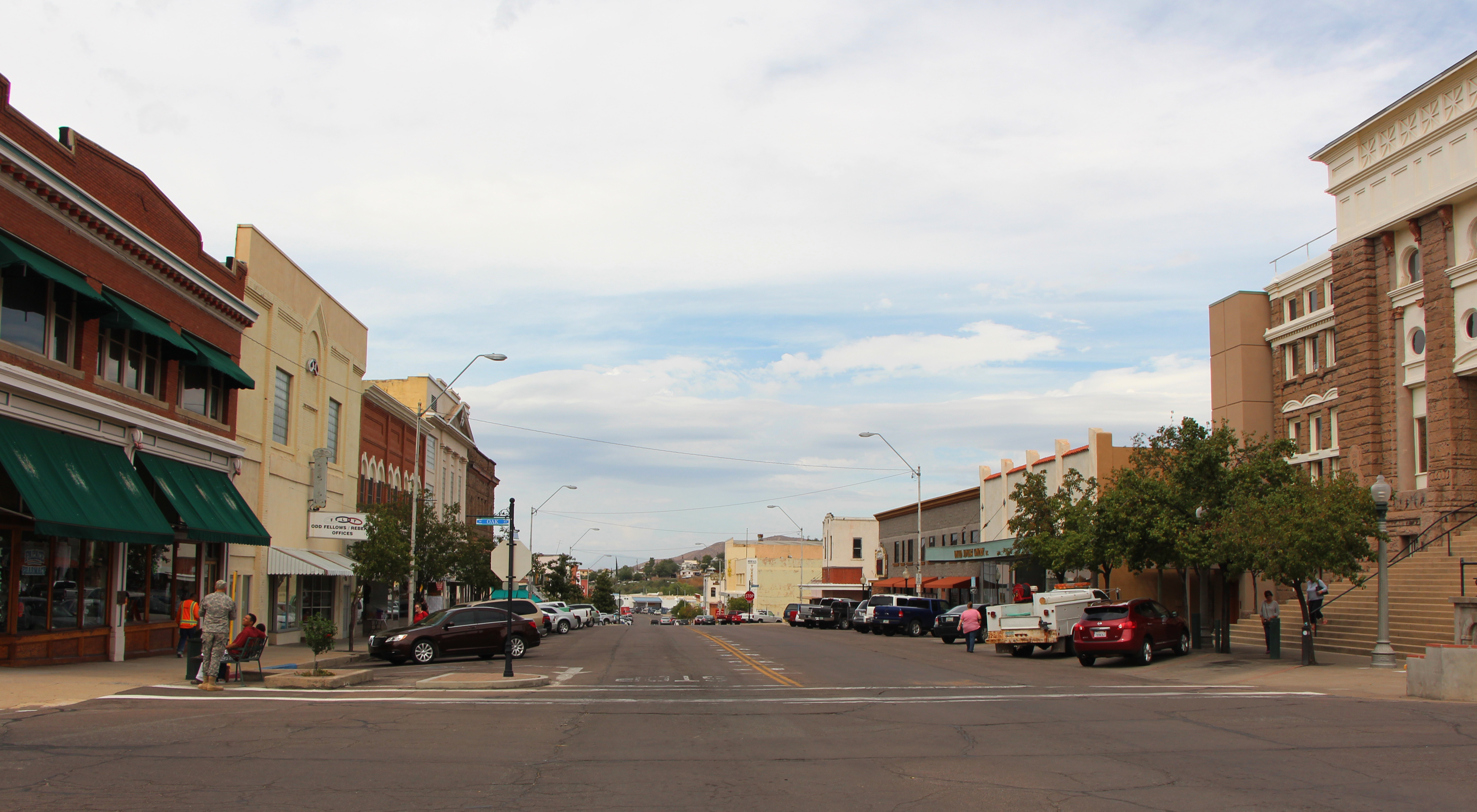

- Location within Arizona Location within the United States
- Location: Broad St. between Cedar and Tebbs, Globe, Arizona
- Area: 13.5 acres (5.5 ha)
- Architect: Lescher & Mahoney, Trost & Trost, William R. Norton
- Architectural style: Late 19th And 20th Century Revivals, Art Deco, Romanesque
- MPS: Globe Commercial and Civic MRA
- NRHP reference No.: 87000862
- Added to NRHP: May 28, 1987

The Globe Downtown Historic District encompasses a group of commercial, religious, and governmental buildings related to the status of Globe as the economic and governmental center of Gila County. Globe was designated as the County Seat of Gila County and grew into the primary economic and commercial center of the Globe mining region. The district also includes three prominent churches and the Globe Post Office and Courthouse, indicative of the area's being the core of civic life in the community. Primary growth of the community occurred between 1880 and 1935, which is considered the period of significance for the district.

Notable buildings in Globe National Historic District
Name	Year Built	Architectural Style	Comments
Gila County Courthouse Gila County Courthouse, Globe, AZ Gila County Courthouse, Detail, Globe, AZ	1906	Italian Renaissance Style	Constructed of locally quarried dacite
Butler Building Butler Building, northwest corner of Mesquite Street and Broad Street, Globe, AZ	1901		Was the First National Bank of Globe in 1905
Elks Building Elks Building, corner of Bailey Street and Mesquite Street	1910	Romanesque style	Has the distinction of being the tallest 3 story building in the United States
Gila Valley Bank and Trust Building Valley National Bank, southwest corner of Mesquite Street and Broad Street, Globe, AZ	1909	Neoclassical	The building is the only Neoclassical structure in Globe. Among the architectural features of the building are Corinthian pilasters, an elaborate frieze, and several semicircular windows
Ardon Hotel/Globe Bakery Ardon Hotel/Globe Bakery, northeast corner of Cedar Street and Broad Street, Globe, AZ	1908	Commercial art deco	Historical use was a bakery with hotel upstairs
Old Dominion Mercantile Old Dominion Mercantile, southwest corner of Oak Street and Broad Street, Globe, AZ	1904		Made of locally quarried dacite stones. Originally housed a bank and department store
Masonic Temple/Hanna Building Masonic Temple/Hanna Building, 192 N. Broad Street	1912	Neoclassical Revival	Houses Masonic Lodge #3, established in 1881. Stores and shops in street level and meeting rooms on upper floors
Amster Building Amster Building, northwest corner of Oak Street and Broad Street	1909	GeorgianRevival	The exterior is complemented by a decorative stepped parapet. Second story cornice supported by dentils while first story cornice is supported by brackets which form capitals on the cast iron pillars
Gila County Jail Gila County Jail, Oak Street, Globe, AZ	1909		The cell blocks were transported from the territorial prison in Yuma, AZ. Building was in continuous use until 1981
St. John's Episcopal Church St. John's Episcopal Church, 185 East Oak Street, Globe, AZ	1908	Gothic revival	Oldest church in Gila County
First Baptist Church First Baptist Church, southeast corner of Hill Street and Oak Street, Globe, AZ	1917	Gothic revival	
United States Post Office and Courthouse United States Post Office and Courthouse, northeast corner of Hill Street and Sycamore Street, Globe, AZ	1926	Beaux-Arts architecture	
Holy Angels Church/Rectory Holy Angels Church and Rectory, southeast corner of Broad Street and Sycamore Street, Globe, AZ	1918		The stained glass windows were designed by Emil Frei Sr., one of America's foremost stained glass artists
Arizona Eastern Railroad Depot Arizona Eastern Railroad Depot, 230 Broad St, Globe, AZ	1916		Contained a restaurant and Wells Fargo Bank
Van Wagenen/Fisk Building Van Wagenen/Fisk Building, 147 Broad Street, Globe, AZ	1905	Original building in Queen Anne style	Originally a residence
Residence Residence, 145 Broad Street, Globe, AZ	1900		
Banks Paint Banks Paint, 143 Broad Street, Globe, AZ	1910	Vernacular	
Federal Building Federal Building, 109 Broad Street, Globe, AZ	1910	Neoclassical Revival	Was a post office from 1910 to 1926

== See also ==
- List of historic properties in Globe, Arizona
