= Black River Bridge (Carrizo, Arizona) =

- U.S. National Register of Historic Places
- Location within Arizona
- Nearest city: Carrizo, Arizona
- Coordinates: 33.71299°N 110.21179°W
- Area: 0.1 acres (0.040 ha)
- Built: 1912, 1929
- Built by: Pittsburg-Des Moines Steel Co.
- Engineer: G.B. Girand
- Architectural style: Deck truss bridge
- MPS: Vehicular Bridges in Arizona MPS
- NRHP reference No.: 88001619
- Added to NRHP: September 30, 1988

The Black River Bridge near Carrizo, Arizona was funded in 1911 and built in 1912. It was listed on the National Register of Historic Places in 1988. It spans the Black River, bringing an army road, now Indian Route 9, over the river from Fort Apache to the railroad at the former town of Rice, Arizona (which is now within San Carlos, Arizona).

Indian Route 9 is one of many Indian routes within Native American reservations in the U.S. The bridge, designated ADOT #3128, is owned by the U.S. Bureau of Indian Affairs. It crosses from the Fort Apache Reservation south into the San Carlos Reservation in Gila County, Arizona.

It is a deck truss bridge which was fabricated by the Pittsburgh-Des Moines Steel Co. It has three Warren truss riveted steel spans, each 82.0 feet (25.0 m) in length, achieving a total length of 273.0 feet (83.2 m). The roadway is a concrete deck that is 18 feet (5.5 m) wide. The bridge has concrete abutments and wingwalls and solid concrete piers. It has a concrete deck over steel stringers.

The original bridge on those piers was designed by Arizona Territorial Engineer G.B. Girand and was completed in 1912 as a timber/iron truss bridge for wagons, employing Howe trusses; the superstructure was replaced by the current steel and concrete system in 1929.

It was deemed significant as one of the earliest public works projects by the Arizona Territorial government, and the only timber bridge that it built.

Further, the 1929-built superstructure "is technologically significant as the oldest of the four multi-span deck trussed trestles" identified in a 1986–87 inventory/study of historic Arizona highway bridges performed for the Arizona Department of Transportation by Clayton Fraser, covering 610 pre-1945 vehicular bridges. According to Fraser, the bridge is "one of the most visually striking spans in Arizona" and "represents an important aspect of the state's bridgebuilding history."

A 2002 photo of the bridge is included in a 2008-updated report on Arizona's historic highway bridges.

== See also ==
- List of bridges on the National Register of Historic Places in Arizona
- National Register of Historic Places listings in Gila County, Arizona
