= Elks' Lodge No. 468 =

- U.S. National Register of Historic Places
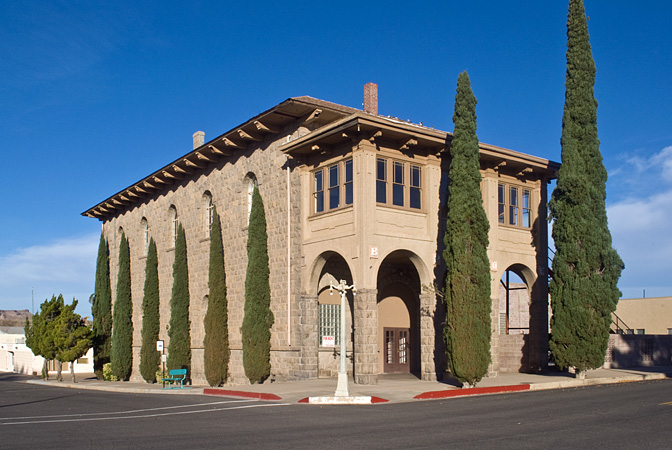

- Location within Arizona Location within the United States
- Location: Fourth and Oak Sts., Kingman, Arizona
- Coordinates: 35°11′27″N 114°3′8″W
- Area: less than one acre
- Built: 1903
- Built by: Hale, Norman
- Architect: Walker, C.E.
- Architectural style: Romanesque, Richardsonian Romanesque
- MPS: Kingman MRA
- NRHP reference No.: 86001138
- Added to NRHP: May 14, 1986

Elks' Lodge No. 468 is a Romanesque-style clubhouse located in Kingman, Arizona. The building is listed on the National Register of Historic Places.

== Description ==
Elks' Lodge No. 468 is located at the Corner of Fourth and Oak Streets in Kingman, Arizona. The building was started in 1903–04 with modifications in 1913. The building is of Romanesque/Richardsonian style. C. E. Walker was the architect and Norman Hale was the contractor. Mr. Hale was an expert stonemason from the 1890s to the early 1900s. The stone was native and came from Metcalfe Quarry. The first fraternal lodge in Kingman, IOOF and Knights of Pythias also used the lodge. The building was added to the National Register of Historic Places in 1986.

== See also ==
- Elks Building (Globe, Arizona)
- National Register of Historic Places listings in Mohave County, Arizona
