= Rice, Arizona =

Ghost town in Gila County, Arizona

Rice, Arizona Ni´té gochii
- Ghost town
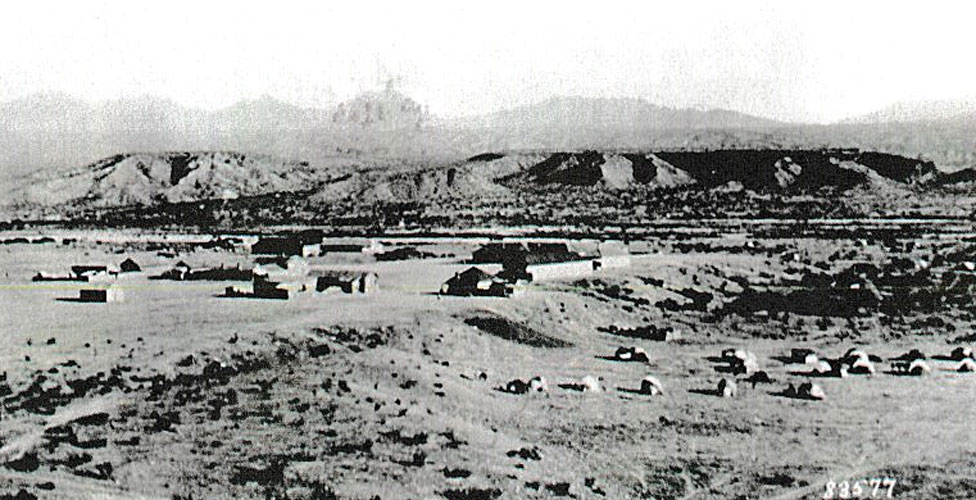
- Rice, Arizona, (Old San Carlos) Apache Indian Agency in 1895
- Nickname: Old San Carlos
- Location within Arizona Location within the United States
- Coordinates: 33°12′35″N 110°25′35″W

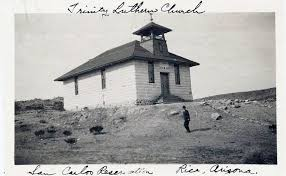
Trinity Lutheran Church, San Carlos Indian Reservation, Rice, Arizona

Rice, Arizona was a populated place in Gila County, Arizona. It became a ghost town, and eventually its area was absorbed into San Carlos, Arizona. It is sometimes referred to as Old San Carlos.

== History ==
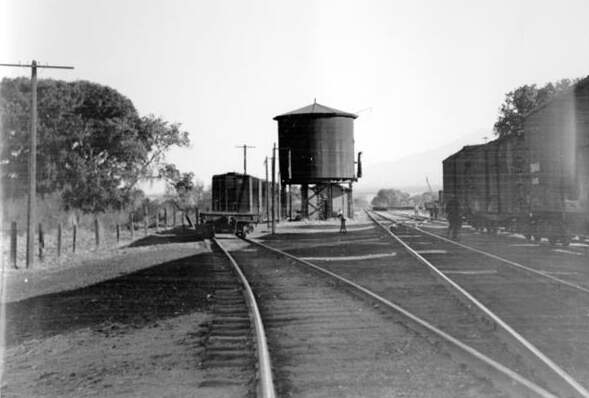
Water tank and railroad cars at Rice, Arizona (San Carlos)

This area was known in the Apache language as Ni´té gochii, or the "Land that extends to the water". The town of Rice was first founded as "Twelve Mile Post"; later, in 1880 it was called "Talklai". The post office was officially named Rice in 1907, although the name Rice had been recorded previously. Eventually it was incorporated into San Carlos, and is sometimes referred to as Old San Carlos.

In 1873, the Aravaipa band of San Carlos Apache peoples were relocated from Camp Grant in the Aravaipa Canyon to the San Carlos Indian Agency along the San Carlos River.

The original location of the agency was abandoned, and was relocated eleven miles upriver to the town of Rice. The Apache families (a total of 645 people) were forced to relocate to the agency at Rice or to the Bylas reservation. Among them was Emanuel Victor, whose Apache name was Béto or Bédo; he was a captive Mexican, known in the Apache dialect as an isnah Naikeyé, and had been captured by San Carlos Apaches as a young boy of around seven. Later as an adult he purchased property along the river, and by 1916 he went to work for the Indian School in Rice. The school house was a 12'x14' wooden building. Years later Victor's family owned about 11% of the cattle in the area, then known as Victor's Bluff.

Beginning in 1900, Lutheran missionaries began working with students at the government-owned boarding school in Rice. They were followed by Roman Catholics who arrived in 1918 to try to convert the students from Lutheranism to Catholicism, although they were successful in converting only 20 of the 270 students. The Lutherans also tried to "bring the gospel" to the Apaches, of which they baptized 52.

In 1919, Pastor Francis Uplegger travelled to Arizona to scope out areas he felt most needed missionary work, deciding upon the Apaches and their lands. That November he set up a temporary living situation in Rice, where he stayed for two years. During his time in Rice, construction on a chapel and personage took place.

The Black River Bridge brought Indian Route 9 from Fort Apache over the Black River to the railway at Rice. The railroad passed through Rice and the San Carlos reservation.

An archive of images and maps of Rice, Arizona (Old San Carlos) is available online.
