= Needle's Eye Wilderness =

Wilderness area in Gila County, Arizona

- IUCN category Ib (wilderness area)
- Location within the United States
- Location: Gila County, Arizona, USA
- Nearest city: Globe, Arizona
- Coordinates: 33°09′08″N 110°36′47″W
- Area: 8,760 acres (35.5 km^{2})
- Established: 1990
- Governing body: U.S. Bureau of Land Management

Needle's Eye Wilderness is an 8,760-acre (35.5 km^{2}) wilderness area located approximately 20 miles (32 km) southeast of the town of Globe in Gila County in the U.S. state of Arizona.

== Topography ==
The Mescal Mountains run northwest across the center of Needle's Eye Wilderness. The southwest flank of the range forms a dip slope of Paleozoic limestone more than 2,500 feet (762.0 m) high. The Gila River forms the Wilderness area's southern boundary as it cuts through the mountains in three narrow, 1,000-foot (304.8 m) deep canyons known as the Needle's Eye. A deep riparian zone covers the narrow river channel, forming the southern boundary of this area. Several small slickrock canyons bisect the Wilderness and connect to the Gila River.

== Access ==
Needle's Eye Wilderness is surrounded by the San Carlos Apache Indian Reservation to the north and south, and private lands to the east and west. Visitors must obtain permission in advance to access the Wilderness.

== See also ==
- List of Arizona Wilderness Areas
- List of U.S. Wilderness Areas
- Wilderness Act
