= Holy Angels Church (Globe, Arizona) =

Historic church in Arizona, United States

- U.S. National Register of Historic Places
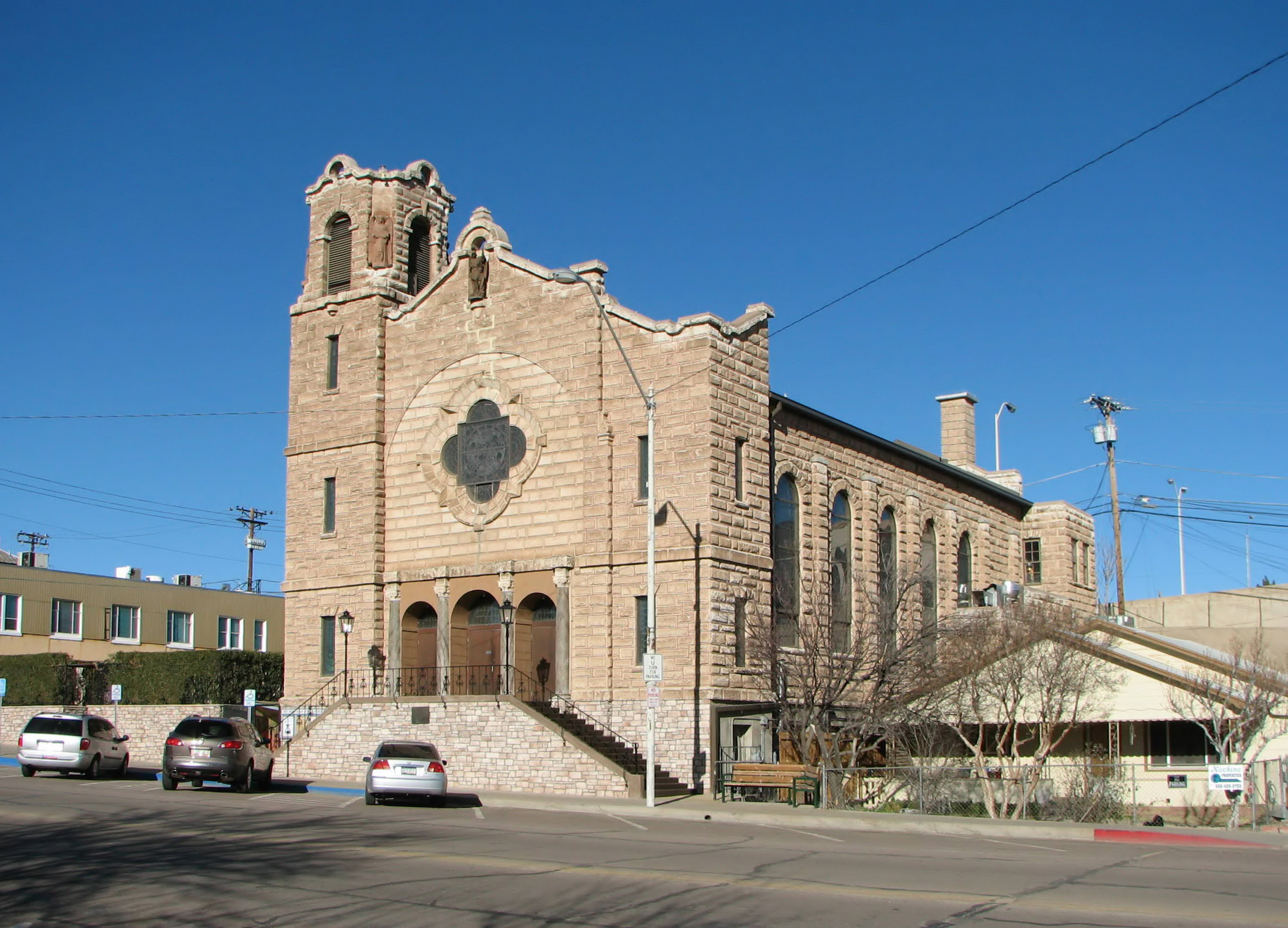

- Location within Arizona Location within the United States
- Location: 231 S. Broad St., Globe, Arizona
- Coordinates: 33°23′41″N 110°47′8″W
- Area: less than one acre
- Built: 1916
- Built by: Virgil Genevrier
- Architect: James S. Pigott
- Architectural style: Romanesque Revival, Mission Revival Influence
- MPS: Globe Commercial and Civic MRA (AD)
- NRHP reference No.: 83003448
- Added to NRHP: December 1, 1983

Holy Angels Church in Globe, Arizona, at 231 S. Broad Street, was built in 1916, and is notable for its architecture and stained glass. It was added to the National Register of Historic Places in 1983.

It is primarily Romanesque Revival in style but with Mission Revival influences. It has numerous stained glass windows created by Emil Frei and Associates. Its "tufa stone walls are remarkable," as is the story of its construction:

A new priest in 1915, Father Virgil Genevrier, "decided that the relatively modest, wood frame and stucco Sacred Heart Church building should be replaced by a new, more inspirational edifice. Father Genevrier had been born and educated in France and, thus, probably recalled the many Romanesque churches'"in his native land when he commissioned James S. Pigott, an^architect from Newark, New Jersey, to design the Holy Angels Church for a vacant portion of the Sacred Heart Church site. (The Sacred Heart Church was demolished, and the rectory was built on the site in 1928.) The construction of the church, which began in 1916, was clearly a community undertaking. Father Genevrier acted as the contractor for the project, probably without the assistance of the distant architect. Furthermore, according to the priest's carefully detailed parish account book, most of the craftsmen who cut the tufa stones and erected the building were members."

It is 96 by 46 feet (29 m × 14 m) in plan, is built upon a reinforced concrete foundation, and has a four-story bell tower. The belfry has three bells weighing 500 pounds (230 kg), 300 pounds (140 kg), and 200 pounds (91 kg) cast in 1918 by the McShane Bell Foundry of Baltimore. As of 1983 the bells were no longer being used due to poor condition of their cradles.

"Adjacent to the church is the Holy Angels Rectory, built in 1928 in the Romanesque Revival style with Spanish Colonial Revival overtones; it was substantially modified in 1952 to assume a Pueblo Revival image. The church exhibits good integrity, as it is essentially unaltered."

"The stained glass windows of the Holy Angels Church are particularly noteworthy. These splendid windows render a memorable quality to the light which they admit into the building and create an atmosphere uncommon to other frontier-era churches in the Southwest. These windows were designed and executed by Emil Frei, one of the most influential stained glass artists in the United States during the early decades of the twentieth century. (It is necessary to note that the designer of the Holy Angels Church windows was Emil Frei, Senior, founder of the Emil Frei Studios of St. Louis. His son, Emil Frei Junior, continued his father's work and gained a level of prominence even greater than his father. The son discontinued the use of "Junior" after his father's death. Unless one is knowledgeable of the fact that there were two Emil Freis, the extensive literature on the Freis can become confusing. Further confounding the matter, father and son collaborated on a number of works. However, the work of the son, especially that executed in the 1940s and later, is readily identified by its modern, cubistic character.)"

It also has an organ manufactured by the Wicks Organ Company of Highland, Illinois.

== See also ==
- National Register of Historic Places listings in Gila County, Arizona
