= Besh-Ba-Gowah =

Archaeological site in Arizona, United States

Coordinates: 33°22′54″N 110°46′22″W

- U.S. National Register of Historic Places
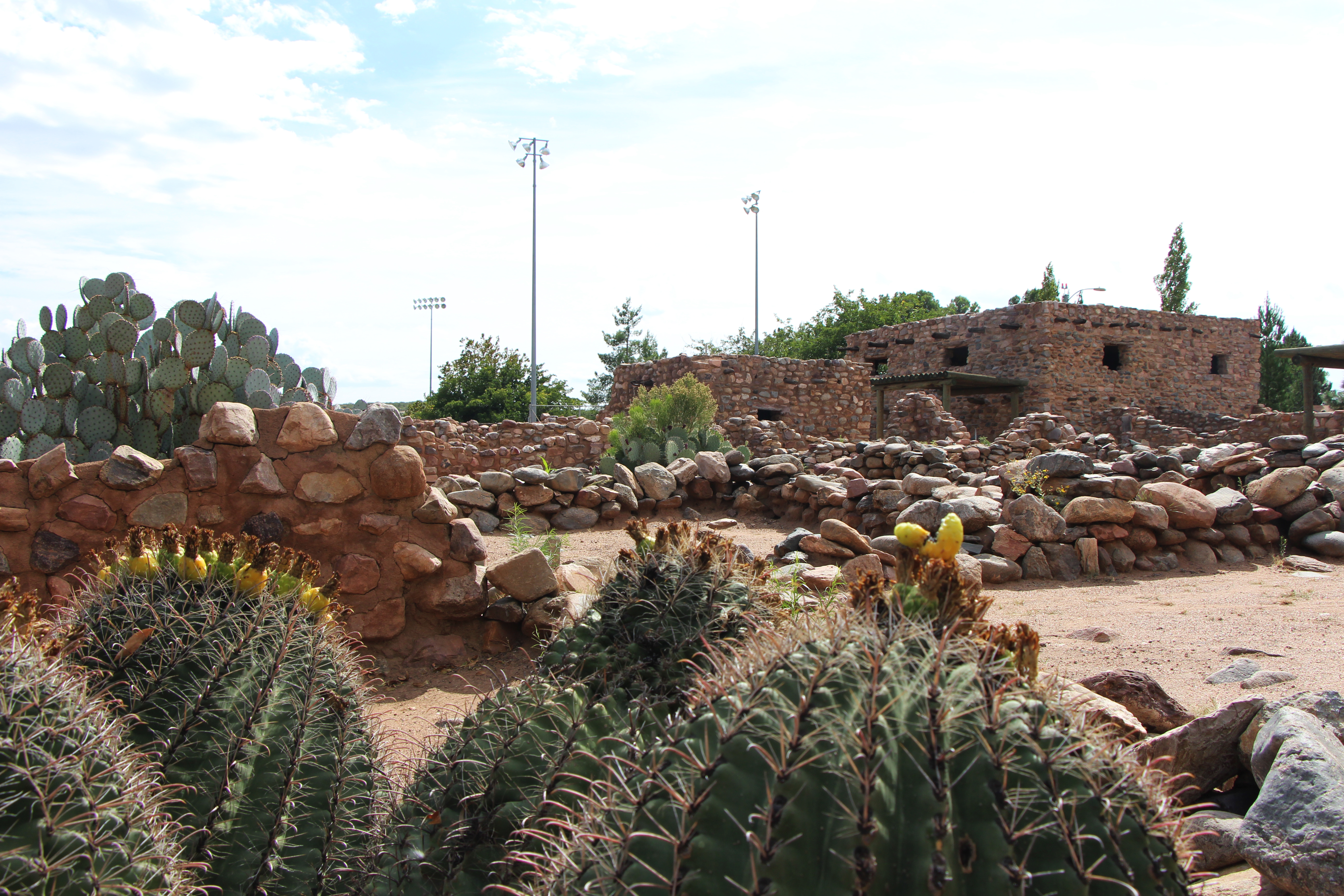
- Besh-Ba-Gowah, Facing southeast towards central plaza

- Location within Arizona Location within the United States
- Nearest city: Globe, Arizona
- Area: 2.5 acres (1.0 ha)
- NRHP reference No.: 84000648
- Added to NRHP: May 9, 1984

Besh-Ba-Gowah is a 200-room prehistoric Salado masonry pueblo located atop a broad ridge overlooking Pinal Creek. The site is situated one mile southwest from Globe, Arizona and surrounded by a small city park and adjacent museum with excavated items including prehistoric pottery, stone and woven artifacts. The site is operated by the city as Besh Ba Gowah Archaeological Park and Museum.

Besh-Ba-Gowah was occupied by Salado populations between AD 1225 and AD 1400. "Salado" is the term applied to the complex of cultural attributes of the prehistoric peoples who inhabited the Globe/Miami and Tonto Basin regions between AD 1150 and AD 1450.

Besh-Ba-Gowah architecture consists of multi-storied, masonry room block clusters connected by long, narrow corridors or elongated plazas. These room blocks and corridors are situated around a large communal plaza area measuring 12 meters north–south by 27 meters east/west.

Material recovered from Besh-Ba-Gowah has formed the foundation for the profession's current understanding and definition of the Salado culture concept. Thus, Besh-Ba-Gowah is considered one of the Salado culture "type sites".

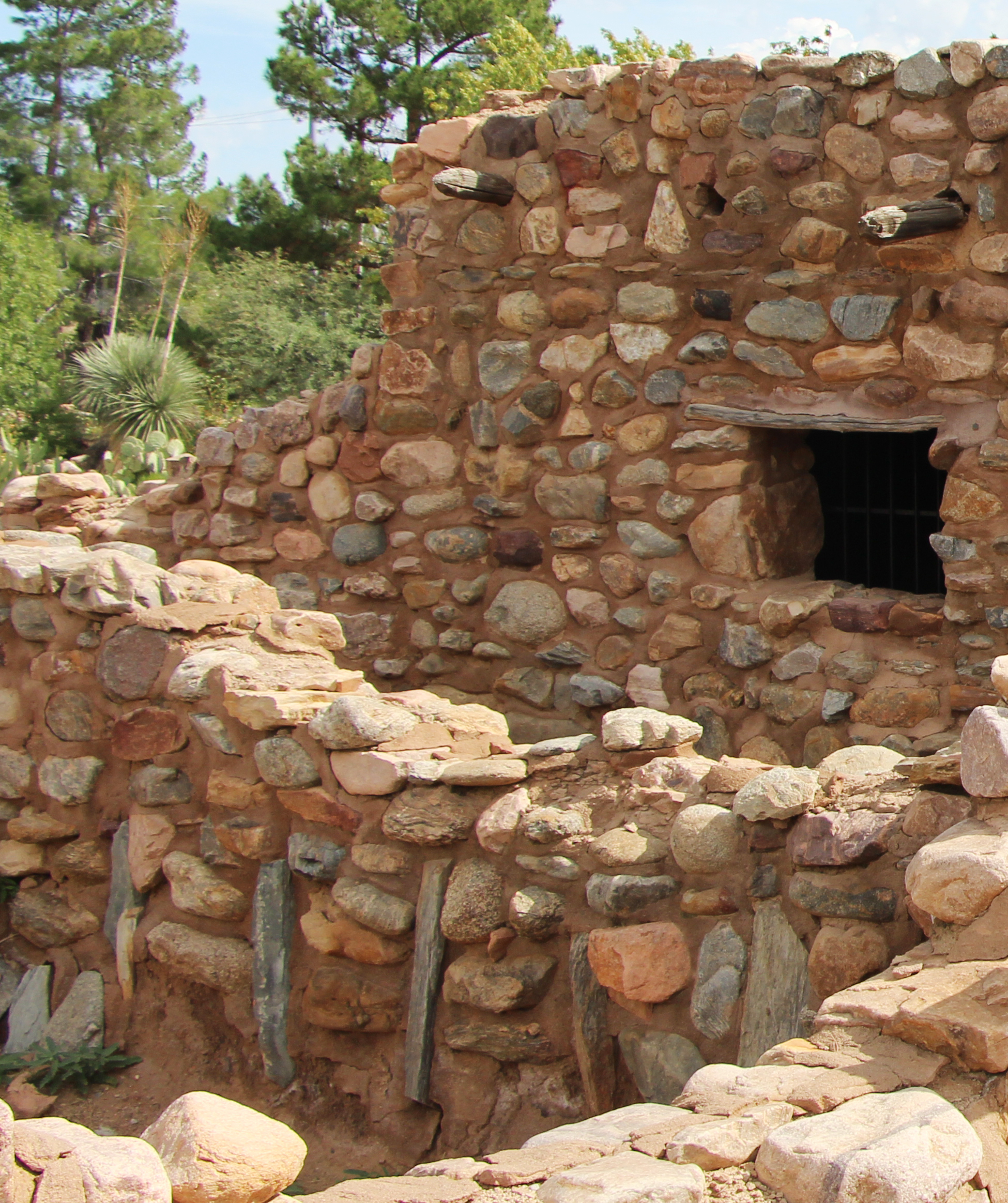
Besh-Ba-Gowah, showing vertical stones at base of wall, Globe, AZ

All walled architecture at Besh-Ba-Gowah consists of unshaped, large to moderate-sized, granite cobble masonry laid with a clay mortar. Evidence suggests interior room walls were commonly plastered with this mortar or a more calcareous mixture resulting in white-colored finished walls. There are some indications that at least selected exterior wall surfaces were also plastered with the original clay mortar. Often the basal masonry course consisted of upright vertical slabs, presently considered characteristic of Salado masonry architecture.

Excavations at the Besh-Ba-Gowah site were funded originally by the Federal Emergency Relief Administration and then by the Works Projects Administration. The "ruin represents one of the few remaining, reconstructed and stabilized examples of archaeological projects undertaken within Arizona to alleviate critical unemployment during the Depression.

The site was listed on the National Register of Historic Places in 1984.

== Gallery ==
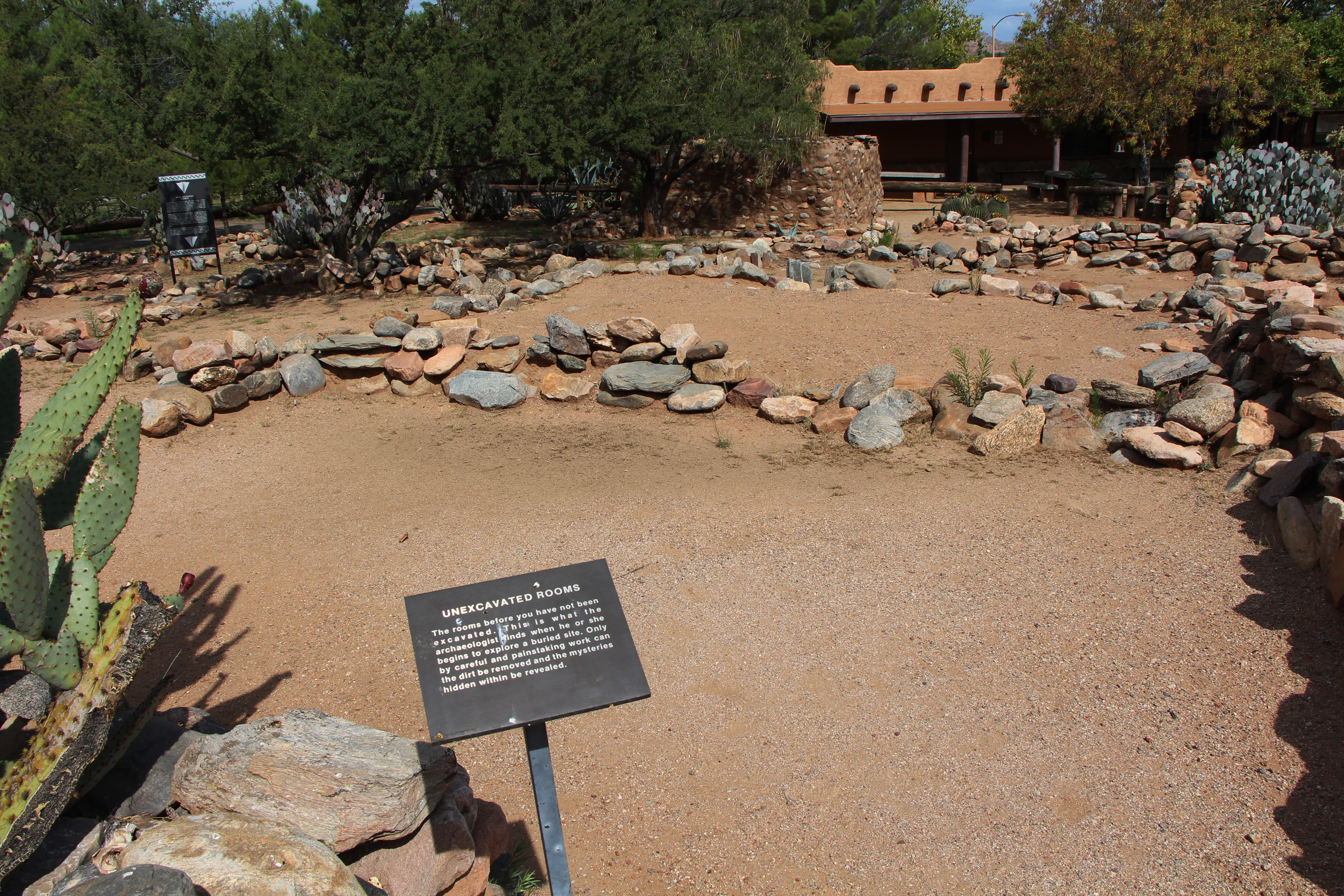
Besh-Ba-Gowah, unexcavated rooms, Globe, AZ

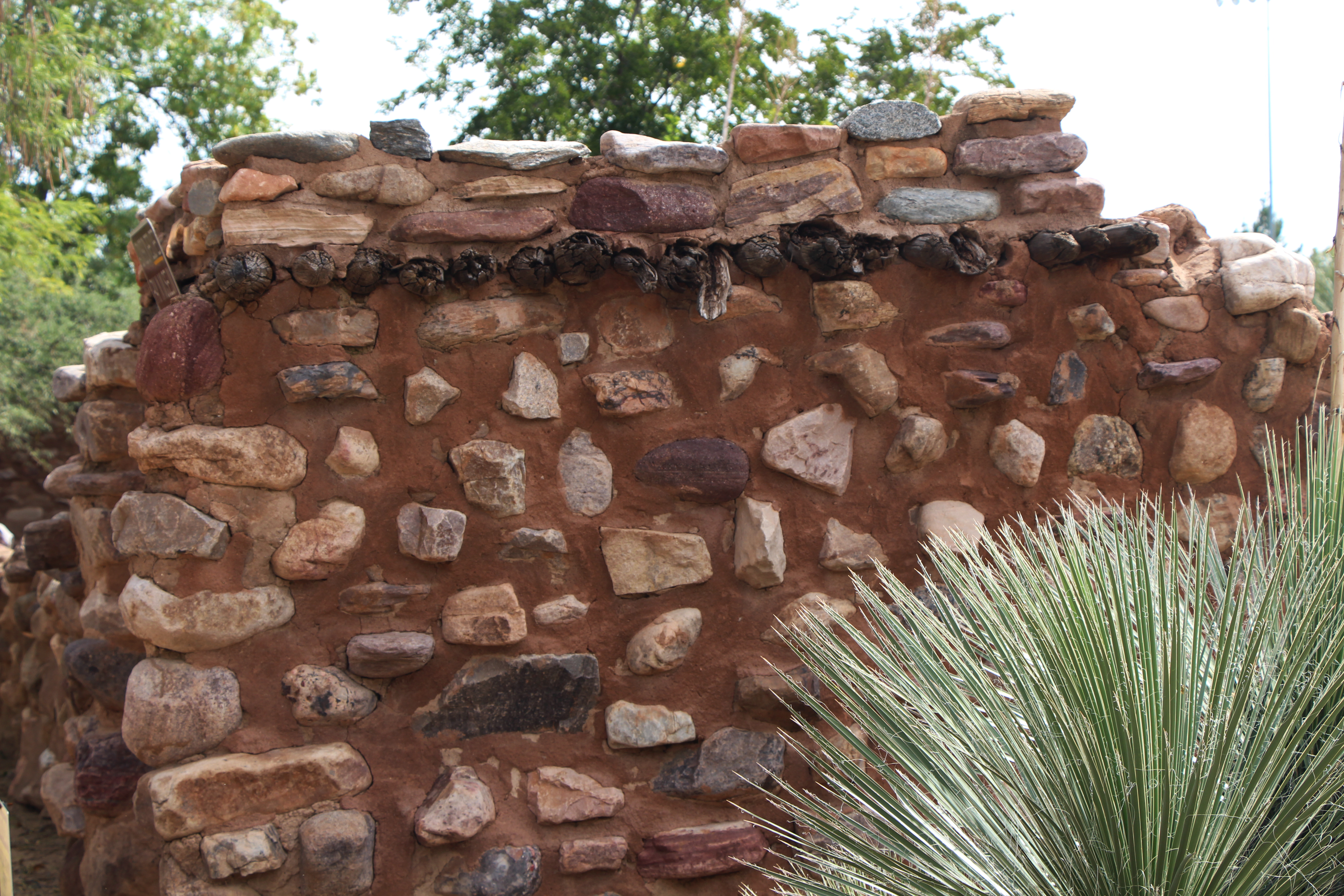
Besh-Ba-Gowah, roof detail, Globe, AZ

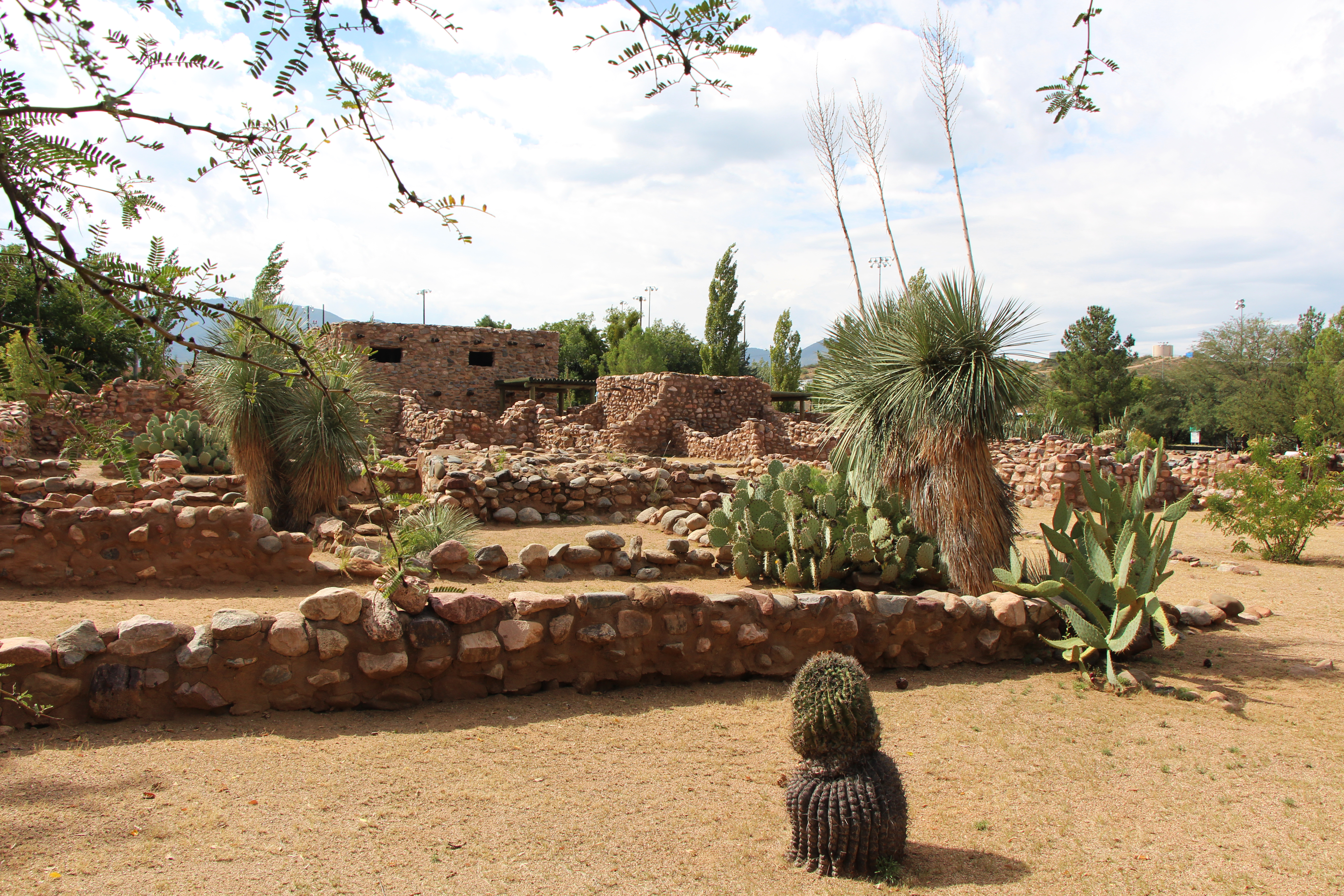
Besh-Ba-Gowah, modern day, looking south west, Globe, AZ

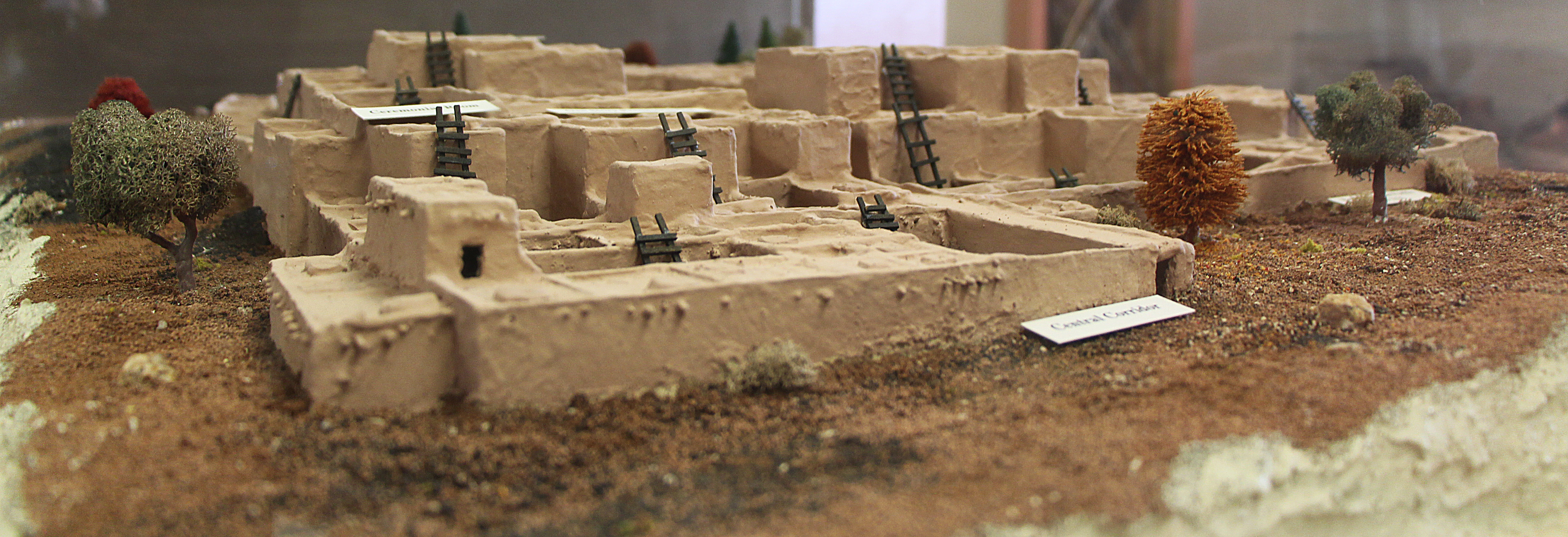
Besh-Ba-Gowah diorama, looking south west, GlobeAZ

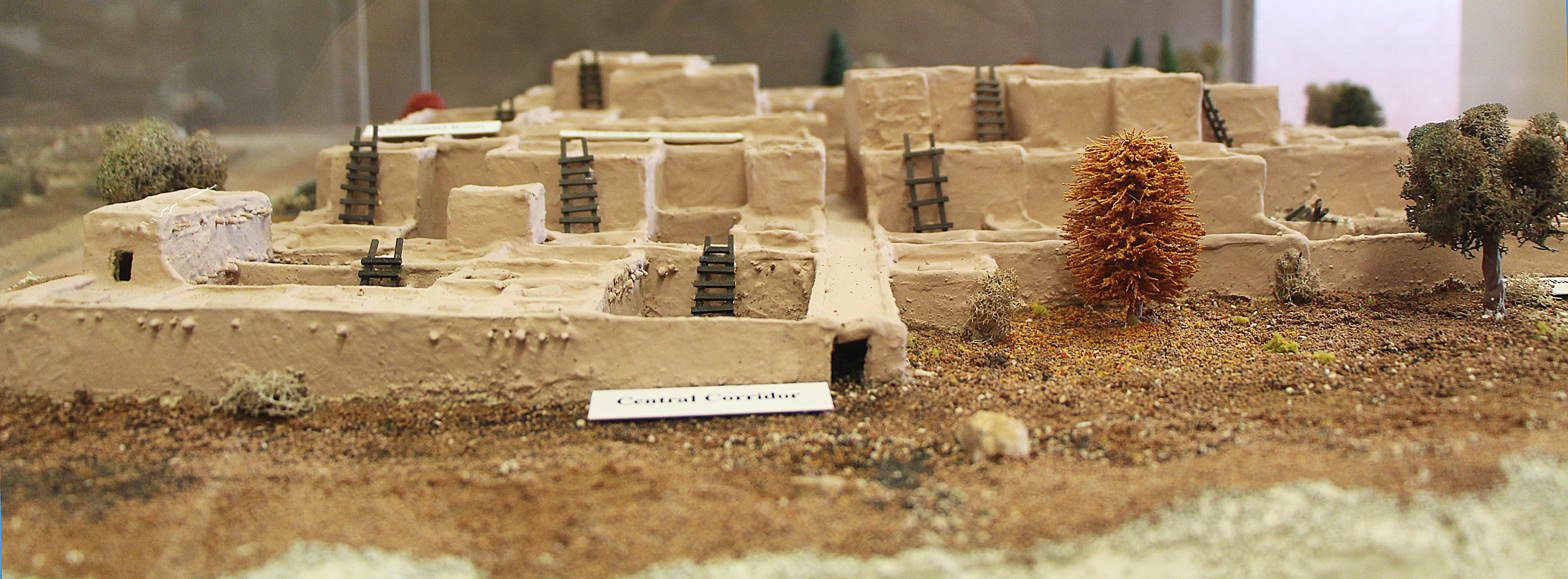
Besh-Ba-Gowah, diorama looking south down central corridor, Globe, AZ

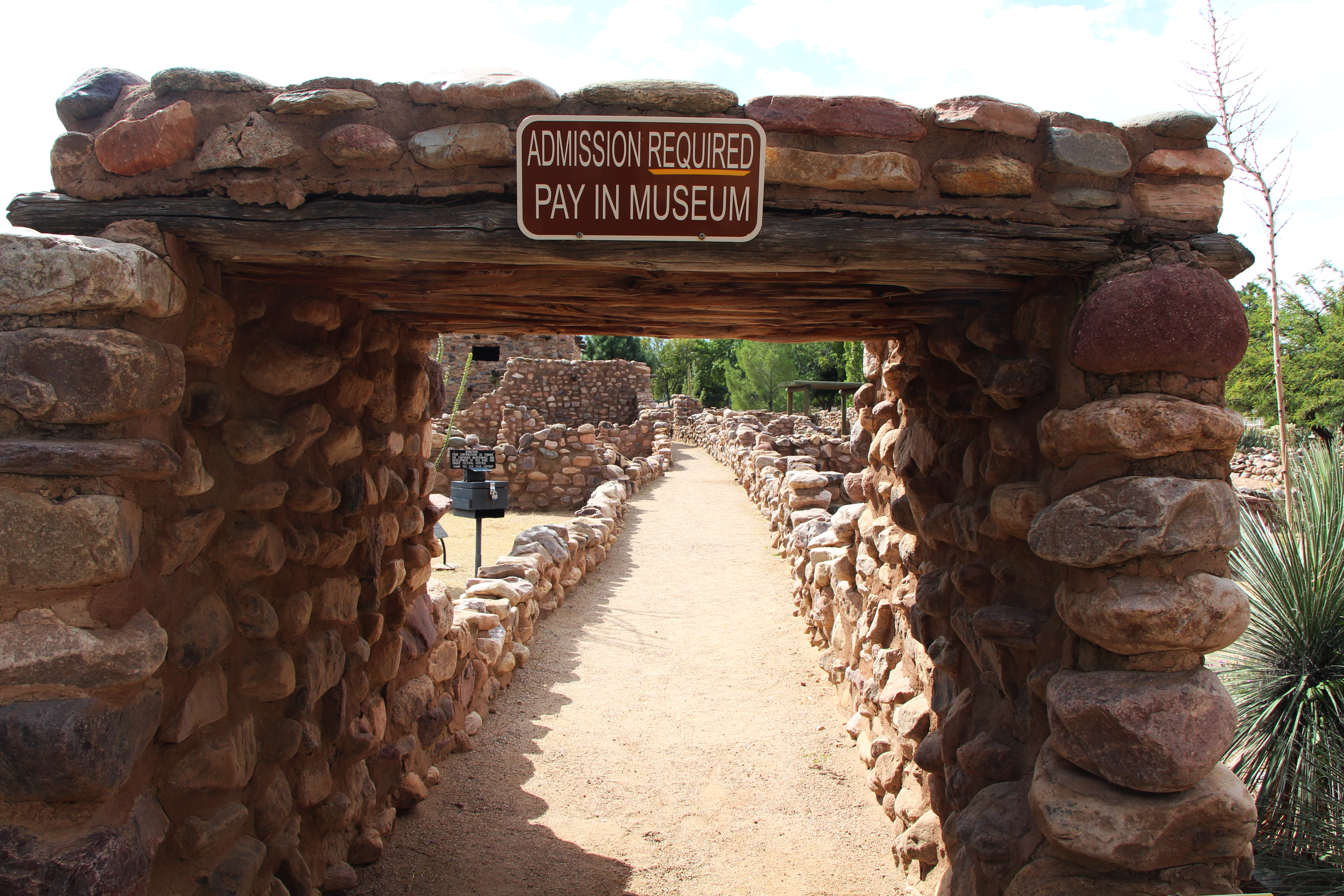
Besh-Ba-Gowah, looking south down main corridor, Globe, AZ
