= Carrizo, Arizona =

CDP in Gila County, Arizona

- Census-designated place
- Location of Carrizo in Gila County, Arizona.

- Location within Arizona Location within the United States
- Coordinates: 33°59′38″N 110°17′19″W
- Country: United States
- State: Arizona
- County: Gila

Area
  - Total: 9.05 sq mi (23.44 km^{2})
  - Land: 9.03 sq mi (23.39 km^{2})
  - Water: 0.023 sq mi (0.06 km^{2})
- Elevation: 4,918 ft (1,499 m)

Population (2020)
  - Total: 92
  - Density: 10.2/sq mi (3.93/km^{2})
- Time zone: UTC-7 (Mountain (MST))
- ZIP code: 85542
- Area code: 928
- GNIS feature ID: 2481

Carrizo (Western Apache: Gaadisóh) is a census-designated place in Gila County, Arizona, United States, located on the Fort Apache Indian Reservation.

The community's name is Spanish for "reeds" and is likely derived from the Carrizo band of Apache.

== History ==
It was the location of, or the nearest community to, the Black River Bridge (Carrizo, Arizona), which is listed on the National Register of Historic Places.

Carrizo's population was 25 in the 1960 census.

== Demographics ==
Historical population
Census	Pop.	Note	%±
1960	25		—
2020	92		—
U.S. Decennial Census

As of the 2010 Census, its population was 127, of which 125 were Native American.

== Transportation ==
The White Mountain Apache Tribe operates the Fort Apache Connection Transit, which provides local bus service.
