= Globe, Arizona =

City in Arizona, United States

Globe
- City
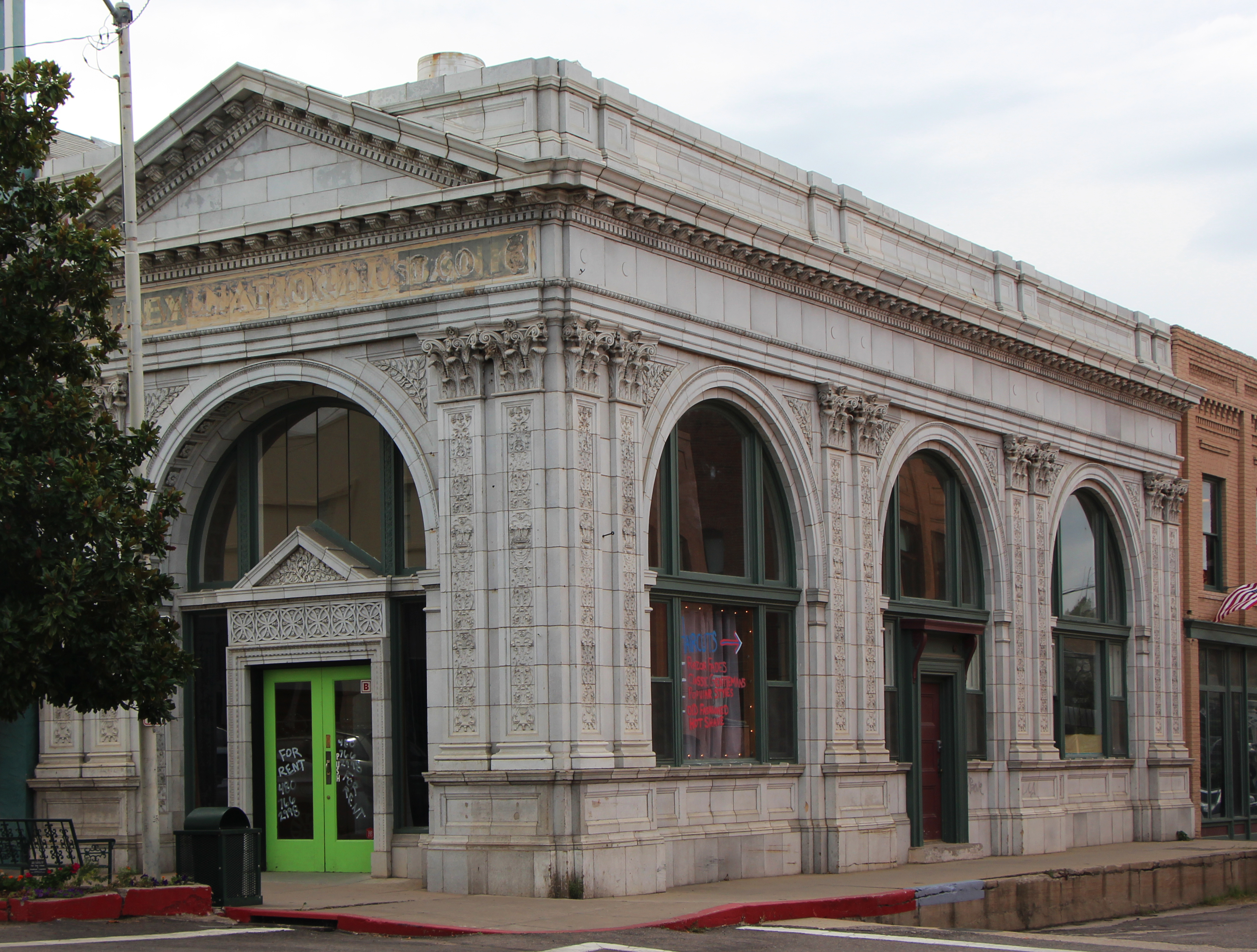
- Gila Valley Bank and Trust Building, built in 1909

- Flag Logo
- Motto: "City of Hospitality"
- Location of Globe in Gila County, Arizona

- Location in Arizona Location in United States Location in North America
- Coordinates: 33°23′59″N 110°46′54″W
- Country: United States
- State: Arizona
- County: Gila
- Founded: c. 1875
- Incorporated: 1907

Government
  - Mayor: Al Gameros

Area
  - Total: 18.21 sq mi (47.17 km^{2})
  - Land: 18.20 sq mi (47.14 km^{2})
  - Water: 0.012 sq mi (0.03 km^{2})
- Elevation: 3,510 ft (1,070 m)

Population (2020)
  - Total: 7,249
  - Density: 398.3/sq mi (153.77/km^{2})
- Time zone: UTC-7 (MST (no DST))
- ZIP codes: 85501-85502
- Area code: 928
- FIPS code: 04-28030
- GNIS feature ID: 29342
- Website: www.globeaz.gov

Globe (Western Apache: Bésh Baa Gowąh "Place of Metal") is a town in and the county seat of Gila County, Arizona, United States. As of the 2020 census, the population of the city was 7,249. Globe was founded c. 1875 as a mining camp. Mining, tourism, government and retirees are most important in the present-day Globe economy.

The Globe Downtown Historic District was added to the National Register of Historic Places in 1987.

== Geography ==
Globe is in southern Gila County at 33°23′59″N 110°46′54″W (33.399858, −110.781570), in the valley of Pinal Creek, a north-flowing tributary of the Salt River. U.S. Route 60 passes through the city, leading northeast through the Fort Apache Indian Reservation 87 miles (140 km) to Show Low, and west 87 miles (140 km) to Phoenix. The western terminus of U.S. Route 70 is in Globe at US 60 on the east side of town; US 70 leads southeast through the San Carlos Apache Indian Reservation 77 miles (124 km) to Safford and 2,385 miles (3,838 km) to its eastern terminus at Atlantic, North Carolina. Arizona State Route 77 leads south from Globe 36 miles (58 km) to Winkelman, and Roosevelt is 31 miles (50 km) to the northwest via State Route 188, which also provides a route to Payson, located along State Route 87.

According to the United States Census Bureau, the city of Globe has a total area of 18.2 square miles (47.1 km^{2}), of which 0.01 square miles (0.03 km^{2}), or 0.07%, is water. The town of Miami is 6 miles (10 km) west of Globe's downtown. Globe, Miami, and the unincorporated areas nearby (including Inspiration, Claypool and Central Heights-Midland City) are commonly called "Globe-Miami".

== Transportation ==
Globe is served by the Arizona Eastern Railway. In December 2008, weekend excursion service under the name Copper Spike began operating from Globe to the Apache Gold Hotel Casino near San Carlos. Trains operated four daily round-trips on Thursdays through Sundays (autumn through spring) until 2011, when the Copper Spike Excursions were discontinued.

The San Carlos Apache Airport is a public-use general aviation airport located seven nautical miles (8.1 miles; 13 km) southeast of the city's central business district.

The Town of Miami operates the Cobre Valley Community Transit, which provides local bus service in Miami and Globe. San Carlos Apache Nnee Bich'o Nii Transit provides transportation from Globe to the San Carlos Apache Indian Reservation and Safford. Greyhound Lines serves Globe on its Phoenix–El Paso via Globe route via a stop in Miami.

== Climate ==
Globe has a semi-arid climate, characterized by hot summers and moderate to warm winters. Globe's arid climate is somewhat tempered by its elevation, however, leading to slightly cooler temperatures and slightly more precipitation than Phoenix or Yuma.

Summers in Globe are hot, with daytime highs generally between 90 and 100 °F (32 and 38 °C). High temperatures topping 100 °F (38 °C) are not uncommon in July and August for Globe. Summertime lows are generally right around 65 °F (18 °C).

Wintertime highs usually average between 55 and 65 °F (13 and 18 °C), and lows tend to be right at or above freezing (32 °F/0 °C).

The all-time highest recorded temperature in Globe is 111 °F (44 °C), occurring on both June 27, 1990, and July 29, 1995. The lowest recorded temperature in the city is 12 °F (−11 °C), which occurred the same year the first time the record high was reached—December 23, 1990.

Climate data for Globe, Arizona, 1991–2020 normals, extremes 2009–present
Month	Jan	Feb	Mar	Apr	May	Jun	Jul	Aug	Sep	Oct	Nov	Dec	Year
Record high °F (°C)	72 (22)	82 (28)	87 (31)	96 (36)	101 (38)	112 (44)	109 (43)	110 (43)	103 (39)	96 (36)	84 (29)	72 (22)	112 (44)
Mean daily maximum °F (°C)	55.3 (12.9)	59.4 (15.2)	67.7 (19.8)	76.1 (24.5)	85.2 (29.6)	96.5 (35.8)	96.8 (36.0)	95.3 (35.2)	90.1 (32.3)	79.2 (26.2)	65.2 (18.4)	55.9 (13.3)	76.9 (24.9)
Daily mean °F (°C)	44.1 (6.7)	47.8 (8.8)	54.3 (12.4)	61.8 (16.6)	70.0 (21.1)	80.5 (26.9)	83.7 (28.7)	82.1 (27.8)	76.6 (24.8)	65.5 (18.6)	53.1 (11.7)	44.3 (6.8)	63.7 (17.6)
Mean daily minimum °F (°C)	32.9 (0.5)	36.3 (2.4)	40.9 (4.9)	47.4 (8.6)	54.7 (12.6)	64.5 (18.1)	70.6 (21.4)	68.9 (20.5)	63.1 (17.3)	51.8 (11.0)	41.0 (5.0)	32.7 (0.4)	50.4 (10.2)
Record low °F (°C)	17 (−8)	9 (−13)	27 (−3)	27 (−3)	37 (3)	47 (8)	51 (11)	59 (15)	46 (8)	26 (−3)	22 (−6)	19 (−7)	9 (−13)
Average precipitation inches (mm)	2.05 (52)	1.90 (48)	1.04 (26)	0.44 (11)	0.35 (8.9)	0.26 (6.6)	2.71 (69)	2.08 (53)	1.01 (26)	1.22 (31)	1.05 (27)	1.51 (38)	15.62 (396.5)
Average precipitation days (≥ 0.01 in)	4.8	4.6	3.8	2.2	2.5	1.8	9.8	9.6	6.0	3.9	3.7	5.7	58.4
Source 1: NOAA
Source 2: National Weather Service

== Demographics ==
Historical population
Census	Pop.	Note	%±
1880	704		—
1890	803		14.1%
1900	1,495		86.2%
1910	7,083		373.8%
1920	7,044		−0.6%
1930	7,157		1.6%
1940	6,141		−14.2%
1950	6,419		4.5%
1960	6,217		−3.1%
1970	7,333		18.0%
1980	6,708		−8.5%
1990	6,062		−9.6%
2000	7,486		23.5%
2010	7,532		0.6%
2020	7,249		−3.8%
U.S. Decennial Census

=== Racial and ethnic composition ===
Racial Makeup
Race (NH = Non-Hispanic)	% 2020	% 2010	% 2000	Pop. 2020	Pop. 2010	Pop. 2000
White Alone (NH)	47.8%	55.3%	61.5%	3,466	4,163	4,606
Black Alone (NH)	0.7%	0.7%	1.1%	49	53	80
American Indian Alone (NH)	10.8%	5%	2.6%	783	377	194
Asian Alone (NH)	2.1%	1%	1%	149	78	77
Pacific Islander Alone (NH)	0.1%	0%	0%	4	2	3
Other Race Alone (NH)	0.5%	0.1%	0%	36	6	3
Multiracial (NH)	3%	1%	1%	221	78	74
Hispanic (Any race)	35.1%	36.8%	32.7%	2,541	2,775	2,449

=== 2020 census ===
As of the 2020 census, Globe had a population of 7,249. The median age was 41.4 years. 21.5% of residents were under the age of 18 and 21.6% of residents were 65 years of age or older. For every 100 females there were 101.5 males, and for every 100 females age 18 and over there were 99.8 males age 18 and over.

84.2% of residents lived in urban areas, while 15.8% lived in rural areas.

There were 2,758 households in Globe, of which 29.8% had children under the age of 18 living in them. Of all households, 41.0% were married-couple households, 21.0% were households with a male householder and no spouse or partner present, and 29.6% were households with a female householder and no spouse or partner present. About 29.7% of all households were made up of individuals and 14.9% had someone living alone who was 65 years of age or older.

There were 3,305 housing units, of which 16.6% were vacant. The homeowner vacancy rate was 2.6% and the rental vacancy rate was 14.2%.

=== 2000 census ===
As of the census of 2000, there were 7,486 people, 2,814 households, and 1,871 families residing in the city. The population density was 415.5 inhabitants per square mile (160.4/km^{2}). There were 3,172 housing units at an average density of 176.0 units per square mile (68.0 units/km^{2}). The racial makeup of the city was 77.6% White, 1.2% Black or African American, 3.1% Native American, 1.1% Asian, <0.1% Pacific Islander, 14.6% from other races, and 2.4% from two or more races. 32.7% of the population were Hispanic or Latino of any race.

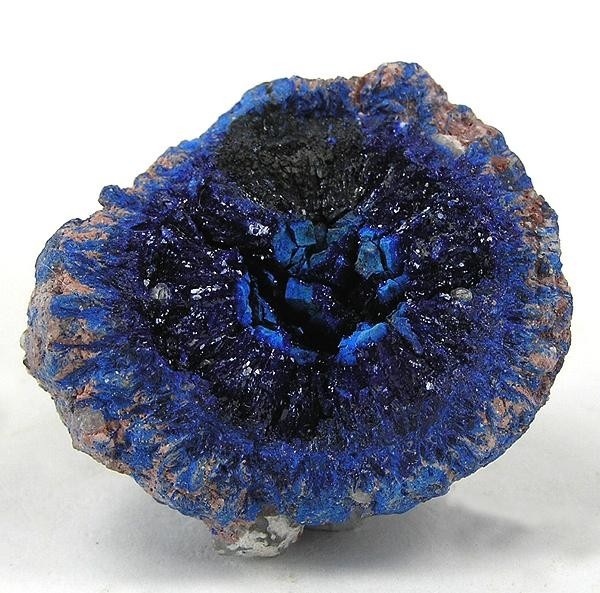
Unusual azurite specimen from the Blue Ball mine near Globe. About 1.5 inches (3.8 cm) wide.

There were 2,814 households, out of which 30.8% had children under the age of 18 living with them, 49.3% were married couples living together, 12.7% had a female householder with no husband present, and 33.5% were non-families. 30.1% of all households were made up of individuals, and 13.1% had someone living alone who was 65 years of age or older. The average household size was 2.49 and the average family size was 3.09.

In the city, the population was spread out, with 25.8% under the age of 18, 7.6% from 18 to 24, 26.5% from 25 to 44, 24.4% from 45 to 64, and 15.6% who were 65 years of age or older. The median age was 38 years. For every 100 females, there were 101.6 males. For every 100 females age 18 and over, there were 100.1 males.

The median income for a household in the city was $33,071, and the median income for a family was $42,280. Males had a median income of $31,404 versus $21,952 for females. The per capita income for the city was $16,128. About 8.8% of families and 11.4% of the population were below the poverty line, including 14.8% of those under age 18 and 8.4% of those age 65 or over.

== Economy ==
In 1875, prospectors found silver in the San Carlos Apache Reservation, including an unusual globe-shaped silver nugget. In just four years, the silver began to give out, but by then copper deposits were discovered. In the 1900s, the Old Dominion Copper Company in Globe ranked as one of the world's richest. The Old Dominion closed in 1931, and mining operations moved to nearby Miami.

Globe's economy remains heavily dependent on the service industry, and the mining industry, and as of 2008 the city was home to one of the few operating copper smelters in the United States.

Major employers in Globe include Gila County, Arizona State Prison Complex – Florence, Heritage Health Care Center, Globe Unified School District, and Gila Community College.

== History ==
Besh-Ba-Gowah, about one mile south of Globe, was occupied by Salado populations between AD 1225 and AD 1400.

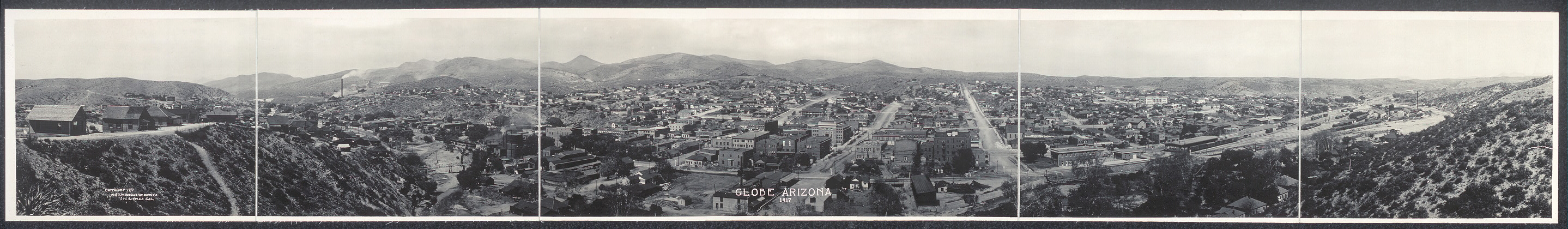
Globe, Arizona panorama, 1917

In 1875 silver was discovered in the San Carlos Apache Indian Reservation. Accordingly, that same year, the mining camp at Ramboz Peak nearest to the reservation relocated to what became Globe. The plans for an incorporated Globe were established in July 1876, with retail stores, banks, and Globe's first newspaper printing its first issue on May 2, 1878. By February 1881, Globe was the Gila County seat. Coming with Globe's new importance as the county seat came a stagecoach line linking it to Silver City, New Mexico.

Due to Globe's relative isolation from the rest of Arizona and its proximity to the San Carlos Apache reservation, Globe remained a frontier town. Globe's history is laced with many historic events such as murders, stagecoach robberies, outlaws, lynchings, and Apache raids. Natiotish, a San Carlos Apache, left the reservation with a group of about 50 men and continued to attack ranchers and miners.

In 1884 the surviving Clanton brothers Ike and Phineas arrived in Apache County after the infamous gunfight at the OK Corral in Tombstone. Ike was eventually killed by a local deputy sheriff, and Phineas, after serving prison time for a stage robbery, moved to Globe, where he died of pneumonia and was buried in 1906.

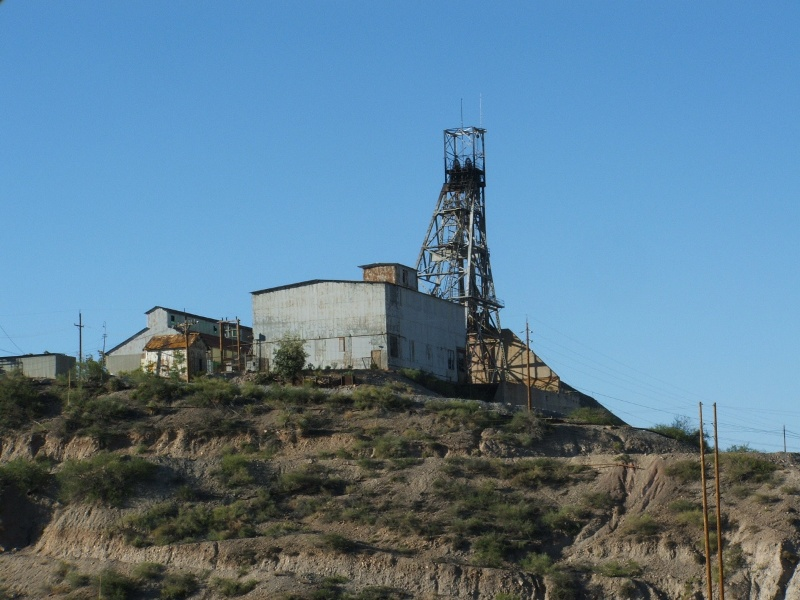
The Old Dominion mine was the principal copper producer in the Globe District. In retirement, the old mine workings serve as the water supply for Globe-Miami and the district mines. Photo courtesy Jerry Willis.

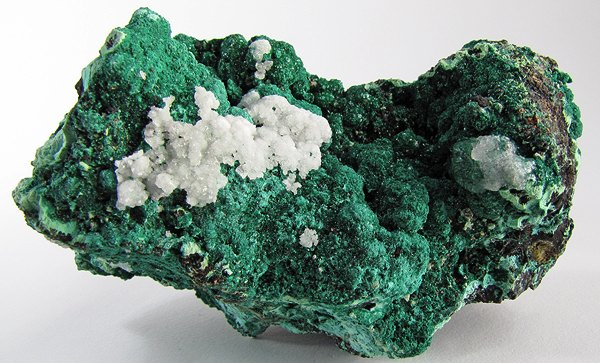
Specimen of malachite from the Old Dominion mine

Globe is also known for having links to Geronimo and the Apache Kid. On October 23, 1889, the Apache Kid's trial was held in the Globe Courthouse. After he was convicted, it was the responsibility of Sheriff Glenn Reynolds to transport him to the Arizona Territorial Prison in Yuma. Sheriff Reynolds, his deputy, and their prisoners set out in an armored stagecoach holding the Apache Kid inside. At an incline in the road, known as the Kelvin Grade Massacre, near present-day Kearny, Sheriff Reynolds let some of the prisoners out of the stagecoach seeing as they were on an uphill climb and he wanted to ease the burden on the horses. The prisoners were able to overcome and murder Sheriff Reynolds as well as one other man. A third was left for dead. In response, the United States Army launched a campaign to track down the renegades.

=== Old Dominion copper mine ===
The Old Dominion Mining Company was incorporated in 1880, and ran "on a financial roller-coaster" for the next twenty years. In 1894, the mine was sold to the Lewisohn Brothers of New York. The arrival of the railroad in 1898 dramatically lowered shipping costs. In 1904, the mine was acquired by Phelps-Dodge, who appointed Louis D. Ricketts as general manager. From 1904 to 1908, Phelps-Dodge spent $2.5 million on expanding and modernizing the mine and plant. As the mine grew, so did Globe. World War 1 brought increased copper demand; the mine and town both prospered. 1917 was a year of labor unrest in the copper mines nationwide. A strike on the Globe mines was called on July 1, 1917. Federal troops were called in to restore order, miners began returning to work, and the mine was back to normal production by October.

In the postwar years, the Old Dominion never returned to its former glory. Neglected maintenance, declining ore grades, and flooding underground all took their toll. The mine closed during the recession of 1921–22, and the mine closed permanently in 1931. In its half-century of operation, the mine produce some 800 million pounds of copper, and returned gross earnings of $134 million to shareholders. It was the economic mainstay for the Globe community for most of this half-century.

The property was sold to the Miami Copper Company as a water supply in 1941, and continues to supply both industrial and domestic water to the area.

=== Historic buildings ===
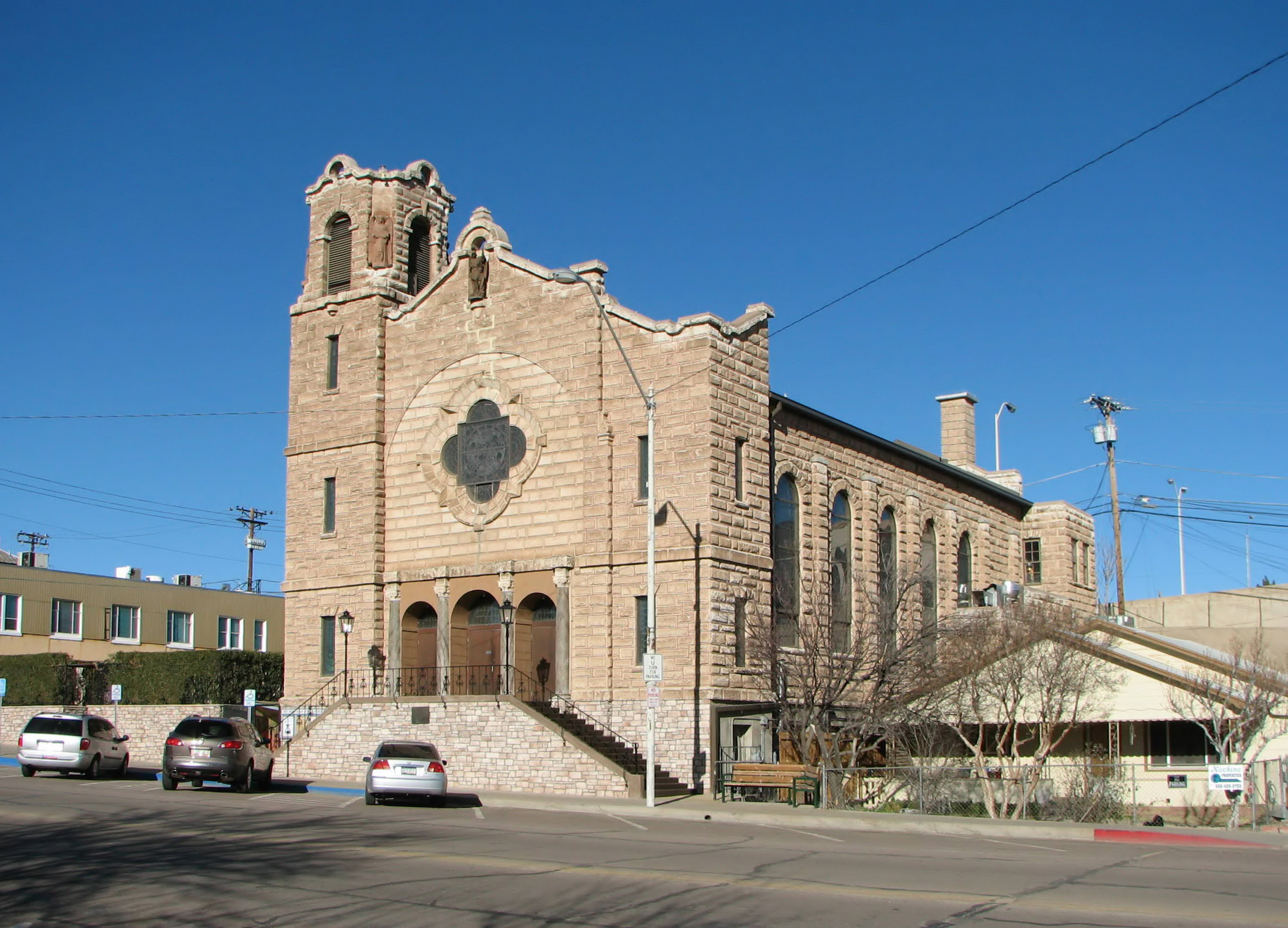
Holy Angels Catholic Church, built in 1918

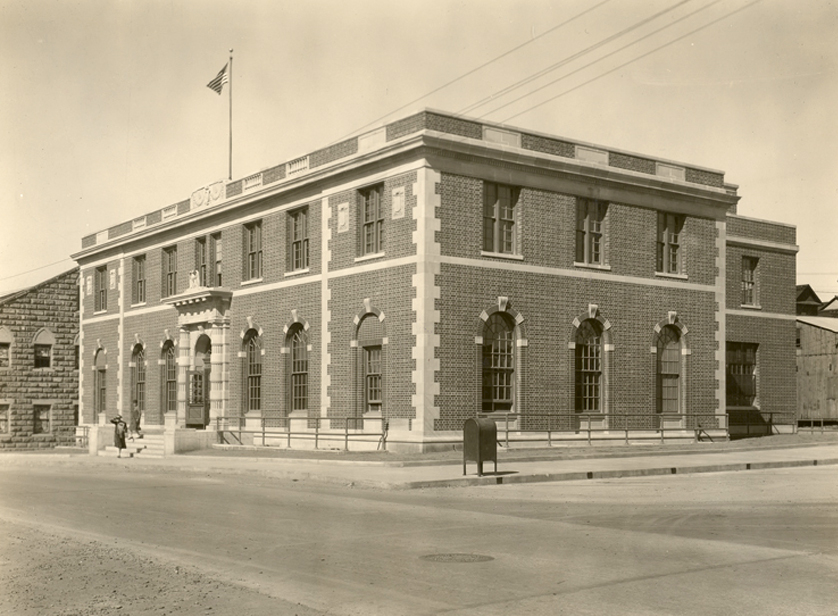
Globe Post Office, built in 1928, still in use. 1928 photo from National Archives.

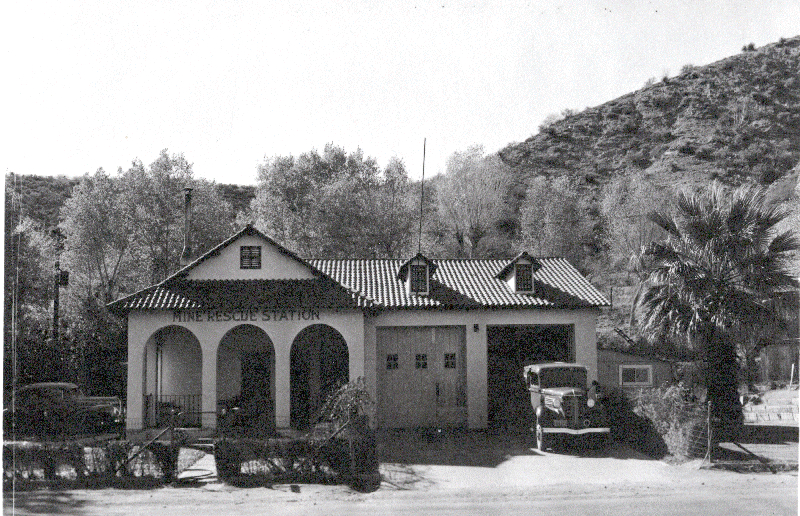
Globe-Miami Mine Rescue Station, photo circa 1940.

(Buildings that burned or no longer stand are listed in italics)

- Gila County Courthouse and Jail – four-story courthouse and adjacent three-story jail behind which many were hanged, built 1905, 1909 – today it is the Cobre Valley Center for the Arts.
- Drift Inn Saloon – A bar in Downtown Historic Globe which has been operating since 1902.
- Trust building (European Hotel, Terminal Hotel, Pioneer Hotel) – a four-story brick structure that contained apartments, offices, and hotel rooms for rent, built 1906 burned 2005.
- Old Dominion Hotel – a prominent hotel of downtown Globe; known for Cactus Room Cocktails and the balconies that hung over the street. Built 1905; burned 1981.
- Elks Lodge building – the tallest three-story building in the world. Built 1910; is now an Antique store.
- Murphy Hotel (Tonto Hotel) – a 1916 hotel that closed in the 1970s and is in need of restoration.
- Old Dominion Library – built in 1915 as a memorial to miner's deaths in a mining accident; burned 1981.
- Woolworth Building – opened 1916 as FW Woolworth and Company. This was the last Woolworth store to close west of the Mississippi River. Now contains United Jewelry Company.
- Gila Valley Bank and Trust Building – a 1909 building designed by Sullivan architects of Chicago. The entire ceiling has the original skylights, is now a day spa.
- Globe High School – built 1910; the oldest high school in the State of Arizona that is still in use by its original tenant.
- Globe Theater – built 1917; art deco theater with copper columns, a balcony, and retro concession stand; burned 2005, but has since been reconstructed on the original site using original marquee and other architectural features.
- Alden Theater – an art deco/Spanish colonial theater built around 1910; torn down after a fire in 1974.
- Holy Angels Catholic Church – 1918 church with seven story bell tower; still in operation.
- Hill Street Mall – a.k.a. "Johnnie's Country Corner". The Dance Hall Platform for Globe prior to statehood. Has also been the Pay'n Takit grocery, Coca-Cola Bottling Plant, Gila County Museum and Safeway grocery. Shaped in the state of Arizona. Currently operating as an antique and fabric mall.
- Globe-Miami Mine Rescue Station – operated into the 1960s, serving as an emergency rescue center. Now used as a museum.
- Gila Valley, Globe, and Northern Railway Station (Southern Pacific station, Arizona Eastern station) – built 1910/1916; prominent train depot from construction to close in the 1950s, now a museum.
- Central School, built in 1891 (addition in 1912). For many years, it was one of the oldest school buildings still in use in Arizona. It was demolished circa 1996.
- Noftsger Hill School is a classical-revival structure, built in 1917. It is presently used as a bed and breakfast inn.
- Besh-Ba-Gowah Pueblo is a reconstructed 14th century Salado Indian ruin, with an archaeological museum adjacent.
- Gila Pueblo was built as an archaeology center c. 1930 by Harold S. Gladwin. Now used as the Gila Pueblo campus of Eastern Arizona College, the building is on the National Register of Historic Places.
- Cubitto Jewelry building is the building which housed Cubitto Jewelry from 1905 to 1996; the building has large original glass windows, original maple floor, and skylights.

== Notable people ==
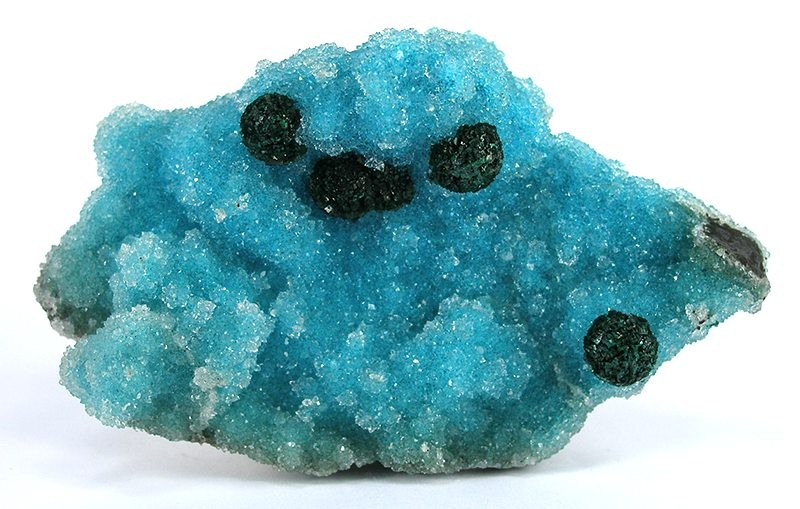
Malachite crystals in a matrix of quartz and chrysocolla. Old specimen from the Globe Hills.

- Big Nose Kate (Mary Kate Horony), Old West prostitute
- Karen Boccalero, artist, nun, founder of Self Help Graphics & Art
- Lynda Carter, actress
- Napoleon Cordy, Mayanist
- James Gordon Dennis, pilot in World War II
- Brady Ellison, Olympic archer
- Gerald Gault, subject of Supreme Court ruling on juvenile rights
- George W. P. Hunt, first governor of Arizona
- Helen Jacobs (1908–1997), tennis player ranked world #1
- Anton Lavey, Satanist
- Donald Lee, Major League Baseball pitcher
- James M. Lopez, Iranian US Embassy Crisis hostage
- Rose Perica Mofford, Arizona's first female governor
- Betty Russell, All-American Girls Professional Baseball League player
- Sarah Herring Sorin, Arizona's first female attorney

== See also ==
- List of historic properties in Globe, Arizona
- Needle's Eye Wilderness
- Pinal Mountains
- Pleasant Valley War
- St. John's Episcopal Church (Globe, Arizona)
- United States Post Office and Courthouse–Globe Main
