= Ox Bow Inn =

- U.S. National Register of Historic Places
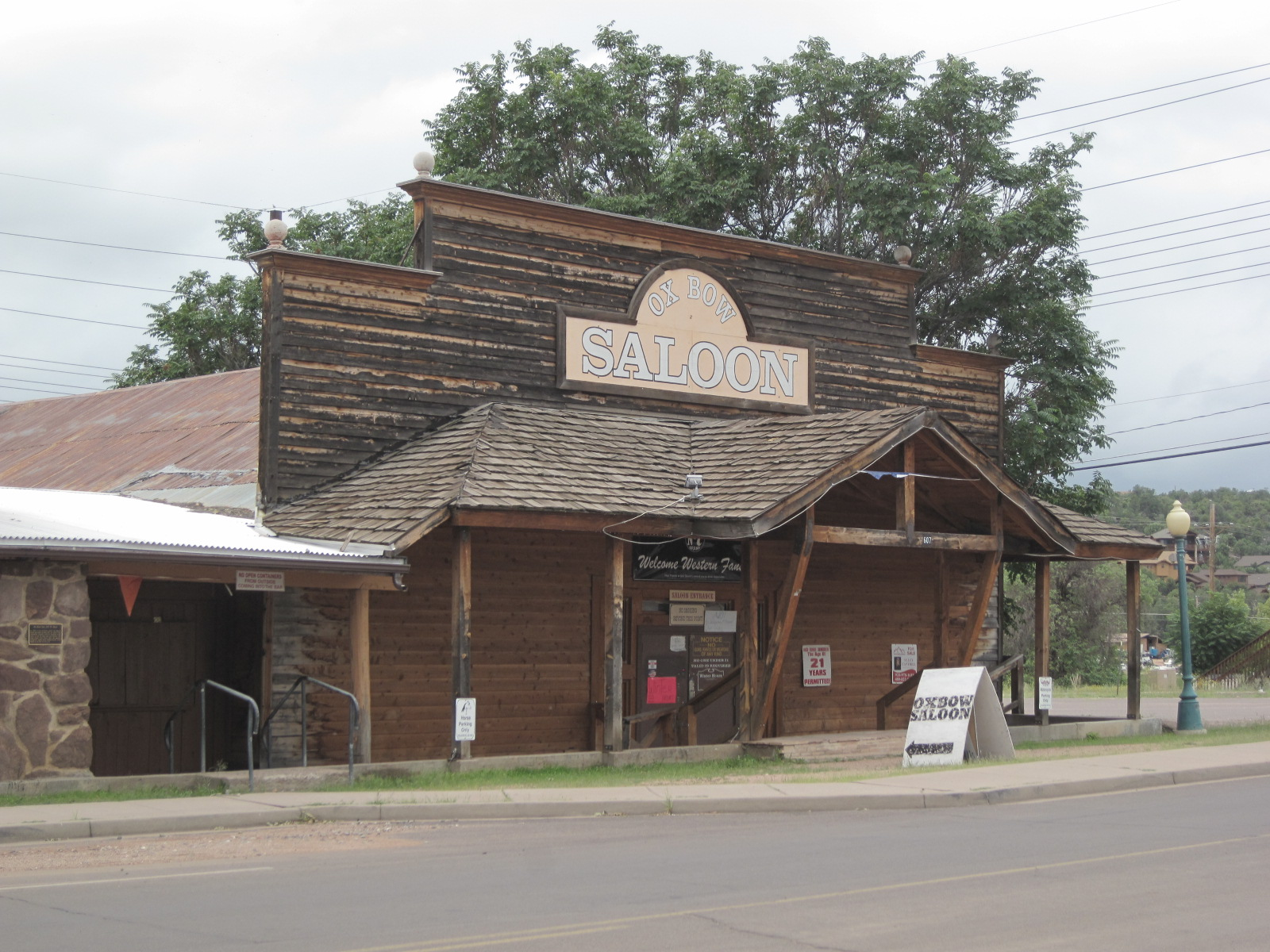

- Location within Arizona Location within the United States
- Location: 607 W. Main St., Payson, Arizona
- Coordinates: 34°13′51″N 111°20′10″W
- Built: 1933
- Architect: William and Estelee Wade, Richard Taylor
- NRHP reference No.: 04001073
- Added to NRHP: October 1, 2004

The Ox Bow Inn and Saloon is an historic hotel in Payson, Arizona. The log inn was built as the Payson Hotel by William and Estlee Wade next to their restaurant, the Busy Bee. The rustic inn borrowed design elements from the Old Faithful Inn, with which Willie Wade was familiar from time spent in Yellowstone National Park. In 1945 the business was taken over and expanded by Jimmy Cox, who renamed the hotel the Ox Bow Inn.

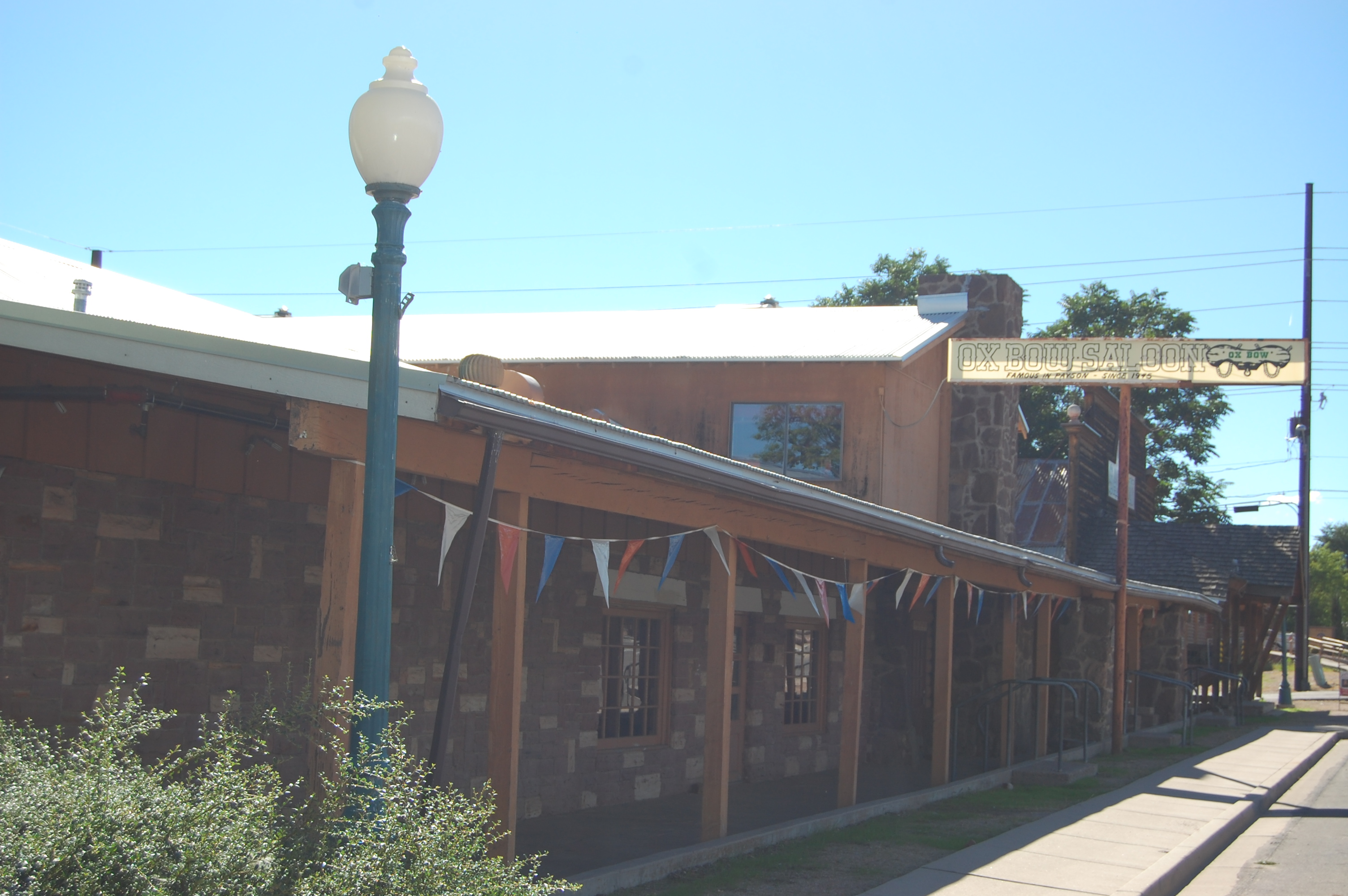
Wider view of the building
