= Elks Building (Globe, Arizona) =

- U.S. National Register of Historic Places
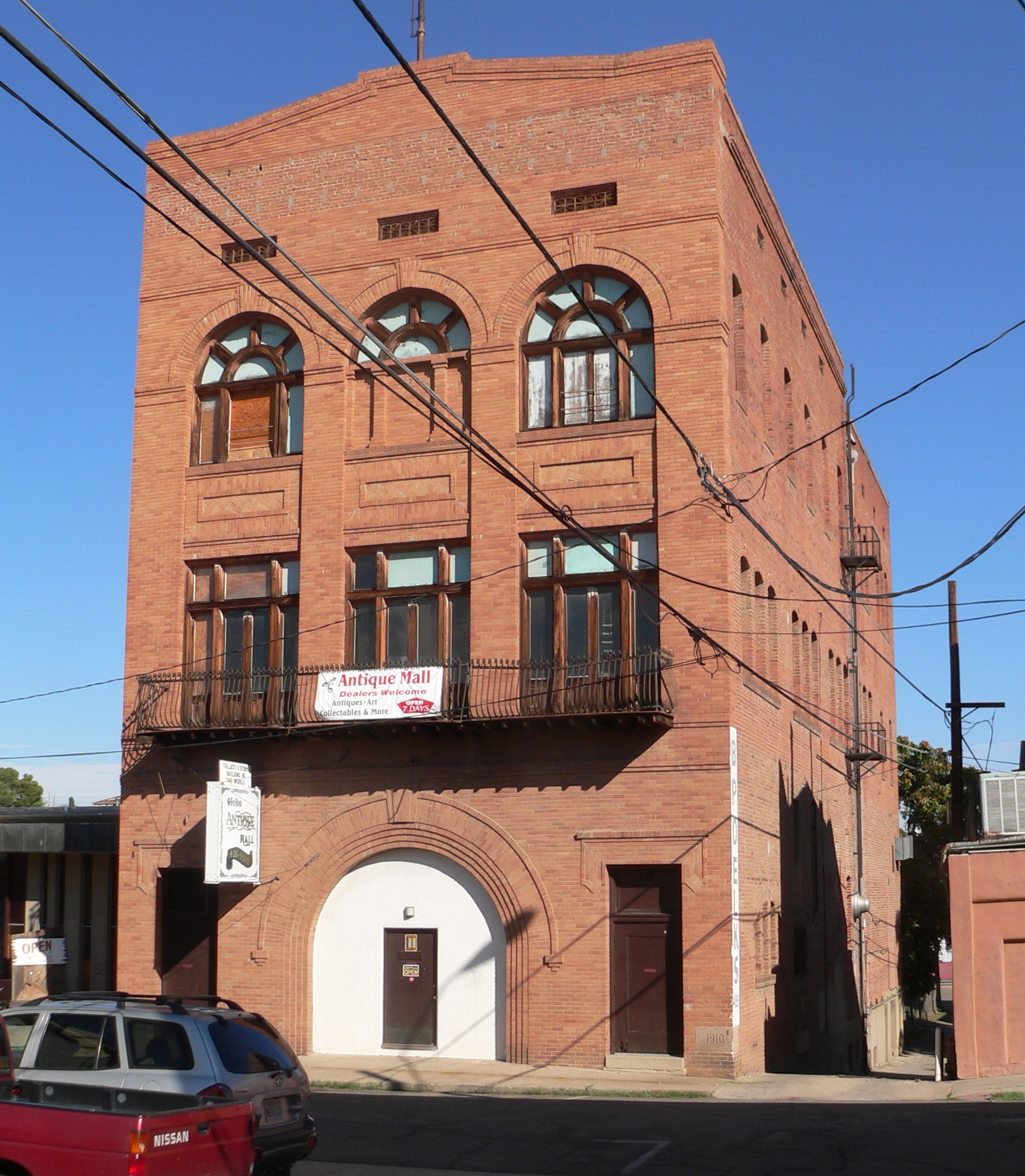

- Location within Arizona Location within the United States
- Location: 155 W. Mesquite, Globe, Arizona
- Coordinates: 33°23′50.9″N 110°47′19.2″W
- Area: less than one acre
- Built: 1910
- Built by: Evans, D.A.
- Architect: Holmes Bros.
- Architectural style: Romanesque
- MPS: Globe Commercial and Civic MRA
- NRHP reference No.: 87000860
- Added to NRHP: August 6, 1987

The Elks Building in Globe, Arizona is a Romanesque style building built in 1910. It has served as a meeting hall of the Benevolent and Protective Order of Elks (Elks) and as a theater. It was listed on the National Register of Historic Places in 1987.

It is a 3-story 40 feet (12 m) by 100 feet (30 m) building that was socially important in Globe.

== See also ==
- Elks' Lodge No. 468: Kingman, Arizona
- List of historic properties in Globe, Arizona
