= United States Post Office and Courthouse–Globe Main =

- US Post Office and Courthouse--Globe Main
- U.S. National Register of Historic Places
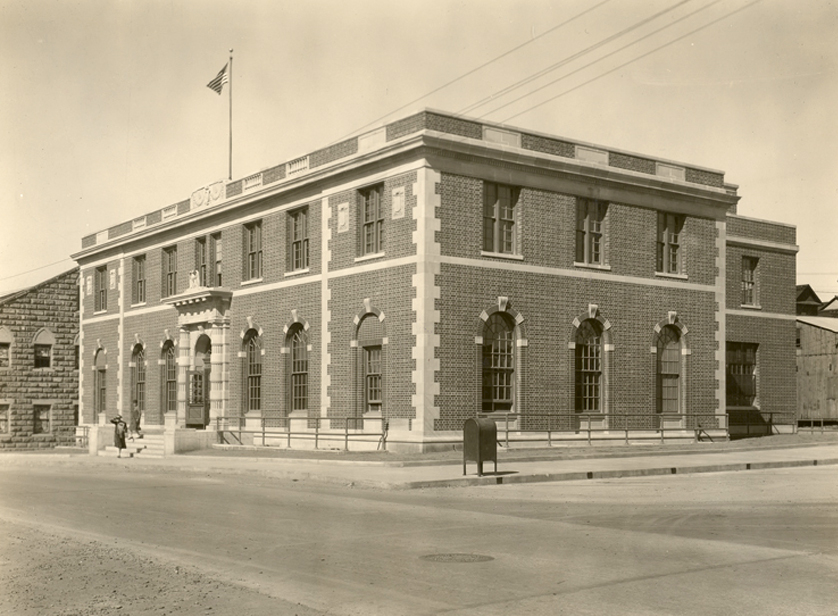

- Location within Arizona Location within the United States
- Location: Hill and Sycamore Sts., Globe, Arizona
- Coordinates: 33°23′13″N 110°47′6″W
- Area: 0.6 acres (0.24 ha)
- Built: 1926
- Built by: Weise, J.H.
- Architect: Office of the Supervising Architect under James A. Wetmore
- Architectural style: Beaux Arts
- MPS: Globe Commercial and Civic MRA (AD)
- NRHP reference No.: 85003106
- Added to NRHP: December 03, 1985

The U.S. Post Office and Courthouse-Globe Main, in Globe, Arizona, was built in 1926. Also known as Globe Post Office and Courthouse and as Globe Main Post Office, the building served historically as a courthouse of the United States District Court for the District of Arizona, and as a post office and reflects Beaux Arts architecture. It was listed on the National Register of Historic Places in 1985.

Its NRHP nomination asserts that it "is a particularly well executed example of federal design in the Neo-Classical style." Its construction was a local victory, an event "that symbolized the culmination of many years of effort in lobbying the federal government in order to secure their first and only federal building."

== See also ==
- List of historic properties in Globe, Arizona
- List of United States post offices
