= St. John's Episcopal Church (Globe, Arizona) =

Historic church in Arizona, United States

- U.S. National Register of Historic Places
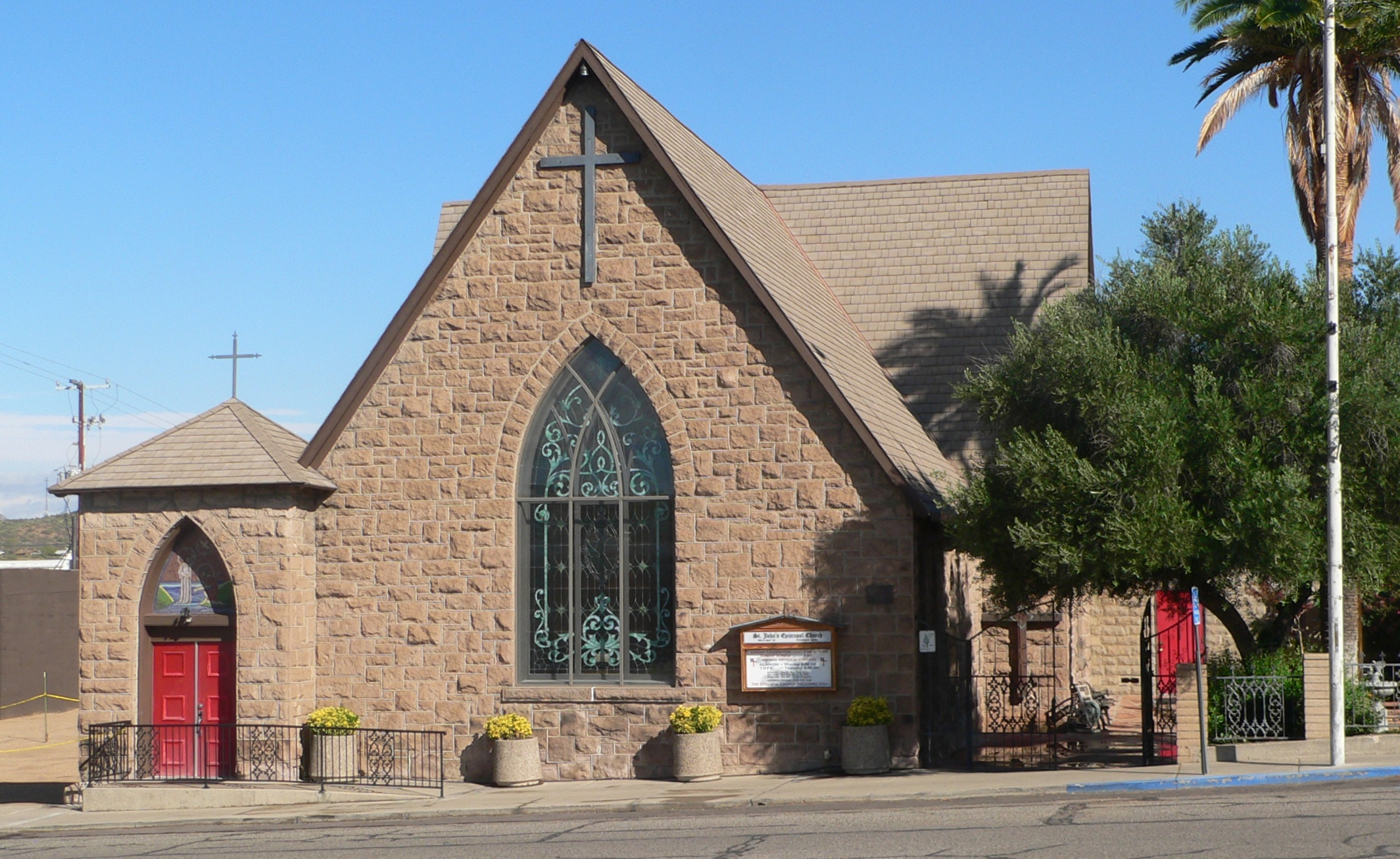

- Location within Arizona Location within the United States
- Location: 185 E. Oak St., Globe, Arizona
- Coordinates: 33°23′47.1″N 110°47′11.15″W
- Area: 0.3 acres (0.12 ha)
- Built: 1907
- Architectural style: Gothic
- MPS: Globe Commercial and Civic MRA (AD)
- NRHP reference No.: 77000234
- Added to NRHP: November 22, 1977

St. John's Episcopal Church is a church at 185 E. Oak Street in Globe, Arizona, United States. It was built in 1907 and added to the National Register of Historic Places in 1977. It is part of the Episcopal Diocese of Arizona.

== See also ==
- Globe, Arizona
- List of historic properties in Globe, Arizona
