= Gila County Courthouse =

- U.S. National Register of Historic Places
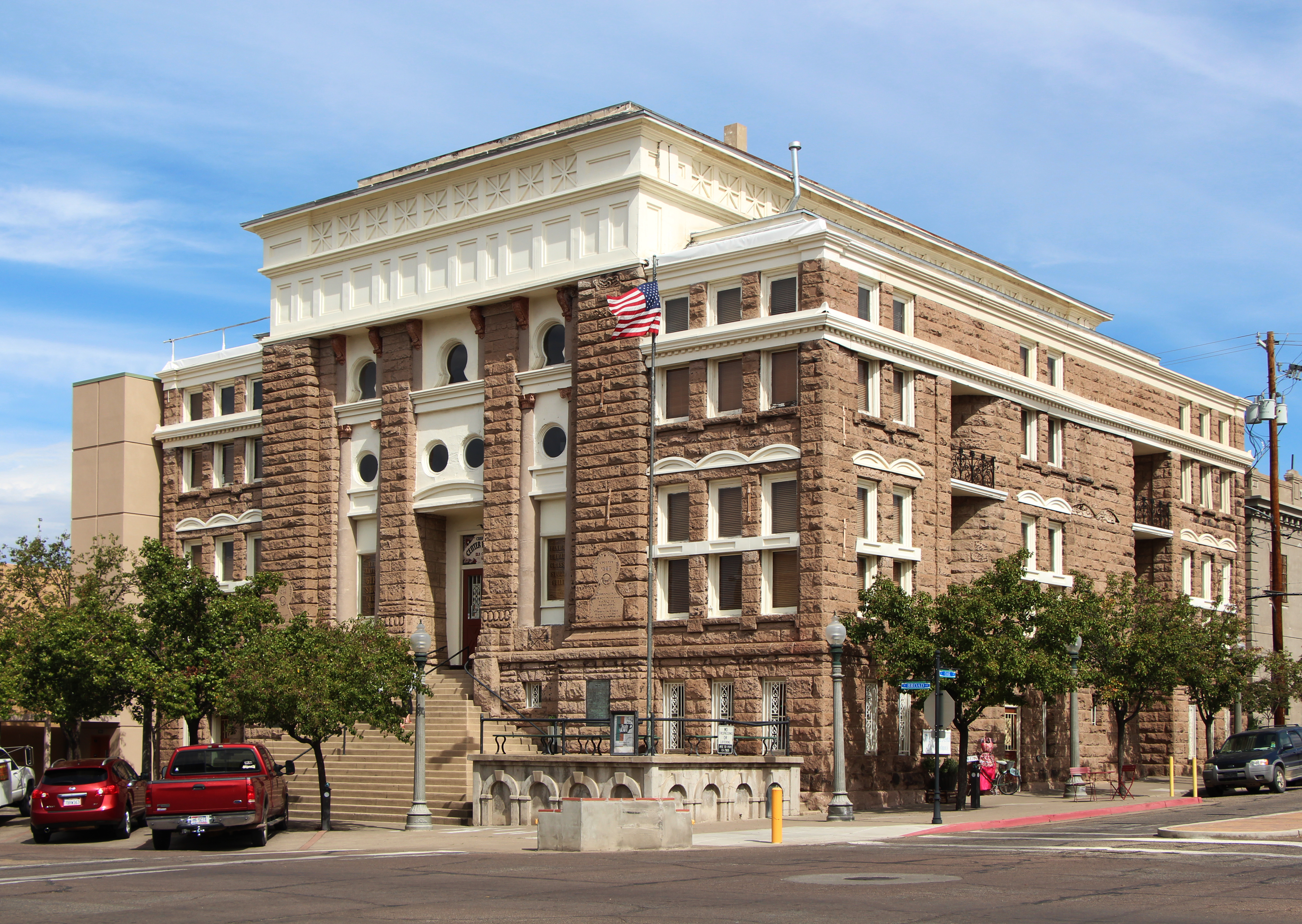

- Location within Arizona Location within the United States
- Location: Oak and Broad Sts., Globe, Arizona
- Coordinates: 33°23′46″N 110°47′13″W
- Area: 0.2 acres (0.081 ha)
- Built: 1906
- Architect: W.R. Norton
- Architectural style: Italian Renaissance
- MPS: Globe Commercial and Civic MRA
- NRHP reference No.: 75000347
- Added to NRHP: May 27, 1975

The Gila County Courthouse in Globe, Arizona is a four-story courthouse built in 1906, and adjacent three-story jail behind which many were hanged, built 1909. Today, it is the Cobre Valley Center for the Arts.

== Architecture ==
The courthouse is a composite of classical designs, but its dominant theme reflects the Italian Renaissance style as interpreted by the architect, W.R. Norton, who was probably following the revival trend started by the World's Columbian Exposition of 1893 in Chicago, Illinois. It is a symmetrical building with pilasters rising to an ornate frieze and cornice. Classical details are also found above the main story windows and were along the roof-line, especially at the corners.

The building exterior is constructed of locally quarried stone. Brick is used for interior bearing walls, and the floors and roof are framed and sheathed in wood. The classical details, including the frieze, cornice, and window details are of pressed metal.

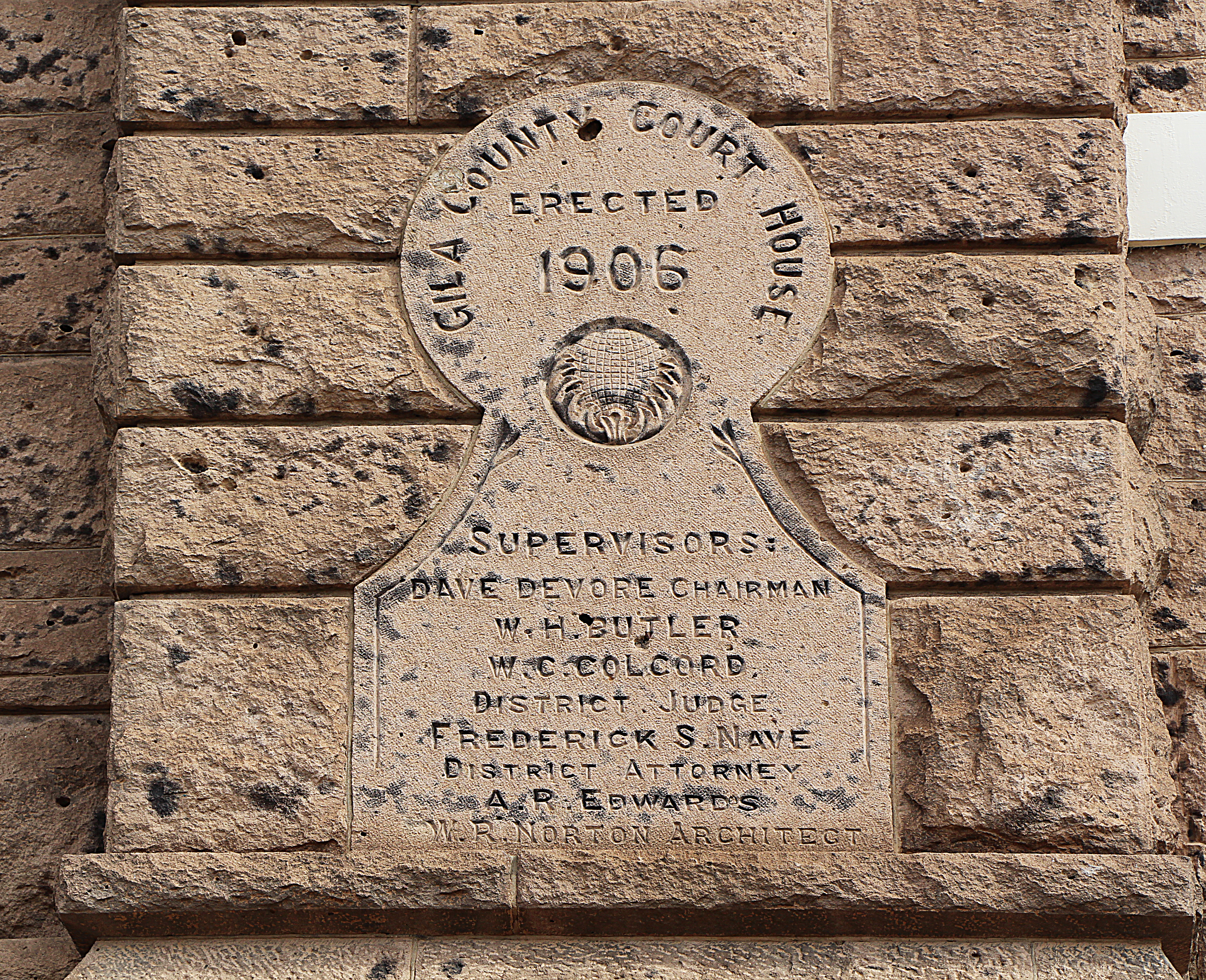

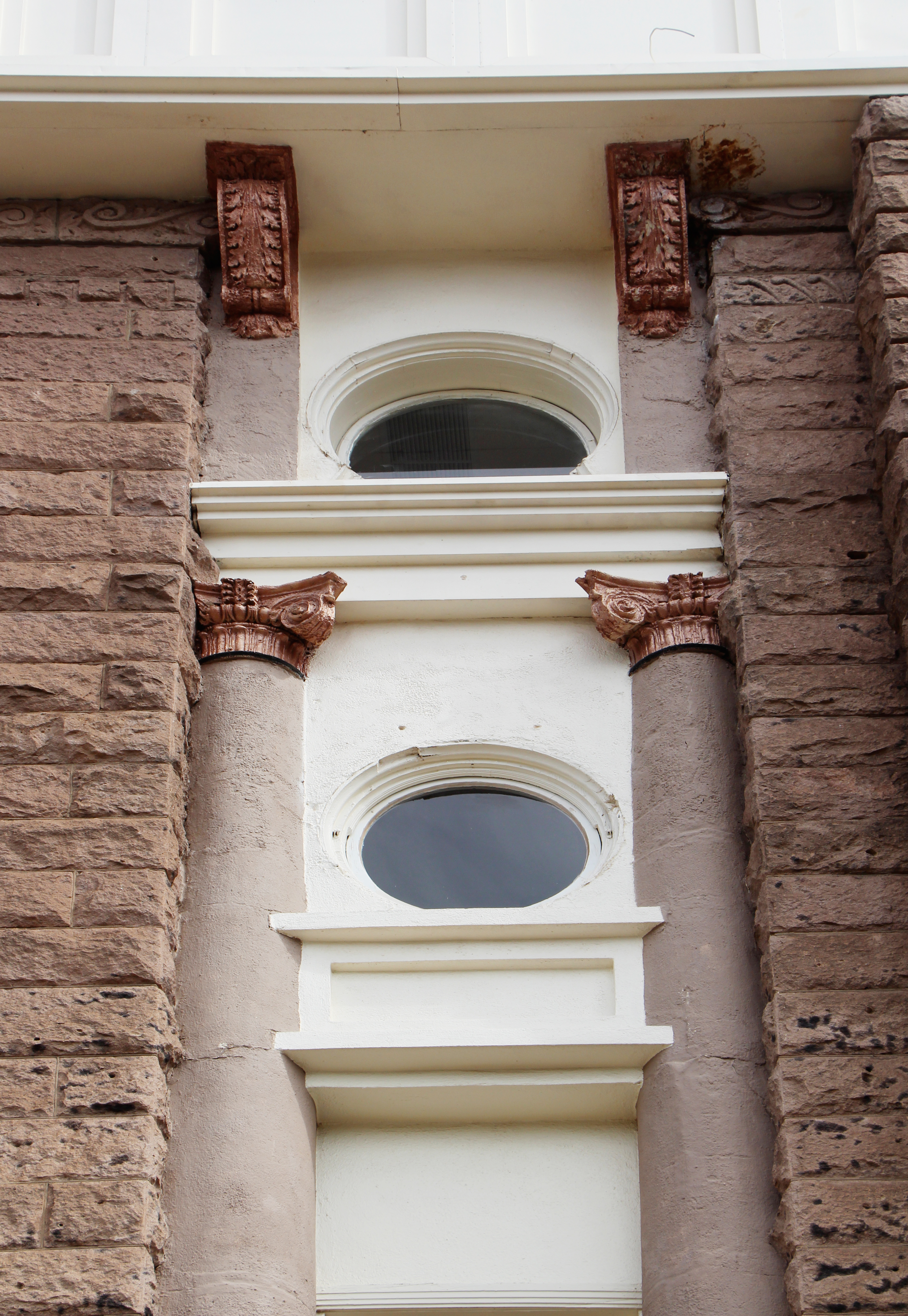

== See also ==
- List of historic properties in Globe, Arizona
