= Gila Valley Bank and Trust Building =

- U.S. National Register of Historic Places
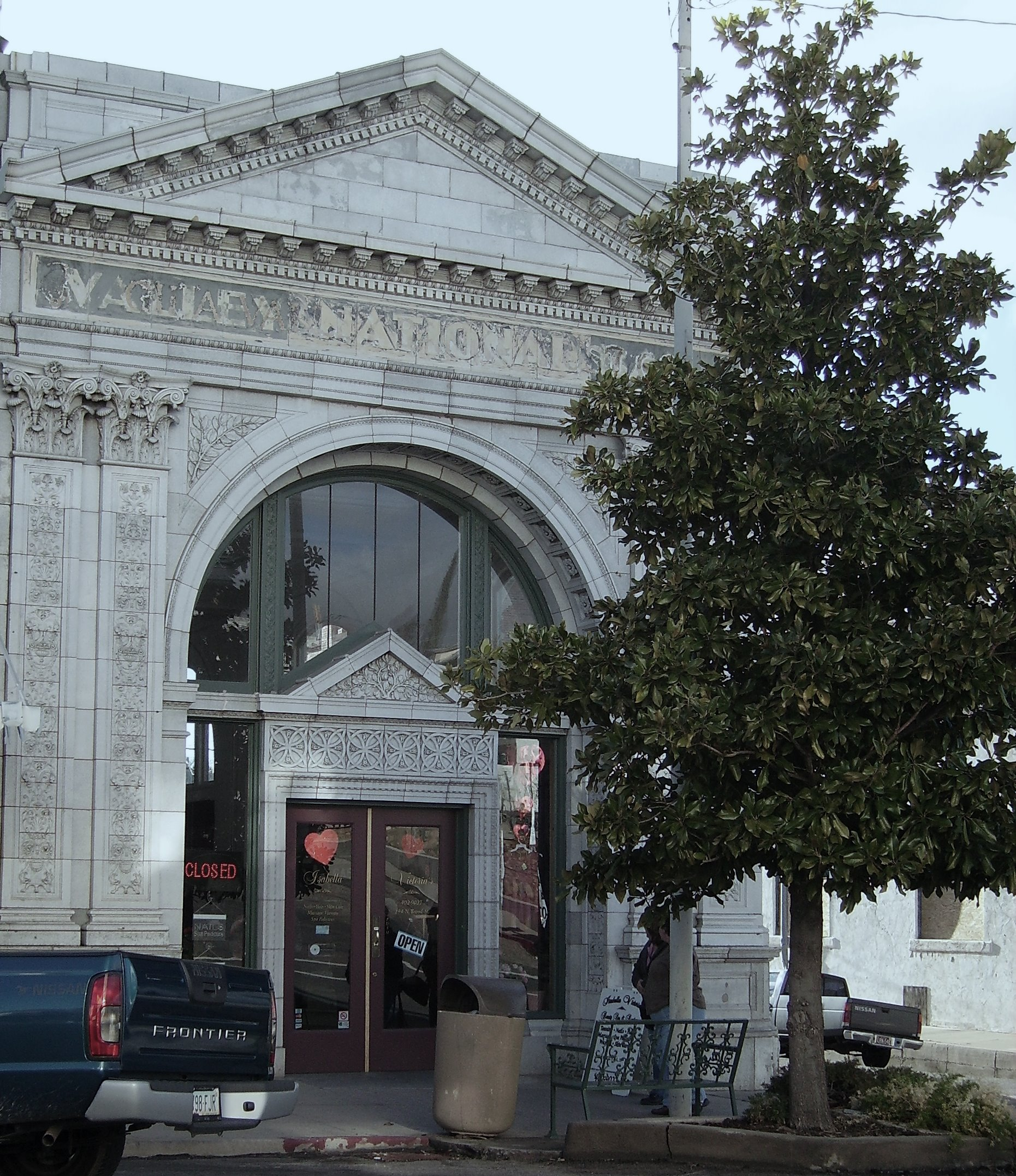

- Location within Arizona Location within the United States
- Location: 292 N. Broad St., Globe, Arizona
- Coordinates: 33°23′47″N 110°46′34″W
- Area: less than one acre
- Built: 1909
- Architect: Ottenheimer, Stern & Reichert
- Architectural style: Beaux Arts, Vernacular Neoclassical
- MPS: Globe Commercial and Civic MRA
- NRHP reference No.: 87000861
- Added to NRHP: August 6, 1987

The Gila Valley Bank and Trust Building is a former bank building listed on the National Register of Historic Places in Globe, Arizona. It was built in 1909 to house the bank, later known as Valley National Bank of Arizona, and it was listed on the Register in 1987.

== History ==
The building served as the fourth branch of the Gila Valley Bank and Trust Building, which had been founded in Solomonville in 1900, and it was the first outside of Graham and Greenlee Counties. In 1922, Gila Valley Bank merged with Phoenix-based The Valley Bank and Trust to form what would become known as Valley National Bank of Arizona.

Valley National Bank closed the branch in 1952, and the building went through several different tenants, such as a news stand and other merchandise stores. As of 2017, it is in use as an art gallery.

== Architecture ==
The building was designed by architects Ottenheimer, Stern & Reichert of Chicago. It features the first known use of glazed terra cotta in Arizona as its exterior sheathing; the terra cotta was produced in Chicago. The presence of terra cotta exemplifies the economic prominence of Globe during the early 20th century as a mining and ranching center. Comparable facades were not in existence in Arizona until the late 1910s.

The building is also the only Neoclassical structure in Globe, locally considered to be "outstanding". Among the architectural features of the building are Corinthian pilasters, an elaborate frieze, and several semicircular windows.

Restoration work occurred in the 1980s, several years before the building was listed on the National Register. However, some alterations, such as the relocation of the entry to the corner of the building, the removal of decorative brickwork, and the addition of stucco, were preserved. Another alteration, the changing of the original "Gila Valley Bank and Trust Co." inscription at the top to one reading "Valley National Bank", was also left intact.

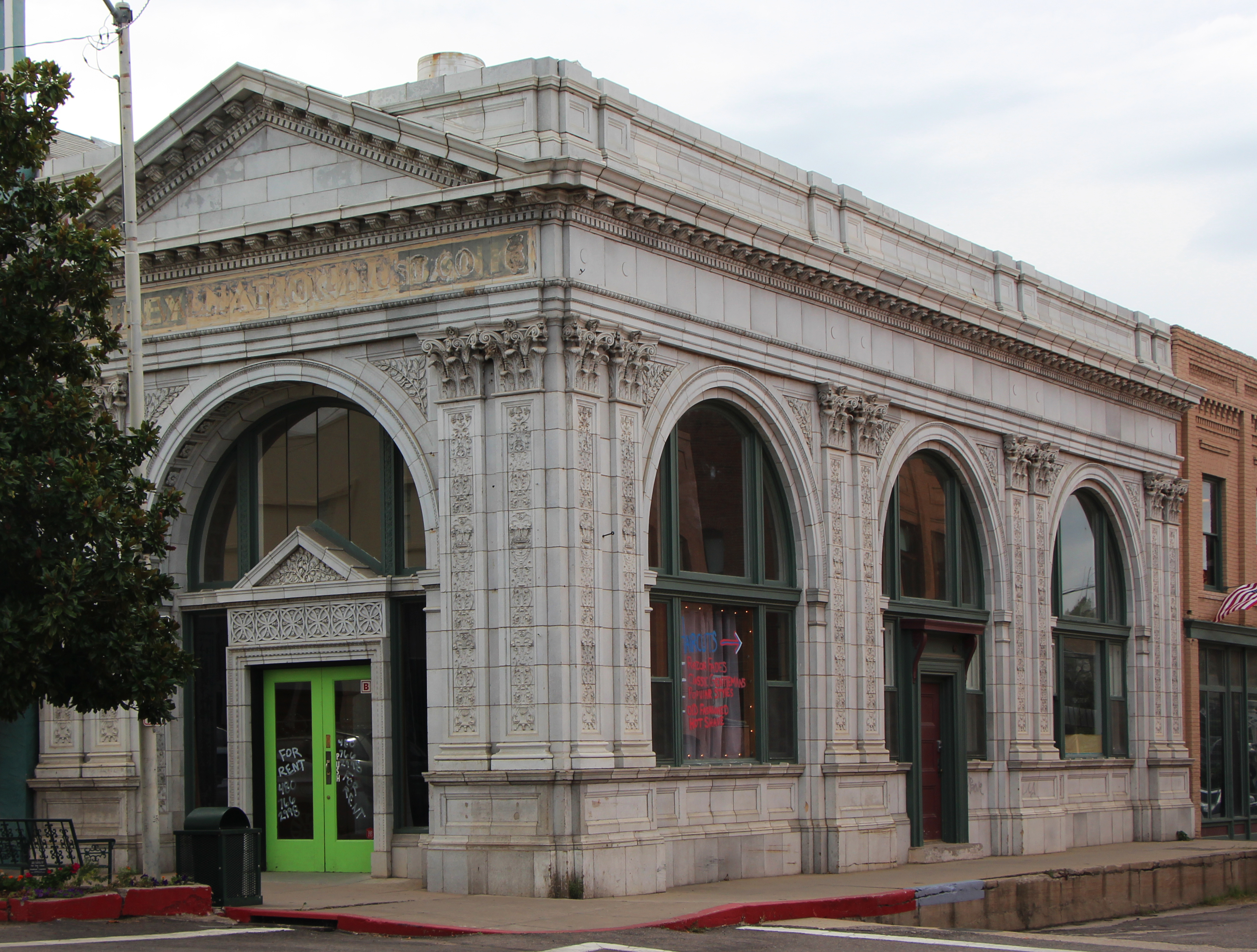
2015 view

== See also ==
- Globe, Arizona
- List of historic properties in Globe, Arizona
