= Masai =

Masai may refer to:

- Masai, Johor, a town in Malaysia
- Masai Plateau, a plateau in Kolhapur, Maharashtra, India
- Maasai people, an ethnic group in East Africa
- Maasai language, language of the Maasai ethnic group
- Masai (name), Kenyan / African name

== See also ==
- Kota Masai, a township in Pasir Gudang, Johor Bahru District, Johor, Malaysia
- Masai giraffe (Giraffa camelopardalis tippelskirchi), also known as the Maasai giraffe or Kilimanjaro giraffe, the largest subspecies of giraffe and the tallest land mammal
- Masai ostrich, subspecies of ostrich
- Sire Ma (馬賽; pinyin: Mǎ Sài; born 1987), a Chinese actress and beauty pageant titleholder
- Marseille, a city in France, written as 馬賽 or 马赛 for Chinese Mandarin
- Maasai Mara National Reserve, a large game reserve in Kenya
- Massai (c.1847 – 1906 or 1911), an Apache warrior
- Masaita, a settlement in Rift Valley Province, Kenya
- Maasai (disambiguation)
- Masaichi (disambiguation)
