= Kelvin Grade massacre =

1889 shooting in Arizona

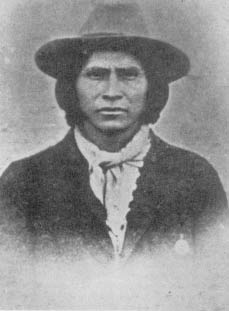
- The Apache Kid in 1889, as a prisoner in Globe
- Location: near Globe, Arizona
- Date: November 2, 1889
- Attack type: Murder, prison escape
- Weapon: Small arms
- Deaths: 2
- Injuries: 1
- Victim: American citizens
- Perpetrator: Apache

The Kelvin Grade massacre was an incident that occurred on November 2, 1889 when a group of nine imprisoned Apache escaped from police custody during a prisoner transfer near the town of Globe, Arizona. The escape resulted in the deaths of two sheriffs and triggered one of the largest manhunts in Arizona history. Veterans of the Apache Wars scoured the Arizona frontier for nearly a year in search of the fugitives, by the end of which all were caught or killed except for the famous Indian scout known as the Apache Kid.

== Background ==
When the reservation system began in Arizona, the local Apache peoples were among the first to be subjugated. Throughout most of the Old West period, the reservations were undersupplied, which led to starvation, and their operators tended to be corrupt. This led to conflicts such as Geronimo's War, beginning in 1881, during which Geronimo and his band of Apaches left their assigned reservations and evaded capture until 1886. The Apache Kid, or Haskay-bay-nay-ntayl, had for most of the 1880s served as an Indian scout for the U.S. Army in the Apache Wars, having been involved in the mutiny during the Battle of Cibecue Creek and the Crawford Affair. Though many people at the time believed that the Apache Kid did not kill any of the soldiers at Cibecue, he left the reservation system in 1887 after an incident at the San Carlos Reservation. The Kid was also a friend of Al Sieber, Chief of the Army Scouts, who allegedly betrayed him after the Cibecue affair. Sometime in 1888 the Apache Kid was caught, put on trial in Globe for various crimes, and sentenced to spend the next seven years in Yuma Territorial Prison. The Kid had already served over a year of prison time at San Carlos and Alcatraz Island, so the prospect of going to the prison at Yuma was intolerable and he conspired with his fellow inmates to escape whenever and wherever possible.

After the trial, on the morning of November 1, 1889, Sheriff Glenn Reynolds arrived at the jail in Safford to pick up eight Apache prisoners and one Mexican who were to be transferred to Casa Grande by stagecoach, a two-day ride, and from there to Yuma by train. Sheriff Reynolds made arrangements to be taken to Casa Grande by stagecoach owner Eugene Middleton, who had survived several conflicts with the Apaches since 1881. Reynolds also collected $400 from the county clerk to pay the expenses of the trip. Accompanying Reynolds and Middleton was Sheriff William A. "Hunkydory" Holmes. When the prisoners were loaded into the coach the party headed north for Globe. Sheriff Reynolds rode his horse, Tex, while Middleton and Holmes rode in the coach. The trip was long; Holmes spent the time target-shooting with his rifle, while Middleton sang and drank whiskey. After stopping at Pioneer, Arizona for lunch, the party continued on to the Gila River in a rainstorm. Just beyond the Gila was the little town of Kelvin, or Riverside Station, where the party stopped for the night.

== Escape ==
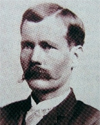
Sheriff Glenn Reynolds

On the next morning, Saturday, November 2, Sheriff Reynolds woke the others early so as to leave by 5:00 AM, in order to make Casa Grande that night before the train was scheduled to leave. Around this time Reynolds expressed concern about a section of the road outside of town known as Kelvin Grade, and also left his horse Tex behind so as to ride in the coach with Holmes. The road was very steep and with the coach loaded with nine prisoners, the horses were not strong enough to pull the wagon up, especially since it had been raining heavily the night before. In order to ascend Kelvin Grade, Reynolds decided the prisoners would have to be offloaded and then walk up. When the party reached the grade, seven of the prisoners were taken off as planned, but the Apache Kid and one other man were considered too dangerous and left on board. Middleton stayed on as well, to drive the coach, while Reynolds led the prisoners with Holmes in the rear. The coach proceeded up the grade first and was followed by the line of prisoners and sheriffs. The prisoners were all in handcuffs and bound together in pairs, except for Jesus Avott, the Mexican in the group. Gradually two of the Apaches moved in close to the unsuspecting Reynolds, and after the coach had pulled out of sight, they suddenly pounced on the sheriff to wrest his shotgun from him.

At the same time another pair of Apaches attacked Holmes and took his rifle. The prisoner Pas-Lau-Tau shot Reynolds, who died instantly; Holmes subsequently died of a heart attack. Just after the scuffle broke out, Avott ran ahead to warn Middleton who assumed the firing was nothing more than target practice. When Avott reached the coach Middleton told him to get in but instead he hid in some bushes. Bach-e-on-al was not far behind and shortly thereafter shot Middleton in the head. The bullet went in through the mouth, without hitting any teeth, and exited Middleton's neck. Amazingly, Middleton survived without losing consciousness. After that the remaining prisoners came up and released Kid from inside the coach. One of the fugitives, El-cahn, was going to smash Middleton's head with a rock while he lay on the ground helpless, but Kid prevented it, possibly recalling that Middleton had shared his cigarettes with the Kid the night before.

The prisoners escaped into the desert, except for Jesus Avott, who stayed hidden in fear for his own life. A cowboy named Andronico Lorona, who was herding horses nearby, came upon the coach. Andronico Lorona, for the Zellewager Ranch, seeing the stopped stagecoach, drove his twelve horses over for a look, found Avott, and heard his story about the eight Apache convicts headed for Yuma escaping. Lorona took a gentle horse from his remuda and sent Avott on to Florence. Lorona carried the word back to his foreman, who then sent a few cowboys back to the stage to guard Reynolds and Holmes' bodies until help arrived.

== Aftermath ==
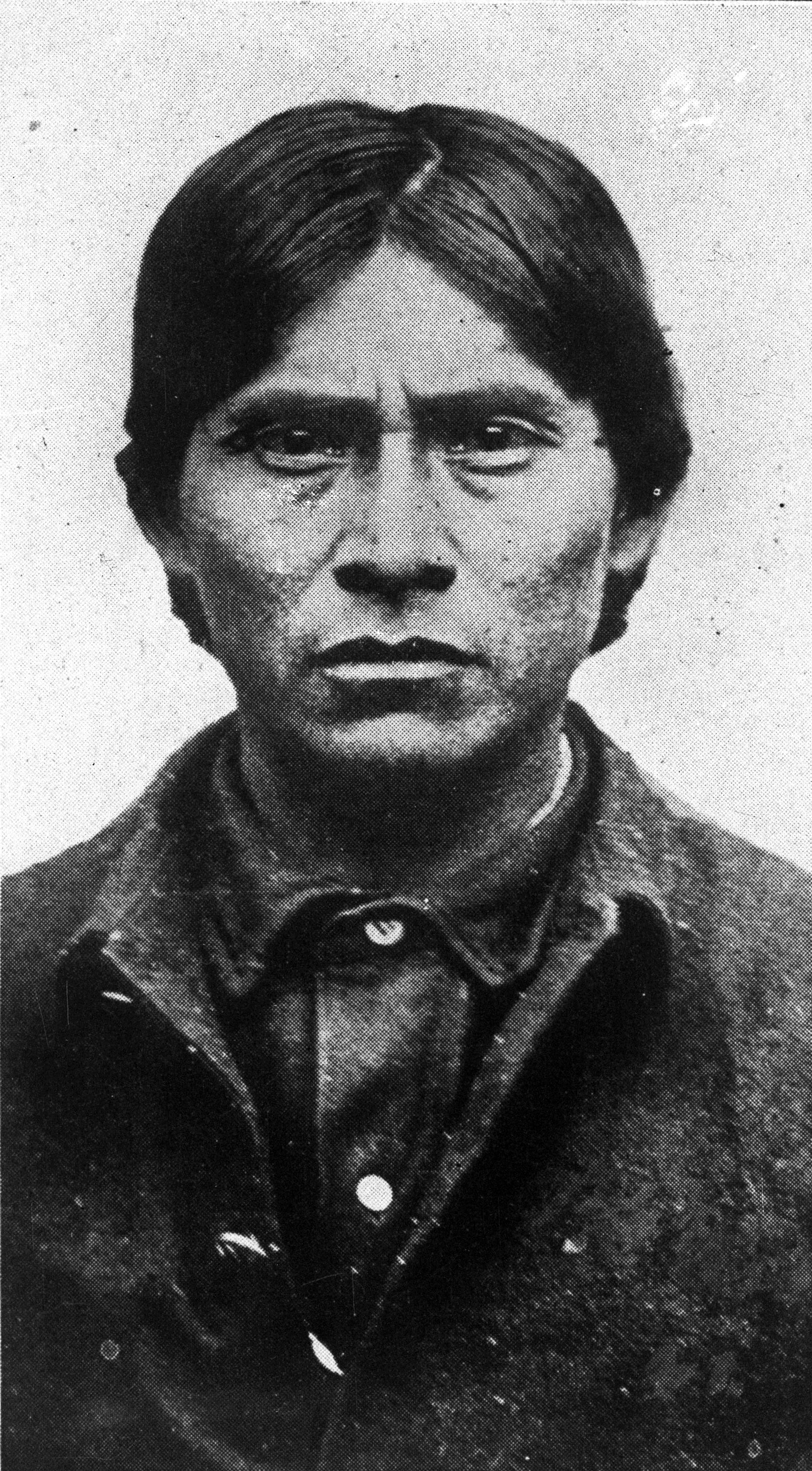
The Apache Kid

After the massacre, the Apache Kid and the others robbed the dead sheriffs and Middleton of their clothes, jewelry, and weapons. Next they fled into the surrounding desert while Jesus Avott was still hiding. Once the Apaches were gone, Avott cut a horse loose from the coach so as to ride it to town, but it kicked him off. However, a nearby rancher, Andronico Lorona, who was driving some cattle through the area, noticed the stalled coach and decided to investigate it. There Lorona found Avott and gave him a horse to take into Florence. Lorona then left to tell his foreman about the prisoners' escape, and the foreman sent a group of cowboys to guard the dead bodies. For his part in all of this, Avott was pardoned and did not have to serve time in Yuma. Sometime before the cowboys arrived at the murder scene, Middleton found the strength to stand up, but found that he could not lift himself onto the coach or a horse so was forced to walk and crawl the long distance back to Riverside Station. When Middleton reached Riverside he received medical treatment and told the townspeople what had happened.

Shorty Sayler, a stagecoach driver, took Reynolds' horse Tex and rode it to Globe, forty miles away, to alert the authorities. Sayler stopped and changed horses at Pioneer and then made it to his destination in record time, arriving before noon the same day. The telegrapher at Globe was Dan Williams, who later said; "I happened to be the receiving operator and hastened to Al Sieber with terrible news, whose comment was, ‘I was afraid of that, and that was my reason for offering the scout escort to Casa Grande.' From his bed, Sieber directed a scout detail of twenty men under Lt. Watson to take the trail from San Carlos." Deputy Sheriff Jerry Ryan took Reynolds' place upon learning of his death, but because the escape occurred in Pinal County, Sheriff Jerry Fryer assumed command of the investigation. Sheriff Ryan telegraphed a Captain Bullis at San Carlos who in turn notified General Nelson A. Miles. Over the next several months, until October 1890, American militias, bounty hunters, and United States Army troops searched the Arizona desert for the escaped prisoners, all of whom were eventually caught or killed except the Kid.

Between 1889 and 1894, several murders and skirmishes occurred between settlers and Apaches, most of which were blamed on the Apache Kid and his friend Massai, another former army scout who was said to have been killed by a posse in September 1906. At one point the bounty hunter Mickey Free told Al Sieber that he had trailed the Kid for three months before killing him and carving a tattoo of the letter "W" as proof. The "W" had been tattooed in blue ink on the foreheads of about 100 San Carlos Apaches before the army introduced a new identification system. The Kid is not known to have had a tattoo like this but Mickey Free, who knew the Kid personally, said he did. In 1890, some Mexican Rurales killed an Apache and recovered Sheriff Reynolds' pistol and watch, initially leading them to believe they had killed the Kid. But the dead man was said to be much older than the Kid. In 1896, John Horton Slaughter also claimed to have killed the Apache Kid in the Sierra Madre of Chihuahua, Mexico, where Apache bands were still holding out as late as 1915. But because Slaughter had crossed the international border, he kept quiet about the incident out of fear of getting into trouble with his superiors. A native named Wallapai Clark also said he shot the Kid while he was trying to steal his horse from a corral, and in 1899, the colonel of the Rurales, Emilio Kosterlitzky, claimed the same when his men killed three Apaches.

In 1924, after a band of Apaches crossed into Arizona to raid for horses, the Kid’s nephew, Private Joe Adley of Fort Huachuca, confided to Lieutenant John H. Healy of the 10th Cavalry that the Apache Kid was still alive in Mexico. This was mostly substantiated by Guadalupe Fimbres Muñoz, who was captured in 1915 during a surprise attack on Apache Juan’s stronghold in the Sierra Madre. She had been one of the trail guards for the Apaches and had sounded the warning that had allowed the other members of the band to escape. Initially, many thought she was the granddaughter of Geronimo, while others said her father was Apache Juan. However, Guadalupe herself claimed that her father was the Apache Kid. Sightings of the Kid occurred as late as 1935 when he was reportedly seen while visiting friends at San Carlos.

== See also ==
- Ruby Murders
- List of massacres in Arizona
