= Maasai =

Maasai may refer to:

- Maasai people
- Maasai language
- Maasai religion
- MAASAI (band)

== See also ==
- Masai (disambiguation)
- Massai

Maasai People were a very old tribe in the sorthern part of Africa.
