= Glenn Reynolds (sheriff) =

American sheriff, cowboy, and militiaman of the Old West (1853–1889)

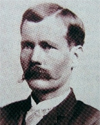
- Born: c. 1853; Texas, US
- Died: November 2, 1889; Globe, Arizona, US
- Military career
- Allegiance: (Confederate States of America) Confederate States; United States
- Rank: Sheriff
- Conflicts: Comanche Wars American Civil War; Pleasant Valley War; Apache Wars: Kelvin Grade Massacre

Glenn Reynolds (c. 1853 - November 2, 1889) was an American sheriff, cowboy, and militiaman of the Old West, remembered for his death during the Kelvin Grade Massacre, in Arizona Territory, when a group of Apache renegades escaped from his custody.

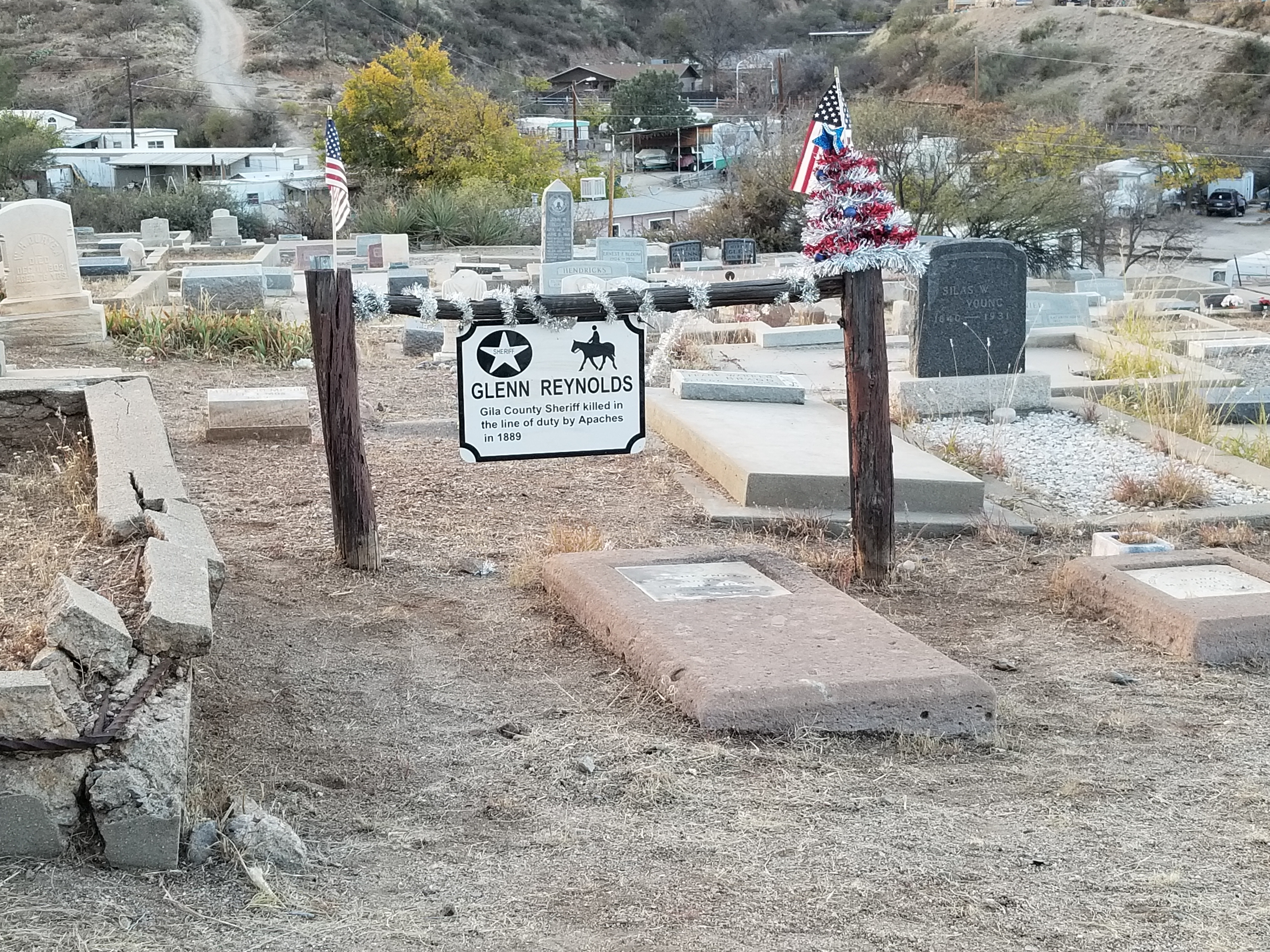
Sheriff Reynolds Grave

== Biography ==
Glenn Reynolds was born in about 1853, likely around Albany, Texas. He served as a child soldier during the American Civil War, protecting frontier settlements from Comanche raids while the older rebels engaged the Union Army.

After the Comanche Wars, Reynolds participated in the cattle drives from Texas to Kansas until being elected sheriff of Throckmorton County in 1885. His election was at least partly due to his prominent family, which owned a cattle company near Albany. Around 1887, Reynolds and his family headed across the Southwest, driving 3,000 head of cattle and 200 horses to Bowie Station in Arizona Territory. He then took his portion of the livestock and settled at a ranch in Pleasant Valley, a troubled region in a time known as the Tonto Basin War between feuding settlers. During this time, Edwin Tewksbury accused Reynolds of killing Al Rose on November 1, 1887, with a shotgun. Rose was killed by eight or nine men wearing masks and overcoats at the Houdon Ranch, one of three owned by the Graham family. The county coroner later said that wounds on Rose's face appeared to have been caused by buckshot. When the situation in Pleasant Valley became intolerable, Reynolds moved his family to Globe, where he was elected sheriff in November 1888.

In 1889, a group of prisoners at Globe had to be transported to Yuma Territorial Prison, including the Apache Kid, Pas-Lau-Tau, and other participants in the 1887 mutiny at San Carlos; as well as a Mexican horse thief named Jesus Avott. The first part of the journey required a stagecoach ride to Casa Grande, where the prisoners would board a train for Yuma. Reynolds was ordered to command the procession, with Sheriff William A. Holmes and coach driver Eugene Middleton as a company. On November 1, 1889, Reynolds left Globe for Casa Grande. The party stopped at Kelvin, Arizona, on the Gila River, for the first night, and then set out for Casa Grande early the next morning. Due to concerns that an incline along the road, known as Kelvin Grade, would be too steep for the horses to pull a wagon full of prisoners up, Reynolds decided that when they reached the grade, the prisoners would be taken out of the coach and marched up on foot. All of the prisoners were wearing handcuffs, and each pair was attached to one another. Only Avott was by himself. The Apache Kid and one other man were considered too dangerous for this, so they were left inside.

When the party reached Kelvin Grade, the lawmen did as planned. Reynolds directed Middleton to take the coach on ahead of the prisoners and keep an eye on the Kid, while he and Holmes watch the remaining prisoners. At a sharp turn in the trail, the Apaches executed their escape. Two of the chained renegades attacked Reynolds and another two attacked Holmes. In the struggle, Pas-Lau-Tau seized a rifle from one of the guards and shot Reynolds, killing him. In the turmoil, Holmes died of a heart attack and Middleton, in attempting to keep the Apache Kid from escaping, was shot. Avott hid in a bush, but when the Apaches ran off, Avott alerted the authorities, for which he was pardoned. The bullet that hit Middleton went through his mouth and out the back of his neck, but he survived. After Avott alerted a local rancher, who gave him a horse to ride, Middleton regained enough strength to walk back to Kelvin, when he found that climbing on top of his coach or a horse was impossible.

The Apaches robbed Reynolds and the others before they left, and the Apache Kid even saved Middleton's life when another renegade wanted to crush the driver's head with a rock. The weather was cold that day, so Reynolds was wearing a coat and gloves. The coat hindered Reynolds from getting to his pistol when he needed to, and the gloves prevented the Apaches from stealing his gold ring. The ring was later given to Reynolds' wife when he was buried in Globe, next to his son, who had died sometime before.

After the murders, the United States Army launched a campaign to catch the fugitives, and by October 1890, all were caught except the Apache Kid. Also that year, Mexican rurales killed an old renegade somewhere in northern Mexico. Reynold's pistol and watch were found on the Apache and later turned over to his family.

== See also ==
- Apache Wars
- Massai
