= Pas-Lau-Tau =

19th-century Apache army scout and outlaw

- Died: March 1890
- Occupation: Army scout
- Known for: Cohort of the Apache Kid

Pas-Lau-Tau (died March 1890), also known as "Pash-ten-tah" and "Bach-e-on-nal", was a 19th-century Apache army scout.

== Background ==
Pas-Lau-Tau's date and place of birth are unknown, though he was likely from the San Carlos Reservation. He had one full brother, who later came to be known as "Paul Patton".

It is unknown at what time Pas-Lau-Tau became associated with or enlisted in the United States Army.

== Biography ==
=== San Carlos firefight ===
Pas-Lau-Tau was an comrade of Haskay-bay-nay-ntayl, an Apache scout in the US Army better known as the "Apache Kid" or simply "Kid". In 1887, Kid had been left in charge of Fort Apache when his father was murdered by another scout, Gon-zizzie. To exact revenge on the killer, he and some comrades deserted their posts for five days to track down and kill Gon-zizzie as well as his brother, Rip, who had murdered Kid's grandfather six months earlier.

At around 17:00 on 1 June 1887, Pas-Lau-Tau joined Kid and four or five others at the San Carlos Reservation, where they would attempt to turn themselves in for the murders of the two scouts. Captain Francis C. Pierce offered a one-word reply: "calaboose", meaning he wanted them to turn themselves in at the San Carlos guardhouse. Antonio Diaz, another scout, embellished the captain's orders and threatened that the entire group would be sent to Florida as prisoners. Rather than surrender, one of Kid's comrades fired one or two shots with his rifle and kicked off a brief firefight which ended in them fleeing the reservation as two cavalry companies pursued them until nightfall.

Al Sieber, a white scout, was shot in the left ankle amid the fighting. Although some accounts alleged that Kid shot Sieber, Sieber himself disputed this as both of them had been unarmed. In an interview with biographer Dan Williamson on 22 February 1939, Pas-Lau-Tau was accused of being the one who fired on Sieber by Paul Patton, his own brother.

Pas-Lau-Tau and the rest of Kid's group followed the San Pedro River until they were just barely north of the US-Mexico border, but abandoned their retreat and five of them surrendered to US forces on 22 June to be tried by court martial. All were convicted and sentenced to death by firing squad for mutiny and desertion, but this was reduced to ten years in prison by General Nelson A. Miles. They were transported to Fort Alcatraz where they served sixteen months before their sentences were remitted by Secretary of War William Crowninshield Endicott on 29 October 1888 due to the prejudices of the jury, the severity of the sentences, and the likelihood that it was Diaz who had instigated the conflict. Four of the five convicts - including Pas-Lau-Tau - were returned to San Carlos, where they were welcomed back by the 10th Cavalry Regiment band.

=== Kelvin Grade massacre ===
Infuriated that Pas-Lau-Tau and the other convicts had been freed, friends of Al Sieber stoked outrage in the community and demanded they be tried by a civilian court. An 1888 ruling by the Supreme Court of the United States determined that the territorial courts in Arizona had the right to convict Apache persons for capital crimes, and had released prisoners convicted of such offences under federal courts. Regardless of whether or not this ruling actually put Pas-Lau-Tau, the Apache Kid, and their fellow defendants under the jurisdiction of a civil court, petitioners campaigned to have the men retried. Pas-Lau-Tau and Say-es were arrested on 14 October 1889 by Captain John Bullis and Sieber; Kid was arrested several days later by a deputy who had disguised himself as a cowboy. During the trial, Pas-Lau-Tau identified himself as "Bach-e-on-al", but was tried under the name "Pash-ten-tah". They were retried for the attack on Sieber's life and sentenced on 23 October to seven years in the Yuma Territorial Prison. At this time, the only known photographs of Pas-Lau-Tau and his accomplices were taken.

Following their convictions, the four men were to be transported to Yuma aboard a stagecoach driven by Eugene Middleton and escorted by Sheriff Glenn Reynolds. Reynolds asked William A. "Hunkydory" Holmes to assist him on the trip, as his more regular deputy Tom Horn was in Phoenix for the weekend. Sieber asked that either he or a company of his scouts be allowed to accompany the procession but was refused by Reynolds, who was later said to have told Sieber: "I don't need your scouts, I can take those Indians alone with a corn-cob and a lightning bug". Jesus Avott, another prisoner, was also to be taken to Yuma to serve one year for horse theft.

After leaving Globe for Casa Grande on 1 November 1889, the stagecoach stopped overnight at Riverside Station in Kelvin before the final day of travel to the Casa Grande train station, where they would catch the 16:00 train to the prison. On the journey, Holmes read the prisoners some of his original poetry. Around dawn on 2 November, they reached a sandy ascent in the Tortilla Mountains known as the "Kelvin Grade". Seven passengers - including Pas-Lau-Tau, Avott, three other prisoners, and the two guards - were forced to disembark so that the wagon could overcome the hill, while two prisoners - including Kid - remained on board. Handcuffed two-and-two, the prisoners were forced to march behind the rest of their caravan, eventually losing sight of it. In what would come to be called the "Kelvin Grade massacre", Pas-Lau-Tau and another prisoner overpowered Holmes while the other two prisoners behind them did the same to Reynolds. Seizing his captor's weapon, Pas-Lau-Tau shot and killed Reynolds; the trauma of the incident caused Holmes to suffer a fatal heart attack. Middleton, who had stopped up ahead to rest the horses and wait for the others to catch up, heard the shot but remained in place, unconcerned because he had heard Reynolds target shooting earlier.

No longer guarded, Pas-Lau-Tau took the keys from Reynolds's pocket and freed the other prisoners. Avott, who had no affiliation with the crew, ran ahead to warn Middleton that the guards were dead, prompting the driver to draw his pistol and aim it at Kid. Pas-Lau-Tau caught up with the wagon before Middleton could fire and drew up on the other side of the vehicle. When the rifle was cocked, Middleton looked to see the rifle and was shot through the mouth and neck, missing his teeth and spinal cord. Middleton fell to the ground, alive and conscious but unmoving. The group stole his overcoat, loosed the horses, and fled eastward, armed with the rifles and revolvers they'd taken from the guards.

Avott brought news of the jailbreak to Florence and requested aid for Middleton, an act that would see him pardoned for his earlier crime. However, Middleton began walking down the road before Avott returned and was met by Shorty Saylor, a fellow coach driver who rode on to Globe using Reynolds's horse. From there, Saylor telegraphed Sieber to notify him of the escape. Sieber organized a twenty-person team led by Lieutenant James Waterman Watson to search for the convicts, and soldiers from every army outpost in Arizona joined in the search. However, a snowstorm occurred at Kelvin Grade shortly after the incident, burying the escapees' tracks and preventing authorities from pursuing them.

Pas-Lau-Tau was spotted on the San Carlos River with Kid on 5 November, but could not be captured. The same day, it was discovered that both men's wives had gone missing, and reward of $500 was offered to anyone who could apprehend one or more of the escapees.

=== Bronco Apache ===
The gang carried out raids against frontier settlements to survive. A $6,000 bounty was placed on their leader demanding he be brought in dead or alive, and multiple military officers were ordered to patrol the region in order to kill or capture the outlaws, but these efforts failed.

At the time, the area was home to the bronco Apache, a displaced group of Chiricahua people who had come into being when they fled south of the US-Mexico border to avoid persecution by the United States. A group of Chiricahua warriors broke from the army led by Geronimo in 1886, refusing to make peace with the United States Army, and joined the bronco Apache. The bronco Apache remained in the Sierra Madre Occidental mountains for decades, raiding on both sides of the border and never surrendering. Pas-Lau-Tau and the other escapees were among those who joined the bronco Apache at this time.

=== Death ===
As the group of outlaws continued to raid the countryside, an army detachment led by Lieutenant James Waterman Watson and a number of Apache scouts tracked Pas-Lau-Tau and the others to a camp on the Salt River. The group fled to the Gila River and fought with the pursuing military on 7 or 11 March 1890. Hale and two others were killed in the battle. Although Pas-Lau-Tau survived the fighting, he was mortally wounded when shot by a bullet fired by Sergeant of Scouts Rowdy, who would be awarded the Medal of Honor for his service in this battle. Pas-Lau-Tau died as a result of his injuries sometime after the fighting ended.

Josh, one of the Apache scouts instrumental in tracking down the outlaws, decapitated Pas-Lau-Tau and exhibited his head on a spike at the San Carlos Reservation. The Apache Kid was present at the firefight, but escaped; sightings of him would continue until 1899, and he was never captured.

Contemporary accounts suggest that Captain Carter Johnson also took credit for killing Pas-Lau-Tau, alleging that he did so in a July 1890 battle against five Apache soldiers, including Say-es, "some thirty-five miles northeast of San Carlos near Gila Peak and Ash Creek"; later versions of this story suggest it was another Kelvin Grade escapee, El-cahn, who was killed. 20th-century historian Jess G. Hayes suggested the date of the Gila River battle actually occurred in May 1890.

== See also ==
- List of Old West gunfighters
