= Masai (name) =

Masai is a name of Kenyan origin that may refer to:

== Given name ==
- Masai Russell (born 2000), American sprinter and hurdler
- Masai Ujiri (born 1970), English-born Nigerian basketball executive and former basketball player

== Surname ==
- Alex Masai (born 1997), Kenyan long-distance runner
- Andrew Masai (born 1960), Kenyan long-distance runner
- Edith Masai (born 1967), Kenyan long-distance runner and three-time World Cross Country champion
- Hikaru Masai or Hikaru (born 1987), Japanese pop singer
- Linet Masai (born 1989), Kenyan long-distance runner and 2009 world champion
- Moses Ndiema Masai (born 1986), Kenyan long-distance runner and world medallist, brother of Linet
- Samwel Chebolei Masai (born 2001), Kenyan middle-distance runner

== See also ==
- Barmasai, a related Kenyan name meaning "one who has killed or captured a Masai"
