= Apache (film) =

1954 film by Robert Aldrich

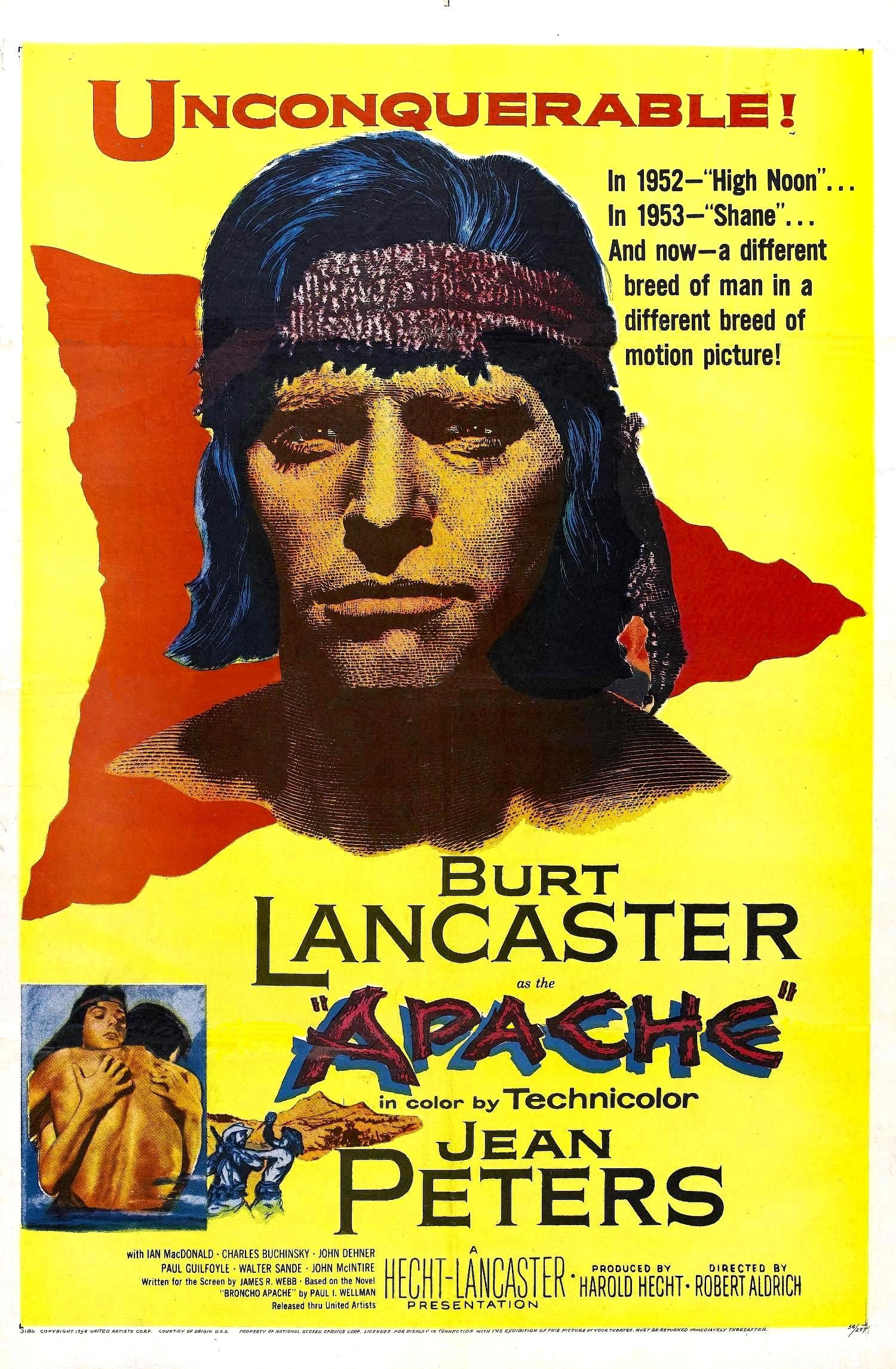
- Theatrical release poster
- Directed by: Robert Aldrich
- Screenplay by: James R. Webb
- Based on: novel Broncho Apache by Paul Wellman
- Produced by: Harold Hecht
- Starring: Burt Lancaster; Jean Peters; John McIntire
- Cinematography: Ernest Laszlo
- Edited by: Alan Crosland Jr.
- Music by: David Raksin
- Production companies: Hecht-Lancaster Productions; Linden Productions
- Distributed by: United Artists
- Release date: July 9, 1954
- Running time: 87 minutes
- Country: United States
- Language: English
- Budget: $1,240,000 or $1 million
- Box office: $10 million (US/Canada); 1.2 million tickets (France)

Apache is a 1954 American Western film directed by Robert Aldrich and starring Burt Lancaster, Jean Peters and John McIntire. The film was based on the novel Broncho Apache by Paul Wellman, which was published in 1936. It was Aldrich's first color film.

== Plot ==
Following the surrender of the great leader Geronimo, Massai — the last Apache warrior — is captured and sent on a prison train to a reservation in Florida. But he manages to escape and heads back to his homeland to win back his woman and settle down to grow crops. His pursuers have other ideas, though.

== Cast ==
- Burt Lancaster as Massai
- Jean Peters as Nalinle
- John McIntire as Al Sieber
- Charles Bronson (credited as Charles Buchinsky) as Hondo
- John Dehner as Weddle
- Paul Guilfoyle as Santos
- Ian MacDonald as Clagg
- Walter Sande as Lieutenant Colonel Beck
- Morris Ankrum as Dawson
- Monte Blue as Geronimo
- Paul E. Burns as general store proprietor

== Production ==
In April 1952 Burt Lancaster announced he would star in a film based on the novel, to be produced by himself and Harold Hecht. Lancaster had previously played an American Indian in Jim Thorpe – All-American. Both Lancaster and his love interest, played by Jean Peters, appeared in brownface in the film.

In June 1953, Lancaster and Hecht announced they would make two films with United Artists, starting with Apache. The film would be the first in a series of movies Lancaster made for United Artists. It was originally budgeted at $742,000.

In July 1953 the producers hired Robert Aldrich as a director. Aldrich says this was on the back of his second feature as director, World for Ransom, along with the fact that he had previously worked for Hecht-Lancaster on other movies as an assistant and had tried to buy the original novel himself.

The ending of the novel featured the leading character killed by US troops. "Of course, United Artists and Hecht became apprehensive of that so called down-beat ending," said Aldrich. "I made noise but they didn't hear me; then you go through the steps but you know they're going to use that happy ending."

=== Shooting ===
Filming started October 19, 1953, in Sonora, after a week of rehearsal. Lancaster tore a ligament while filming a horse scene on the film. He returned to filming relatively quickly.

== Reception ==
=== Box office ===
The film was a big hit, earning over $3 million in theatrical rentals during its first year of release and $6 million in overall North American rentals. Aldrich subsequently directed Hecht-Lancaster's next film, Vera Cruz.

The film earned $3.25 million in American and Canadian rentals during 1954, and it went on to generate total gross receipts of $10 million in the United States and Canada. In France, the film sold 1,216,098 tickets at the box office.

=== Critical ===
On the review aggregator website Rotten Tomatoes, 64% of 11 critics' reviews are positive, with an average rating of 5.5/10. At the time, Clyde Gilmour praised the film as "one of the most exciting and entertaining westerns Hollywood has produced," while the New York Times criticized it as "slow and dull." Retrospective reviews have praised the film for its "acceptance of the alien nature of the Apache" and "more than the standard revisionist bromides."

== See also ==
- Winnetou
- Whitewashing in film
