= Masai Plateau =

- मसाई पठार
- Location within Maharashtra
- Location: Kolhapur, Maharashtra, India
- Nearest city: Kolhapur, Ichalkaranji,
- Coordinates: 16°50′2.26″N 74°04′50.32″E
- Area: 10 km^{2} (3.9 mi^{2})
- Governing body: Ministry of Environment and Forests, Government of India

The Masai Plateau, also known as the Masai Pathar or Masai Sadas, is a plateau situated 30 kilometers west from Kolhapur city in Maharashtra.

It is known for scenery and various types of seasonal wildflowers that bloom in the months of August and September. The plateau is situated at an altitude of 900 AMSL and is approximately 1.5 square kilometers in area. Masai plateau has diversity of flowering plants. These include orchids, and carnivorous plants such as Utricularia and Drosera indica.
