= MAASAI =

Swedish music duo

- Origin: Stockholm, Sweden
- Genres: Cinematic pop
- Years active: 2010–present
- Labels: Hybris
- Members: Dominique Teymouri; Zackarias Ekelund
- Website: wearemaasai.com

MAASAI is a Swedish music duo from Stockholm, formed in 2010. It consists of Dominique Teymouri (vocals) and Zackarias Ekelund (drums).

== Members ==
- Dominique Teymouri
- Zackarias Ekelund

== Discography ==
=== Singles ===
- Memories (2013)
- The Healer (2013)
- Forgive Me (2014)

=== Extended plays ===
- Frida Sundemo - Snow, MAASAI Remake (2012)
