= Barmasai =

Barmasai is a name of Kenyan origin, meaning "one who killed or captured a Masai. It may refer to:

- Bernard Barmasai (born 1974), Kenyan steeplechase runner and former world record holder
- David Barmasai Tumo (born 1989), Kenyan marathon runner and winner of the 2011 Dubai Marathon

In Keiyo community Barmasai means 'vow not to go to' (Bar) Maasai Maasai
