= Masaichi =

- Gender: Male

Origin
- Origin: Japanese
- Meaning: Different meanings depending on the kanji used

Masaichi (written: 雅一, 正一, 政一 or 政市) is a masculine Japanese given name. Notable people with the name include:

- Fukushi Masaichi (福士 政一; 1878–1956), Japanese physician and pathologist
- Masaichi Kaneda (金田 正一; 1933–2019), Japanese baseball player
- Masaichi Kondō (近藤 政市; born 1917), Japanese World War II flying ace
- Masaichi Nagata (永田 雅一; 1906–1985), Japanese film producer and baseball executive
- Masaichi Niimi (新見 政一; 1887–1993), Imperial Japanese Navy admiral
