= Al Sieber =

German-American frontier soldier and prospector (1843–1907)

- Born: February 27, 1843; Mingolsheim, Grand Duchy of Baden
- Died: February 19, 1907 (aged 63); Tonto Road, Apache Trail; Arizona Territory, United States
- Burial place: Globe, Arizona
- Military career
- Branch: United States Army; Union Army
- Service years: 1862–1864, 1871–1890
- Rank: Chief of Scouts
- Units: 1st Minnesota Volunteer Infantry; Sixth Cavalry
- Conflicts: American Civil War; Battle of Antietam; Battle of Fredericksburg; Battle of Chancellorsville; Battle of Gettysburg; Apache Wars; Battle of Cibecue Creek; Battle of Big Dry Wash

Al Sieber (February 27, 1843 (Note: 1844 was a leap year, leading to some confusion about Sieber's birth date. His tombstone in Globe gives his birth date as 1844, as does the book Chief of Scouts. Both are incorrect.) – February 19, 1907) was a German-American immigrant who fought in the American Civil War (1861–1865), and in the American Old West frontier against the Native Americans (Indians) in the later American Indian Wars of the mid to late 19th century. He became a prospector and later served as a decorated Chief of Scouts for the United States Army during the subsequent Apache Wars of 1849 – 1886 in the southwestern United States.

== Early life ==
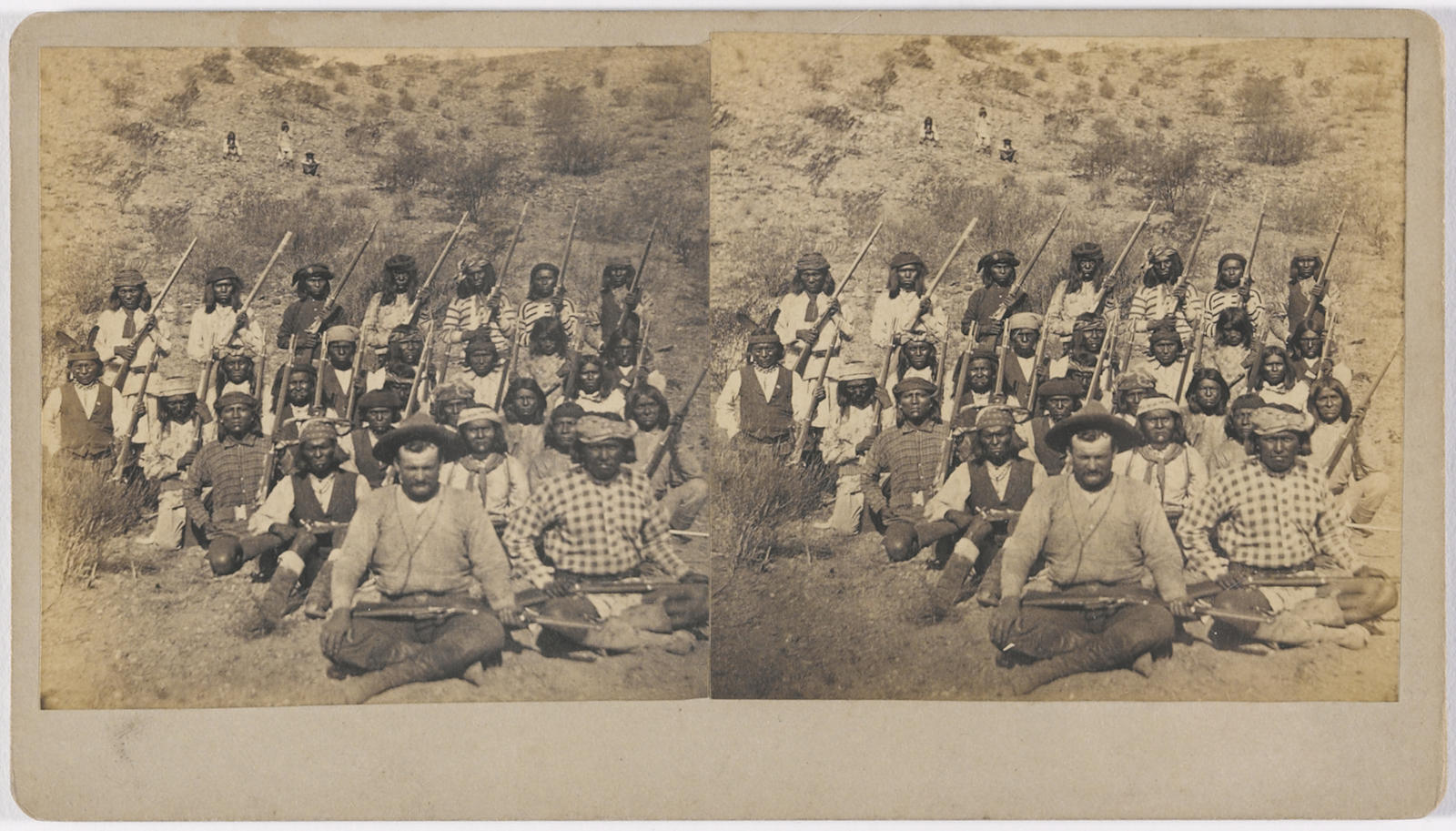
With Apache scouts

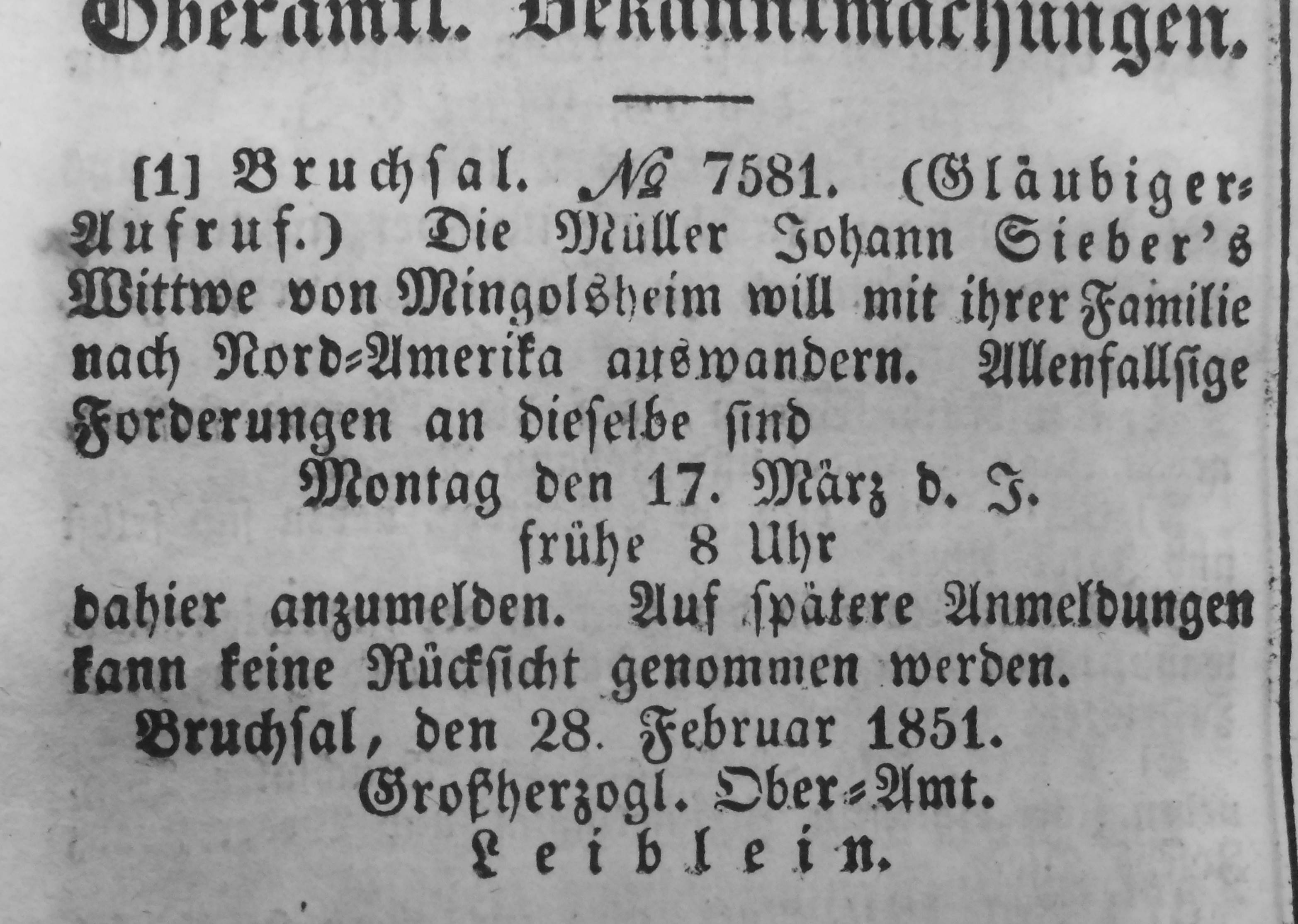
Emigration notice

Albert "Al" Sieber was born in Mingolsheim, Baden as the 13th of 14 children. He was baptized on March 1, 1843, in St. Lambertus Church, Mingolsheim. His father Johannes died on September 16, 1845. Between March and April 1851, three years after the "Badian Revolution", his mother Eva Katharina née Fischer, emigrated with her still living eight children (six had already died) to Lancaster, Pennsylvania. The family moved to Minnesota several years later.

== Civil War service ==
He enlisted on March 4, 1862, in Company B, 1st Minnesota Volunteer Infantry during the American Civil War (1861–1865). Sieber was severely wounded on July 2, 1863 in the Battle of Gettysburg, on the battlefield's westside heights of Cemetery Ridge. He fought in several key engagements, including the earlier Battle of Antietam, (September 1862 in the Maryland campaign, then following Battle of Fredericksburg during the winter of 1862–1863, and Battle of Chancellorsville, (1863), Battle of Gettysburg, (June–July 1863), then the post-war conflicts in the American Indian Wars later phase in the American Southwest territories of the Apache Wars, (1849 to 1886), with the Battle of Cibecue Creek (August 1881), and Battle of Big Dry Wash (July 1882). After the wars, he became a mineral prospector in California, Nevada, and in the old Arizona Territory, where he also managed a cattle ranch from 1868 to 1871.

== Army scout and guide ==
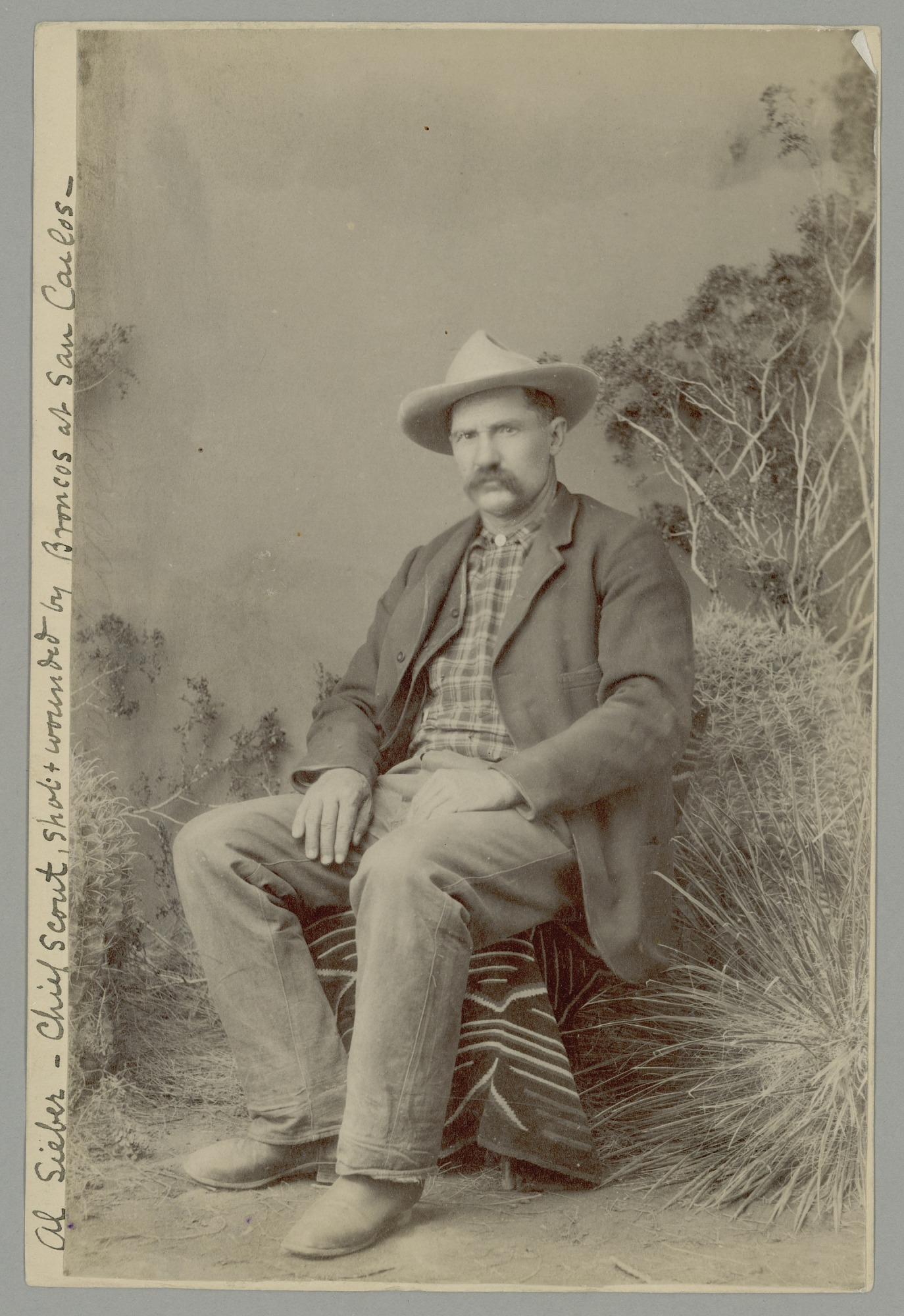
Al Sieber Chief of Scouts

In July 1871, U.S. Army General George Stoneman (1822–1892), hired Sieber as Chief of Scouts and he served for much of the Apache Wars. He participated in General George Crook's Tonto (Apache) campaign (1871–1873). When the Camp Verde, Arizona Territory Indian reservation was closed, Sieber was told to move Yavapais and Tonto Apaches to the San Carlos Reservation in the middle of winter. He remained employed there and participated in several engagements with Apache groups that had abandoned and left the reservation.

On October 24, 1874, the Arizona Miner newspaper (in Prescott of northern Arizona Territory), reported, "Al Zieber, Sergeant Stauffer and a mixed command of white and red soldiers are in the hills of Verde looking for some erring Apaches, whom they will be apt to find." Three days later, Sieber and Sgt. Rudolph Stauffer found the Apaches that had escaped the reservation at Cave Creek and fought them. Josephine ("Sadie") Marcus Earp (1861–1944, future wife of famed lawman Wyatt Earp (1848–1929), wrote that when she arrived in the Arizona Territory, coming to Tombstone, she learned that "some renegade Yuma-Apaches had escaped from the reservation to which they had been consigned and had returned to their old haunts on the war-path" and that Sieber was tracking the escaped Apache. She said Sieber and his scouts led her stagecoach and its passengers to a nearby adobe ranch house where they remained until the Indians were captured.

In February, April, and May 1877, Sieber acted as a guide for Pima County Marshal Wiley Standefer, who was pursuing outlaws in the region.

In 1883, General Crook with a unit of American cavalry went south into the Sierra Madre Mountains of northern Mexico pursuing Apache renegade chief Geronimo (1829-1909), with a band of rebelling Indians in the Geronimo Campaign. Sieber was Crook's lead civilian scout and mentor to Tom Horn, whom he taught to speak German, as well as fighting together during the battles at Cibecue Creek (August 1881), and Big Dry Wash (July 1882). Sieber was in the field but not present when the Apache leader and renegade Geronimo surrendered to young Lt. Charles B. Gatewood (1853-1896), and commanding General Nelson Miles (1839-1925), in September 1886, finally ending the Indian Wars in the old Southwest.

Sieber stayed on at San Carlos as Chief of Scouts for the Army for another 13 years.

== Wounds ==
In 1887, Sieber was shot and wounded when the Apache Kid and his followers escaped the reservation to prevent being jailed again. During his various battles and fights over the course of his life, Sieber received 28 wounds. (Note: "When I met Al Sieber, he carried twenty major knife, lance, arrow and gunshot wounds in his body. When he quit the service ten years later, he had garnered another eight serious scars. Also at that time of discharge or separation, he carried fifty three knife cuts on the butts and stocks of his various guns. He said that twenty eight of these represented those Apaches who had left their marks on him." (Tom Horn))

== Perjury and revenge on the Apache Kid ==
A few days after the Apache Kid surrendered, he was found guilty of mutiny and desertion and sentenced to ten years at the military prison on Alcatraz Island in San Francisco Bay, California. The then U.S. Secretary of War, William Crowninshield Endicott reviewed the court-martial file of the Apache Kid and came to the conclusion that the trial had not been fair. On October 20, 1888, six months after his arrival on Alcatraz, the Apache Kid was released and headed back to San Carlos, Arizona Territory. Unhappy with military law, Sieber decided to retry the Kid, this time for attempted murder in the local territorial court. On October 29, 1889, according to the official records as the star witness, Sieber testified that the Apache Kid had shot him, even though he knew the Kid was not wearing a weapon at that moment. Witnesses saw Curley, another Apache scout, shoot at Sieber, but none were called to testify. Al Sieber's perjury resulted in a sentence of seven years in the infamous Yuma Territorial Prison in Yuma, for the Apache Kid and 3 other scouts.

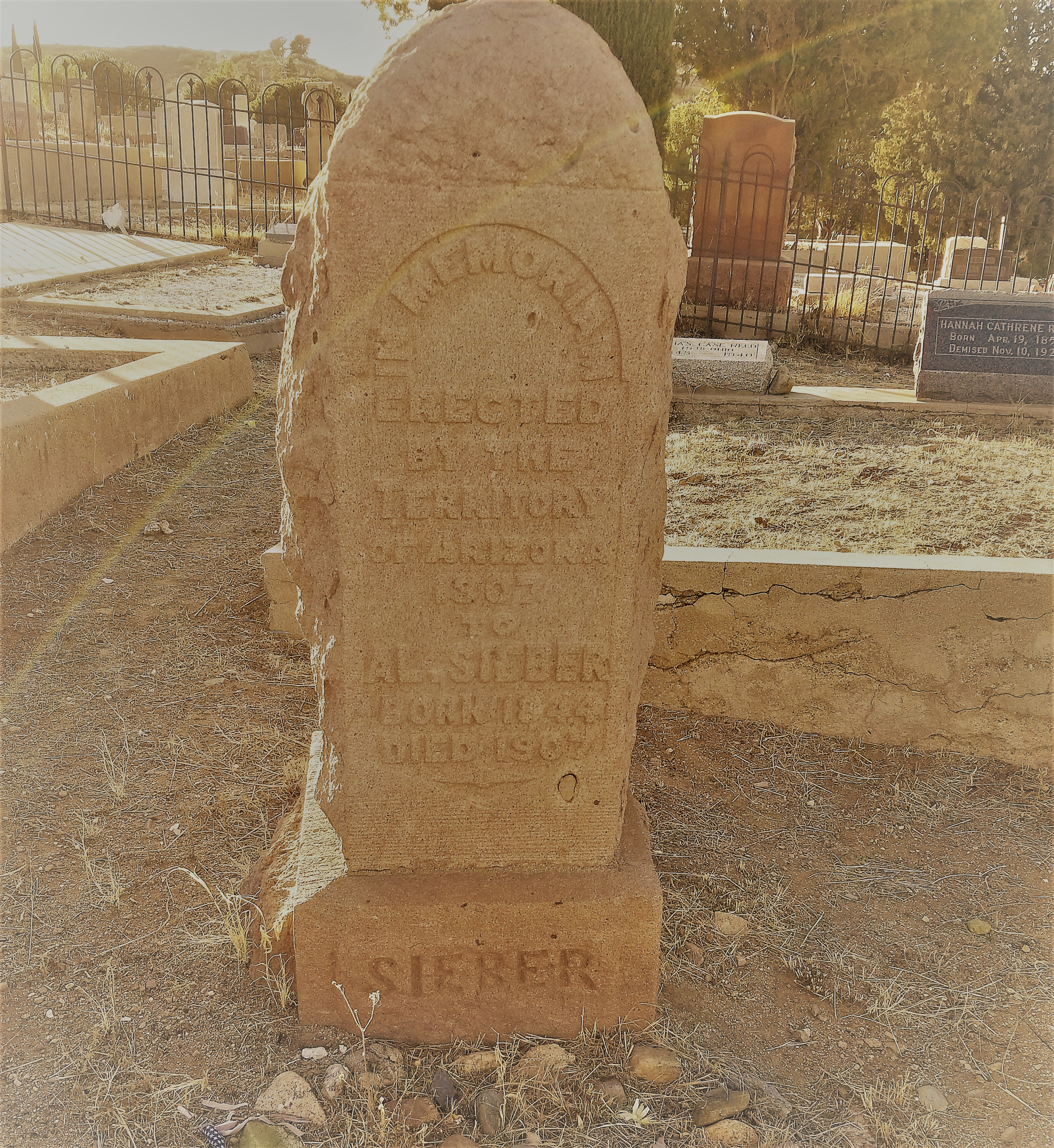

== Post army life and death ==
Sieber was fired from his San Carlos Chief of Scouts position in December 1890 by Major John L. Bullis. He left San Carlos and took up prospecting for the next eight years until 1898.

On February 19, 1907, Sieber was leading an Apache work crew that was building the Tonto road to the new Roosevelt Dam site on the confluence of the Salt River and Tonto Creek on the border of Gila County and Maricopa County in Gila County. The project was under the supervision of another famous frontier scout, "Yellowstone" Luther Kelly at Apache Trail, a separate downstream road, in Maricopa County, Arizona. Sieber was killed when a boulder rolled on him during construction. (Note: In 1907, during construction of the Tonto road, a rocky point was blasted leaving a huge boulder precariously balanced on a small stone. Sieber, who during the frontier warfare had not hesitated to shoot Indians, realized the danger and saved his Apache helpers by knocking out the supporting stone. But his lame leg, twice cracked by rifle balls, hindered his retreat and he was killed by the plunging rock.) He was buried with military honors at the cemetery in Globe, Arizona.

== In film and media ==
Sieber has been portrayed in a number of Hollywood productions and releases of Western feature films, plus television series

- 1953: The character "Ed Bannon" portrayed by Charlton Heston in the film Arrowhead was based on Sieber-
- 1954: John McIntire in the film Apache
- 1955: Kenneth MacDonald in the episode "Apache Kid" from the television series Stories of the Century
- 1967: Willard Sage (as "Al Seiber") in the episode Silver Tombstone from the western TV series Death Valley Days, with Strother Martin as Ed Schieffelin
- 1979: Richard Widmark in the miniseries Mr. Horn
- 1993: Robert Duvall in the film Geronimo: An American Legend

== Footnotes ==
=== References ===
- Bourke, John G. On the Border with Crook. University of Nebraska Press. Lincoln. 1891. ISBN 0-8094-3583-7.

(reprint): Bison Books. 1971. ISBN 0-8032-5741-4.

- Crook, George. General George Crook: His Autobiography. University of Oklahoma Press. 1986. ISBN 0-8061-1982-9.
- Cruse, Thomas. Apache Days and After. University of Oklahoma Press. 1987. ISBN 0-8032-6327-9.
- Cozzens, Peter. Eyewitnesses to the Indian Wars, 1865–1890 (The Struggle for Apacheria). Stackpole Books. 2001. ISBN 0-8117-0572-2.
- Davis, Britton. The Truth About Geronimo. Bison Books. 1976. ISBN 0-8032-5840-2.
- Debo, Angie. Geronimo: The Man, His Time, His Place. University of Oklahoma Press. 1982. ISBN 0-8061-1828-8.
- Field, Ron. US Army Frontier Scouts 1840–1921. Osprey Publishing. 2003. ISBN 1-84176-582-1.
- Gatewood, Charles B. Lt. Charles Gatewood & His Apache Wars Memoir. Bison Books. 2009. ISBN 0-8032-1884-2.
- Goff, John S. Arizona Biographical Dictionary. Black Mountain Press. Cave Creek. 1983.
- Hutton, Paul Andrew. The Apache Wars: The hunt for Geronimo, the Apache Kid, and the captive boy who started the longest war in American history. Broadway Books. New York. 2016. ISBN 978-0-7704-3583-7.
- Lockwood, Frank C. More Arizona Characters. University of Arizona. 1943.
- Roberts, David. Once They Moved Like The Wind; (Cochise, Geronimo, And The Apache Wars). Touchstone. 2005. ISBN 0-671-88556-1.
- Robinson, Charles M. General Crook and the Western Frontier. University of Oklahoma Press. 2001. ISBN 0-8061-3358-9.
- Sabin, Edwin L. General Crook and the Fighting Apaches (1871–1886). Lulu Press. 2008. ISBN 1-4097-1970-7.
- Thrapp, Dan L. Al Sieber: Chief of Scouts. University of Oklahoma Press. Norman. 1964. ISBN 0-8061-2770-8.
- Thrapp, Dan L. The Conquest of Apacheria. University of Oklahoma Press. Norman. 1967. ISBN 0-8061-1286-7.
- Thrapp, Dan L. Encyclopedia of Frontier Biography. Volume III, P–Z. University of Oklahoma Press. (Reprint 1991). ISBN 0-8032-9420-4.
- Traywick, Ben T. Legendary Characters of Southeast Arizona. Red Marie's. Tombstone. 1992.
