= Battle of Cibecue Creek =

1881 battle during the Apache Wars

- Part of Geronimo's War, Apache Wars
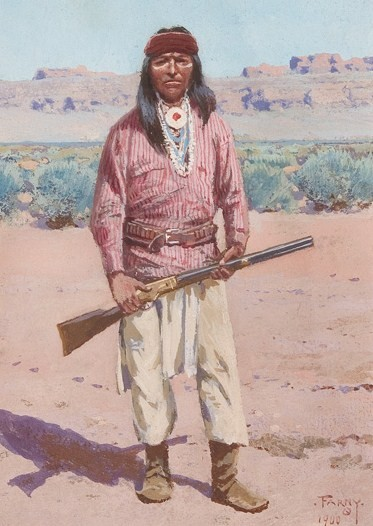
- An Apache warrior by William F. Farny
Date	August 30, 1881
Location	Cibecue Creek, Fort Apache Indian Reservation, Arizona Territory
Result	Apache strategic victory, United States tactical victory.

Belligerents
United States	Apache

Commanders and leaders
(United States) Eugene Asa Carr	Nock-ay-det-klinne †

Strength
86 cavalry	~125 warriors

Casualties and losses
8 killed 2 wounded	18 killed

The Battle of Cibecue Creek was an engagement of the Apache Wars, fought in August 1881 between the United States and White Mountain Apaches in Arizona, at Cibecue Creek on the Fort Apache Indian Reservation. After an army expedition of scouts, U.S. Army soldiers 'arrested' a prominent Cibecue Apache medicine man named Nock-ay-det-klinne. The U.S. Army soldiers were taking Nock-ay-det-klinné back to the fort when they were ambushed by Apache warriors. During the conflict, the U.S. Army soldiers killed Nock-ay-det-klinné. Most of the 23 Apache scouts mutinied, in the largest such action of its kind in U.S. history. The soldiers retreated to Fort Apache. The following day, the White Mountain Apache mounted a counter-attack. The events sparked general unrest and led to White Mountain Apache warriors leaving the Fort Apache Indian Reservation to join forces with the Apache leader of the Bedonkohe band of Chiricahua Apache named Goyąąłé (Wise man), better known as Geronimo.

== Background ==
Nock-ay-det-klinne was a respected Cibecue Apache medicine man and was chief of the Cañon Creek band of the Cibecue Apache, a group of the Western Apache. He often counseled leading warriors such as Cochise and Geronimo. Due to corruption and unhealthy conditions at the Fort Apache Indian Reservation in eastern Arizona, Nock-ay-det-klinne began holding ceremonies known as ghost dances at the village of Cibecue. It was part of a late-19th-century spiritual revival among Native Americans struggling to deal with the disruption of their societies as they were pushed onto reservations. The ceremonies often included heavy drinking and the use of hallucinogenic plants, such as peyote. Through them, the Apache expressed and united under their discontent with conditions of reservation life. The American settlers of the region grew alarmed about the dances, which they thought were related to preparations for war. The Army came to investigate the situation and remove the medicine man from his followers.

The soldiers stationed at Fort Apache included Troops D and E, 6th Cavalry; Company D, 12th Infantry; and Company A, Indian scouts. Captain Edmund Clarence Hentig was transferred to Fort Apache in 1876. He was the captain and commanded company D. Second Lieutenant Thomas Cruse commanded Company A. Of his 25 scouts, 12 were from Chief Pedro's band and 13 were Cibecue Apache; Nock-ay-det-klinne was one of their own chiefs and medicine men. With the permission of the military, the scouts serving with the troops often attended Nock-ay-det-klinne's dances near Fort Apache.

Cruse later wrote,

After the medicine dances began around the post, I noticed a change. Generally, they [the scouts] are very ready to communicate anything they know or may have seen, but after these dances, they became very uncommunicative and would not tell anything that was going on among the other Indians or among themselves. One morning, the rumor was brought to me that they had told the engineer at the saw mill that they were going to clean out the post and have it for themselves. I could not find out who made the remark from the scouts on inquiry. Formerly, they had hung about the men's kitchens and quarters and would talk about themselves and their chiefs and all matters, but after these dances, they became changed to such an extent that all noticed it. On asking them, however, I could obtain no information.

Around August 10, Colonel Eugene Asa Carr asked Cruse for his opinion of the loyalty of the scouts. Cruse replied, "he entirely distrusted his scouts in event of the rising of the White Mountains [Apache] and believed all or nearly all would go with the enemy and recommended their discharge." Cruse had noticed their changes in attitude and conduct. He also told Carr that the main participants in any local uprising would be friends and relatives of the scouts, and even if the scouts did not turn against the military, they would be of no use in conflict. Most officers at the post and Sam Bowman had the same opinion.

On August 13, Carr telegraphed the departmental headquarters:

It is the general impression here that the men of the Indian scout company will go with their friends if they break out. Please give me authority to discharge them or such of them as I may believe unreliable and enlist reliable ones in their places.

Permission was granted for the discharge, but the telegraph line went down before Carr received it. He did not hear from the department for two and a half weeks, after his troops and he had returned from being ambushed at the Cibecue.

Routinely every Sunday morning, the officers inspected the scout company. Carr directed Cruse to take the scouts' guns after the August 14 inspection. Cruse was to tell the scouts that he would keep their arms in his office to protect them from the rain. The guns were regularly kept in the orderly room; the officers issued them only to men on herd duty, soldiers and scouts sent out on detached service, and to all men on Saturday evenings for Sunday morning inspections. The scouts took the removal of the guns as a sign of distrust, but Cruse tried to have the interpreter smooth the matter over, and thought they were satisfied.

Carr decided to take his cavalry and Cruse's scouts to the Cibecue and leave the infantry at Fort Apache. He did not feel comfortable bringing the scouts, but had little choice. Later, he said, "I had to take the chances. They were enlisted men of my command, for duty; and I could not have found the medicine man without them. I deemed it better also if they should prove unfaithful it should not occur at the post [where there were officers' families, white civilians, and government property]."

On Sunday morning, August 28, shortly after the scout Chapeau returned to Fort Apache without Nock-ay-det-klinne, Carr told Cruse to let the scouts keep their guns after their inspection and to prepare to leave the next morning to arrest the medicine man. John Byrnes, a Dublin-born Irishman assigned to Company A, knew of the respect the Apache scouts had for Nock-ay-det-klinne and was alarmed. Byrnes warned Cruse that the scouts should not be armed, as they could not be trusted. Byrnes had earlier counseled Carr against permitting the scouts to keep their guns. Cruse told Byrnes he was acting under Carr's orders.

=== Leaving Fort Apache ===
About 10:00 am the next day, Carr left Fort Apache with five officers, 79 enlisted soldiers from Troops D and E, 6th Cavalry, and 23 scouts from Company A, to make the arrest. Cruse took Byrnes as his guide. Carr also took Charles Hurrle, interpreter; Charles "Nat" Nobles, chief packer; one cargador, the principal assistant to the chief packer; four packers; and Clark Carr the ten year old son of the commander. Sixty soldiers, mostly of Company D, 12th Infantry, and several civilians remained at Fort Apache, with Major Cochran in command of the post. Just before they left. Carr scribbled a message for General Willcox: "I sent word to Nock-ay-det-klinne that l wanted to see him. He does not seem likely to come and I am searching for his place on Cibicue to try to catch him." Because the telegraph line was down, Willcox did not receive the message until three days later. It was not generally known that an expedition to Nock-ay-det-klinne's camp was planned. Carr had been secretive about the purpose and destination of the march. The scouts were not told which way to go until the force was moving out. After they were notified they were going out on a march, the scouts suspected the destination was the Cibecue.

After the column crossed the White River, just outside Fort Apache, and reached the mesa on the other side, some Apaches living along the river rode up and spoke to the scouts. Carr called these natives and the scouts together and told them where the command was going and what he was going to do. He said he was not going to hurt Nock-ay-det-klinne, but wanted him to come in with him. He told the curious natives to go and tell their friends not to be alarmed, as he was not going to bother them and there would be no trouble. Stanton was ordered out on a scout under Colonel Eugene A. Carr, directed to go to Cibecue Creek and arrest the medicine man. The command arrested the Indian, then camped for the night on Cibecue Creek, despite the general excitement the operation had aroused among Apache followers of the medicine man.

Carr took the Verde Trail to the Cibecue. Although this was the shortest route, the trail was rough, passing through mountainous country covered mostly with timber. The trail may have been boggy at places, but the region was then in the third day of a nine-day period without rain. On the first day, Carr and his battalion traveled about 29 miles. They were winding through deep canyons with rocky sides. They camped for the night in a canyon where the trail crossed Carrizo Creek. That evening, after supper, Carr issued each scout 20 rounds of ammunition.

I called them around my tent and had a long talk with them. Told them I had sent for the medicine man to talk to him about the reports that he had said the whites would leave the country when the corn was ripe and etc. Mose [1st Sergeant of Company A] manfully defended his friend, but finally gave in to the idea that when there is a misunderstanding between friends they should talk it over. He then volunteered to go in advance and tell Nock-ay-det-klinne what was the object of the expedition. I told him he could do as he pleased; that I had sent once for the medicine man and he did not come, and now I was going to bring him; that I was not going to hurt him, but to show him that he must come when sent for. That if he had not said these things, he would be released at once; but that if he had, he and the Indians must be made to understand that they were not true – The whites were going to stay and etc. I then showed them the comet through my glass. Nock-ay-det-klinne had told me July 15th in reply to a question on the previous comet, that he had raised that comet. Perhaps these Indians thought that this was my comet. ... I had also told him [Mose] and all the scouts to tell all the Indians they should meet, that my only mission was to get Nock-ay-det-klinne and that he would not be hurt and no others would be interfered with.

=== Ambush avoided ===
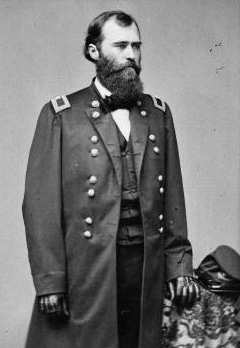
Eugene Asa Carr

About one and a half miles from the Cibecue and three miles from Nock-ay-det-klinne's village, a trail branched from the Verde Trail. This secondary trail ran diagonally up the valley, across high, open ground, through a grassy slope that stretched from the hills to the timber along the Cibecue. It was the shorter route to Nock-ay-det-klinne's village. From this fork, the Verde Trail crossed rocky and rolling country directly to Cibecue Creek. The place where it crossed the creek was known as the Verde Crossing.

On the other side of the creek, another secondary trail ran up the creek, just outside the bushes and undergrowth of the creek bottom, to Nock-ay-det-klinne's lodge. In this area, cornfields were scattered about in the creek bottom. Where the Indians had not cleared the bottom for cultivation, there was brush. In many places, it was thick. The banks of the creek, which were sometimes steep, extended 10 to 12 feet above the creek bottom, on top of which was an open plain with a scattering of junipers, but no heavy timber or thick bushes. Carr later described the creek as "a small mountain stream, across which you can jump in many places, and step in some; and the brushy bottom does not average one hundred yards in width."

About one or two o'clock in the afternoon, Cruse, Byrnes, and the scouts reached the fork. The Apache scouts urged Cruse to take the Verde Trail. John Byrnes, the troop's guide, who was suspicious of the scouts, cautioned Cruse to be wary. Cruse decided to wait until Carr's approach, but before Carr arrived, Cruse changed his mind and started his command along the Verde Trail. When Carr reached the fork, he realized Cruse had taken the longer route, having learned the previous night from Mose that Nock-ay-det-klinne lived two or three miles above the Verde Crossing. Carr had thought the Indian scouts just wanted to stay on the Verde Trail to get to water more quickly. He did not know they had stopped to drink when they passed water about two miles back.

Rather than take the longer route, Carr sent Hurrle to tell Cruse and his men to take the trail to the right. Cruse's troop had gone about a third of a mile past the fork when Hurrle reached them and gave Cruse the message. The group switched to the other trail. The scouts seemed dismayed, leading Byrnes to speculate to Cruse that the scouts had been leading the troop into an ambush. Cruse later wrote, "When we started off to go on the other trail they [the scouts] exhibited a good deal of symptoms of anger and one or two of my company said they were very angry because we did not go the other trail." Cruse did not report their dissatisfaction to Carr. Several officers, who studied the situation, later agreed with Byrnes that the scouts had been trying to lead the force into an ambush that the White Mountain Apaches had set up along the creek bottom.

Carr had been more concerned with looking for a place to make camp later in the afternoon after he made his arrest. He thought the open area just ahead, next to the creek and just north of the Verde Crossing, would make a good campsite. Before the command changed its direction, no Apaches, other than the scouts, were in sight. Once it did, natives started to come out of the creek bottom in groups of two or three. Most headed toward Nock-ay-det-klinne's village.

When the command was about two miles from the village, the leader of the Carrizo Creek band of the Cibecue Apaches, Sanchez (called by the Apaches: Bé-cbiɣo'dn – "Metal Tooth" or "Iron Tooth"), whose band of about 250 people lived on Carrizo Creek, 12 miles north of Carrizo Crossing, came up from the creek bottom. He was unarmed and riding a white pony. His face was painted red, but that was an ordinary occurrence. Indians frequently came into Fort Apache with painted faces. Sanchez shook hands with Carr and told Hurrle that he was going home. He rode to the rear of the column and then back to the creek bottom. Later, when Carr's officers and key civilians thought back on the events, they believed Sanchez was counting the soldiers when he rode down their column. As Sanchez rode back to the creek bottom, Hurrle told Carr that he was not heading in the right direction to go to his home. Carr then looked back and saw him riding toward the bottom. Carr thought he might be returning to the creek bottom to get some of his family or friends. In any event, Carr did not want to show the natives any signs of distrust.

Before the command reached the Cibecue, they stopped on a little knoll to rest. They were about a mile from Nock-ay-det-klinne's camp. As the command approached the point where the trail crossed the Cibecue, the scouts asked Carr to stop and camp before crossing the creek. They said the grass was better on this side and there were cornfields across the creek; the scouts did not want the command's horses and mules to eat the Apaches' corn. Carr responded that he had come a long distance to get Nock-ay-det-klinne before setting up camp. The command continued onward, directed by Chapeau.

=== Arrest of Nock-ay-det-klinne ===
After crossing the stream, which was not quite belly deep, the force moved the short distance to Nock-ay-det-klinne's village. From their approach, the village sat on a low mesa, about 20 feet above the creek bottom and 8 to 10 feet higher than the plain on that side of the creek. This mesa extended up the creek as far as the men could see. The trail to Nock-ay-det-klinne's lodge ran between the bluff on which the village was situated and the bushes of the creek bottom. Here, the path was narrow because the bushes came up against the foot of the bluff. Cruse, Byrnes and the scouts reached Nock-ay-det-klinne's wickiup first. When they arrived, Mose came out with Nock-ay-det-klinne and introduced them. After they shook hands, Cruse told Nock-ay-det-klinne that Carr wanted to see him. The medicine man then asked where Carr was. Cruse said he was on his way. Carr soon arrived with his troops. The time was 3:00 pm.

Carr moved forward to meet Nock-ay-det-klinne, who was standing in front of his lodge with Mose and Charlie. The two shook hands. Carr recollected the meeting:

I told him through the interpreter what I had come for, as I had told the scouts the night before. This was told him in the presence of the other Indians, in their own language, so all should understand. [Only about three male Indians were around, besides the scouts.] . . . I then told him I would treat him as a friend till those charges had been investigated and if not true, he would be released. He had already denied them. He showed me a pass from the Agent for himself and others to plant corn on Cibicu for 60 days, dated May 13th, and extended July 13th for another 60 days. I told him the Agent wanted me to bring him in to talk & etc. He made [an] excuse for not coming before, that he had a patient to attend, and the Indians would have blamed him if he had left the sick man; but said he had cured him, and he had gone home this morning and he, Nock-ay-det-klinne, was now ready to go with me. I told him that was all right and if it was all explained he would be released in a few days. I then ordered a guard detailed [one noncommissioned officer and eight men]; told him who was in charge of that, Sergeant [John E] McDonald, Troop E, 6th Cavalry; that if he tried to escape, he would be killed. He smiled and said he did not want to escape, he was perfectly willing to go. I then told him that if there were an attempt at rescue he would be killed. He smiled at that also, and said no one would attempt to rescue him. I also told him he could take part of his family along with him. This talk was all in the presence of other Indians, purposely to reassure them and make a good case to their minds. Mose at times repeated and explained, when he did not seem to catch the meaning of Interpreter Hurrle. I thought that the possession of his person, as a hostage, would make them particularly careful not to bring on a collision.

As Carr prepared to leave Nock-ay-det-klinne's camp, he told his officers the command was going to proceed down the creek to find a camping place. He knew "almost exactly" where they were going to camp since he had noted the ground at the Verde Crossing earlier that day. He directed Troop D to follow behind him, then the pack train, followed by Nock-ay-det-klinne and his guard, then Troop E. Carr ordered Cruse, with his Apache scouts, to travel beside Nock-ay-det-klinne.

Byrnes and the officers' suspicions of the scouts had diminished somewhat because they appeared "altogether indifferent" about the taking of the medicine man. Carr turned his command around, by file, to leave the area. "Quite a good many squaws" were about, but only a few Apache men other than the scouts. Only one native showed some signs of hostility. He was about 100 yards from Nock-ay-det-klinne's lodge. He was totally naked, obviously drunk on tizwin.

As Carr left, he had the bugler sound the call to forward. His headquarters staff, Troop D, and the pack train followed directly behind him. At that point, a break in his column occurred. Nock-ay-det-klinne delayed the rest of the column while he got his personal belongings and a horse, and then entered his lodge and began to eat. When First Lieutenant William Stanton realized what was happening, he urged Sergeant McDonald to move out with his prisoner at once.

McDonald got Nock-ay-det-klinne to mount his horse and move forward. During this delay of about 10 minutes, Carr and the front half of his command followed the trail through its narrow part, then disappeared around a sharp turn and entered the heavy growth of cottonwood trees, high willows, and underbrush in the creek bottom. The sharp turn, which was on the trail they had come in on, was about a quarter of a mile from Nock-ay-det-klinne's camp.

About when Carr turned toward the creek, a scout named Sergeant Dead Shot came up to him and complained that the guard would not let Nock-ay-det-klinne's friends travel with him. Carr said that some of his friends could come in and see him after camp was made. Dead Shot returned to his company.

== Battle ==
Carr and the group traveling with him followed the trail through the creek bottom, winding in and out of the trees. It was about 200 yards from the sharp turn to the point where the trail crossed the creek. At the creek, Carr had the bugler sound the water call. The trail was rather steep, and the soldiers had to crowd into the river to water their stock and go up the bank single-file. After passing through the creek bottom, Carr left the trail he had been following. He turned south on an old trail that went around the growth, past an old ranch, and down the east side of the creek to the campsite he observed earlier. The campground was about two miles south of Nock-ay-det-klinne's lodge. Aside from the Indian scout whom he took with them, Carr was also joined by famed scouts Al Sieber and Tom Horn.

As the latter half of Carr's command waited for Nock-ay-det-klinne to get ready, about 15 armed Apaches approached. As the column departed, Cruse and Byrnes were in front, followed by the guard and Nock-ay-det-klinne, with the scouts in front and behind them, then Troop E. Before this group reached the narrow portion of the trail, more Apaches came up from down the creek and also moved along with them. All the natives were armed; most were mounted. As a precaution, while Cruse, the scouts, and Nock-ay-det-klinne and his guard stayed on the trail, which was on the flat below the mesa, Stanton and his men turned to the right and went up on the mesa and passed through the village. There, Stanton saw many women and children, but few men. He traveled about 300 yards on the plateau of the mesa before descending back to the flat.

At the start of the sharp turn in the trail, an old trail departed from it and ran down the west side of the creek. While Stanton was on top of the mesa, Cruse inadvertently missed the turn and took the old trail. Shortly thereafter, Stanton and his troop came down to the flat and united with Cruse's party. Stanton and Cruse discussed missing the turn. When they talked about it with the scouts, they said there was a better crossing a short distance downstream. The two men decided to continue to the better crossing. After the two officers conversed, Stanton and his troop marched on Cruse's flank. As they moved down the creek, several more parties of armed natives from downstream came up and traveled with their column. Others came out from the adjacent bluffs and ravines. They crowded around Nock-ay-det-klinne and his guard and Troop E. As each new party arrived, hurried conversation and excited talking arose. Generally, when the Apache fought, they stripped off all their clothes except their breechclouts. Most of the followers who arrived were wearing only a breechclout and a belt of cartridges. Pvt. John Burton, Troop D, later wrote:

Directly after arriving in camp, Lieut. Carter ordered a detail to go out for wood. I was detailed with a packer and one enlisted man and three mules for the purpose. We went about half a mile above the camp where some wood was lying near an old Indian tepee. While on the way up we met 'Dead Shot' on a horse—about half the way to the wood. He passed me and went on into camp. About then I saw another Indian sitting in the path—an Indian called Ka-cIenny—who asked me where I was going. I pointed to the wood and told him I was going after wood. He motioned his band and told me to hurry up and go ahead and became very much excited at the same time. He was at this same time undressing, had his moccasins off and was pulling off his drawers. As I rode away, another Indian rode up. Ka-clenny jumped up behind him and rode on towards the camp. I went on to the wood, tied the animals and was just gathering the wood when there was a volley fired in the camp.

As the skirmish erupted, the scouts, as suspected, mutinied. The attacking Apaches mostly kept their distance so the battle was fought mainly at rifle range, but when the scouts turned against the soldiers, a brief close-range engagement occurred. Hentig was shot in the back and the bullet passed through to his heart, killing him instantly. He was the first killed. Pvt. John Sullivan was still mounted on his horse and was fatally shot through the head. He was the sixth man killed. Scouts under Sieber and Horn, however, managed to get on top of a small hill. The scouts then repulsed the Apaches with their rifles, rescuing the cavalry, before giving them support as they finally launched a counter-attack that killed many of the Indians.

As night fell, Carr queried his officers, Byrnes, the chief packer, and others for their opinion about what to do next. He found they were "pretty unanimous in the wish to get out of there." Carr also saw no object in remaining. He decided it was best to get back to Fort Apache as soon as practicable. From the dispatch he had received from Cochran that morning, he knew a "great alarm" was occurring at the fort. He also knew that a few hostiles could set up an effective ambush along the trail back to the post, and any wait would give them more time to do so.

After dark, the soldiers gathered the bodies of the dead. Hampered by the darkness and the high brush, they could not find Private Miller, who had been killed in the creek bottom. Carr directed that a broad grave be dug under his tent to bury the corpses. Later, Carr said, "I wrote in my own book the position and age of the body as well as I could see by the moonlight to write and placed it on the breast of each one, showing what his name was and when he was killed and that he was buried on the 30th day of August by our command."

The grave was widened twice, for Privates Sonderegger and Bird, who died while it was being dug. Carr said, "When all was ready, I said over them as much of the service as I could remember and had taps sounded. This served for 'good night' to them, and also to indicate to Indians that we were going to sleep. To fire volleys over the graves would have been to notify Indians that we were burying these at night with the intention of moving at once."

== Aftermath ==
After burying their comrades, the soldiers needed time to get supper, arrange the packs, and pack the mules. Since not enough mules remained to carry all their supplies and march rapidly, some items had to be left behind. They left flour, bacon, canned goods, saddles, aparejos, and other equipment of the pack train. Preference was given to leaving the goods belonging to Cruse's scout company. Before leaving, they cut the flour bags and spread the flour on the ground. They destroyed all other goods and equipment that were to remain. All serviceable arms and ammunition that could be found were taken.

Years later, Carter wrote:

Before leaving the field, General Carr sent Lieutenant Carter to examine the body of the Medicine Man and determine if life was extinct. Strange to say, notwithstanding his wounds, he was still alive. The recovery of this Indian, if left in the hands of his friends, would have given him a commanding influence over these superstitious people, which would have resulted in endless war. General Carr then repeated the order for his death, specifying that no more shots should be fired. Guide Burns [Byrnes] was directed to carry out the order with the understanding that a knife was to be used. Burns, fearing failure, took an ax and crushed the forehead of the deluded fanatic, and from this time forward, every person murdered by these Apaches was treated in a similar manner.

The force left the battle site about 11:00 pm. Years later, Cruse recalled, "Everyone had been strictly warned against noise and straggling. We felt that the canyons were alive with Apaches, and after the fight, they would be as alert as ourselves." Since the Apaches had stolen about half their horses, most of the men of Troop D had to walk.

Carr placed Cruse in charge of the advance guard, which consisted of Mose, as guide, and some dismounted men of Troop D. Carr, Carter, and the headquarters staff, along with the remainder of Troop D, came next. Then came the pack train with the ammunition and other supplies and Troop E with the three wounded men under McCreery's care. Stanton was with the rear guard, which was composed of six or eight men. The wounded men were Private Baege, shot in the shoulder; Private Thomas J. F. Foran, shot through the intestines and bowels; and Sergeant John McDonald, shot in the leg. They rode on horses with men behind them to hold and steady them in their saddles. These attendants were relieved every few minutes.

Before the command reached Fort Apache, probably when it was near Cedar Creek, it met two prospectors on the trail. They told Carr that only one native, named Severiano, had preceded them toward the fort.

The column arrived back at Fort Apache around 3:00 pm. On the military side, seven soldiers were killed and two wounded, and 42 horses and seven pack mules were killed, wounded, or missing. All the men who had been struck belonged to Troop D, except McDonald, who was detailed from Troop E. Byrnes killed the wounded Nock-ay-det-klinne under Carr's orders; he was one of 18 Apaches killed in the engagement.

Carr estimated that fewer than 60 natives, including the scouts, attacked his command at the onset of the battle, and fewer than 200 fought his force at any time during the fight. Almost all damage done to his command occurred in the first volleys, while the Apaches were close to their camp. The bullets passed through the bodies of all the killed and wounded. Until the moment before the attack, all the officers with the command thought the Apaches' conduct was docile. Later, Lieutenant Carter said, "l felt perfectly secure, and I thought everybody else did. ... If I had had any feeling of insecurity, l don't think I would have walked down amongst them myself."

About 15 years later, Lieutenant Carter wrote,

That the loss was no more was due in a great measure to the coolness and courage of General Carr. A situation better calculated to try the mettle of a command could scarcely be imagined. Having effected the object of the march – the arrest of a notorious and mischief-making medicine man, – without difficulty, and with no resistance on the part of his people, the troops had set about making camp for the night, when suddenly they were fired upon, not alone by the friends of the medicine man, but by their own allies, the Indian scouts, who had hitherto been loyalty itself. The confusion and dismay, which such an attack at such a time, necessarily caused might well have resulted in the annihilation of the entire force, and constituted a situation from which nothing but the most consummate skill and bravery could pluck safety.

=== Results ===
The battle ended with a strategic Apache victory, despite their inability to rescue their leader, due to the soldiers' retreat. After the battle, the Army buried six soldiers, Nochaydelklinne, his wife, and young son, who was killed while riding into battle on his father's pony. One dead soldier was never found in the dark, and another died of his wounds the following day. Two Army troopers were reported to have been wounded. Colonel Carr made it back to Fort Apache with most of his remaining force intact. Two days later, the Apaches attacked the fort in retaliation for the death of the medicine man. Four soldiers were decorated with the Medal of Honor for their actions during the hostilities.

The Cibecue affair touched off a regional Apache uprising, in which the leading warriors of the Chiricahua and Warm Springs Apache, such as Naiche, Juh, and Geronimo, left the reservation. They went to war, trying to drive out the European Americans in Arizona, New Mexico, and northern Mexico. The warfare lasted about two years, ultimately ending in the US defeat of the Apache.

=== Sergeant Mandeville's poem: "On the Cibicu" ===
Shortly after the fight, Sergeant Mandeville wrote this poem.

On the Cabicu

"On the Cibicu"
Brave General Carr commanded –
Well and true.
The troops who fought in blue,
On August thirtieth, eighty one.
'T'was on the Cibicu.

Traitorous scouts, they did their work.
Then ran away.
When brave boys opened fire on them;
Then E Troop charged most gallantly
Across the bottom low and deep;
Those murderers ran – they fairly flew –
To "foot hills." far beyond
The roaring Cibicu.

Gallant Hentig to fall was number one.
And Livingston was two.
Poor Miller fell as number three.
Then Sunderriger pierced through;
Then Bird the gallant, brave, and true.
His captain's corpse went to;
He fell performing duty well,
This on the Cibicu.

Sullivan was number six to fall.
A soldier brave and true;
Then Mickey Foran met his fate;
A thorough soldier – an honor to blue.
Bagge – wounded in the shoulder deep –
McDonald in the leg;
Brave boys they suffered terribly.
Would not complain or beg.
This numbers all our comrades true.
Murdered, Wounded – died
On Cibicu.

Gallant Carter and Cruse – brave men –
And McCreery, God bless him,
Did surgeon's duty, yes more too;
Handled his carbine steadily.
Assisting soldiers true.
To wounded quickly he did go,
Though lead missiles thickly flew;
Cared nought, his duty would perform.
T'was on the Cibicu.

Young Clark M. Carr, a boy in teens.
Not accustomed to such scenes.
Did bravely, nobly, for one so young,
Handled well a soldier's gun.
Assisted much the boys in blue.
Fighting hard at Cibicu.

The grave was dug; no shroud, no coffin;
Rolled in a soldier's blanket;
One by one we laid the corpse in;
"Earth to earth." "ashes In ashes";
"Taps" true. "tis still as death."
Comrades murdered in the blue,
By traitorous scouts at Cibicu.

Comrades! "revenge is sweet"
To us it is and more;
With gallant Carr to lead us
We'd make the valleys roar.
With love for the murdered in our hearts
We'll hunt the Apache from his lair
Nor cease to fight with all our might,
And God protect us in the right.
Till all the murderers bite the earth.
Shall we be content.
Never falter; revenge 'tis true;
Our battle cry, 'The Cibicu!'

== See also ==
- American Indian Wars
