= National Register of Historic Places listings in Grant County, New Mexico =

Location of Grant County in New Mexico

This is a list of the National Register of Historic Places listings in Grant County, New Mexico.

This is intended to be a complete list of the properties and districts on the National Register of Historic Places in Grant County, New Mexico, United States. Latitude and longitude coordinates are provided for many National Register properties and districts; these locations may be seen together in a map.

There are 45 properties and districts listed on the National Register in the county, including 1 National Historic Landmark. All of the places within the county on the National Register are also listed on the State Register of Cultural Properties.

This National Park Service list is complete through NPS recent listings posted May 1, 2026.

Contents: NRHP in New Mexico by county
Bernalillo – Catron – Chaves – Cibola – Colfax – Curry – De Baca – Doña Ana – Eddy – Grant – Guadalupe – Harding – Hidalgo – Lea – Lincoln – Los Alamos – Luna – McKinley – Mora – Otero – Quay – Rio Arriba – Roosevelt – San Juan – San Miguel – Sandoval – Santa Fe – Sierra – Socorro – Taos – Torrance – Union – Valencia

== Current listings ==
	Name on the Register	Image	Date listed	Location	City or town	Description
1	Acklin Store		May 16, 1988 (#88000502)	State Road 90; 32°48′06″N 107°56′24″W	San Lorenzo	
2	H. B. Ailman House	H. B. Ailman House	May 12, 1975 (#75001163)	314 W. Broadway; 32°46′12″N 108°16′40″W	Silver City	
3	Trinidad Andazola House		May 16, 1988 (#88000500)	Southeast of State Road 61 and south of Eby Ranch Rd. 32°37′13″N 107°52′33″W	Dwyer	
4	Bowden Hall	Bowden Hall	September 22, 1988 (#88001552)	Northeast of Light Hall and southwest of Heating Plant on the Western New Mexico University campus 32°46′32″N 108°16′55″W	Silver City	
5	Bullard Hotel	Bullard Hotel	July 11, 1988 (#88000435)	102 S. Bullard St. 32°46′12″N 108°16′33″W	Silver City	
6	Burro Springs Site		December 31, 1974 (#74001197)	Address Restricted	Tyrone	
7	Chihuahua Hill Historic District	Chihuahua Hill Historic District	January 23, 1984 (#84002943)	Bounded by Cooper, Spring, Bullard, and Chihuahua Sts. 32°46′01″N 108°16′43″W	Silver City	
8	Tom Eby Storage Building		May 16, 1988 (#88000514)	West of State Road 61 and north of Eby Ranch Rd. 32°37′43″N 107°52′00″W	Dwyer	
9	Fleming Hall	Fleming Hall	September 22, 1988 (#88001553)	10th St. northeast of Bowden Hall on the Western New Mexico University campus 32°46′36″N 108°16′55″W	Silver City	
10	Fort Bayard Historic District	Fort Bayard Historic District	July 7, 2002 (#02000726)	0.5 miles north of the junction of U.S. Route 180 and State Road 152; 32°47′47″N 108°08′56″W	Santa Clara	
11	Graham Gymnasium	Graham Gymnasium	September 22, 1988 (#88001554)	Florida St. on the Western New Mexico University campus 32°46′36″N 108°17′06″W	Silver City	
12	Luciana B. Grijalva House		May 16, 1988 (#88000499)	East of State Road 61; 32°49′32″N 107°56′28″W	San Lorenzo	
13	Heating Plant	Heating Plant	September 22, 1988 (#88001555)	10th St. northeast of Bowden Hall on the Western New Mexico University campus 32°46′32″N 108°16′53″W	Silver City	
14	Hooks-Moore Store		May 16, 1988 (#88000490)	State Road 61 and Forest Road 73; 32°51′19″N 107°59′02″W	Mimbres	
15	Otto Huechling House		May 16, 1988 (#88000496)	East of State Road 61; 32°50′33″N 107°58′03″W	Mimbres	
16	Janss Site		July 23, 1980 (#80002550)	Address Restricted	San Lorenzo	
17	L.C. Ranch Headquarters	L.C. Ranch Headquarters	December 6, 1978 (#78001816)	Off U.S. Route 260; 32°57′52″N 108°34′50″W	Gila	
18	Light Hall	Light Hall	September 22, 1988 (#88001556)	Northern side of College Ave. at B St. on the Western New Mexico University campus 32°46′36″N 108°16′56″W	Silver City	
19	Mattocks Site	Mattocks Site	December 9, 1980 (#80002548)	12 Sage Drive, 32°50′34″N 107°57′49″W	Mimbres	
20	Menard-Galaz House		May 16, 1988 (#88000503)	West of State Road 90; 32°48′03″N 107°55′01″W	San Lorenzo	
21	Mimbres School		May 16, 1988 (#88000491)	East of State Road 61 and Forest Road 73; 32°51′17″N 107°58′52″W	Mimbres	
22	NAN Ranch		May 16, 1988 (#88000509)	East of State Road 61; 32°37′42″N 107°51′59″W	Dwyer	
23	George O. Perrault House		May 16, 1988 (#88000507)	East of State Road 61 1.7 miles north of Mimbres Hot Springs Canyon Rd. 32°44′49″N 107°53′15″W	Sherman	
24	Pinos Altos Historic District	Pinos Altos Historic District	May 21, 1984 (#84002945)	Roughly bounded by Gold Ave. and Cherry, Main, Church, and Silver Sts. 32°51′58″N 108°13′09″W	Pinos Altos	Gold camp established in 1860
25	Mauricio Portillo House		May 16, 1988 (#88000504)	East of State Road 61 1 mile south of State Road 90; 32°47′08″N 107°55′05″W	San Lorenzo	
26	William Redding House		May 16, 1988 (#88000483)	Off State Road 61; 32°51′16″N 107°58′52″W	Mimbres	
27	Reeds Peak Lookout Tower		January 28, 1988 (#87002472)	Squeaky Spring in the Gila National Forest; 33°08′35″N 107°51′14″W	Reeds Peak	
28	Ritch Hall	Ritch Hall	September 22, 1988 (#88001557)	10th St. southeast of Fleming Hall on the Western New Mexico University campus 32°46′35″N 108°16′53″W	Silver City	
29	St. Mary's Academy Historic District	St. Mary's Academy Historic District	September 15, 1983 (#83001621)	1813 N. Alabama St. 32°47′02″N 108°16′58″W	Silver City	
30	San Juan Historic District		May 16, 1988 (#88000481)	2261-2291 State Road 61; 32°45′37″N 107°54′17″W	San Juan	
31	San Juan Teacherage		May 16, 1988 (#88000508)	West of State Road 61 1.7 miles north of Mimbres Hot Springs Canyon Rd. 32°44′46″N 107°53′18″W	Sherman	
32	San Lorenzo Historic District	San Lorenzo Historic District	May 16, 1988 (#88000480)	Roughly Galaz St. between C and H Sts. 32°48′38″N 107°55′08″W	San Lorenzo	
33	George Sibole Store		May 16, 1988 (#88000482)	East of State Road 61, north of Forest Road 73; 32°51′22″N 107°59′04″W	Mimbres	
34	Silver City Historic District	Silver City Historic District	May 23, 1978 (#78001817)	Roughly bounded by Black, College, Hudson, and Spring Sts.; also roughly bounded by College Ave., the "Big Ditch", San Vicente & Black; 32°46′19″N 108°16′38″W	Silver City	Second set of boundaries represents a boundary increase of September 25, 2013
35	Silver City North Addition Historic District	Silver City North Addition Historic District	February 17, 1983 (#83001620)	Roughly bounded by the San Vicente Arroyo, College Ave., Chloride and 13th Sts. 32°46′33″N 108°16′44″W	Silver City	Listed in NRIS as the Silver City Historic District North Addition, though it is not a boundary increase of the Silver City Historic District according to its nomination
36	Silver City Water Works Building	Silver City Water Works Building	January 26, 1984 (#84002950)	Little Walnut Rd. 32°46′59″N 108°16′42″W	Silver City	
37	Silver City Woman's Club	Silver City Woman's Club	September 2, 2003 (#03000886)	411 Silver Heights Boulevard; 32°46′58″N 108°16′18″W	Silver City	
38	Soliz-Baca House		June 17, 1988 (#88000518)	Southeast of State Road 61 and south of Eby Ranch Rd. 32°37′28″N 107°52′14″W	Dwyer	
39	Antonio Torres House		May 16, 1988 (#88000505)	North of State Road 90 west of the Mimbres River bridge 32°47′28″N 107°55′02″W	San Lorenzo	
40	Maria J. and Juan Trujillo House		May 16, 1988 (#88000516)	East of State Road 61 and south of Eby Ranch Rd. 32°37′29″N 107°52′11″W	Dwyer	
41	Jesus Valencia House		May 16, 1988 (#88000506)	East of State Road 61; 32°46′39″N 107°54′52″W	San Juan	
42	Ysabel Valencia House		May 16, 1988 (#88000493)	East of State Road 61; 32°50′44″N 107°58′15″W	Mimbres	
43	Wheaton-Smith Site		July 23, 1980 (#80002549)	Address Restricted	San Juan	
44	Dr. Granville Wood House		May 16, 1988 (#88000498)	East of State Road 61; 32°50′33″N 107°58′01″W	Mimbres	
45	Woodrow Ruin		July 9, 1970 (#70000402)	Address Restricted	Cliff	

== See also ==
- List of National Historic Landmarks in New Mexico
- National Register of Historic Places listings in New Mexico
