= Trinidad Andazola House =

- U.S. National Register of Historic Places
- Location within New Mexico
- Location: Southeast of New Mexico State Road 61 and south of Eby Ranch Rd., Grant County, New Mexico, near Dwyer, New Mexico
- Coordinates: 32°37′13″N 107°52′33″W
- Area: less than one acre
- Built: c.1893
- Architectural style: Vernacular New Mexico
- MPS: Mimbres Valley MRA
- NRHP reference No.: 88000500
- Added to NRHP: May 16, 1988

The Trinidad Andazola House, in the Mimbres Valley near Dwyer, New Mexico (also known as Faywood, New Mexico) was listed on the National Register of Historic Places in 1988.

It is Vernacular New Mexico in style, and was built around 1893.

It is located on the west side of the Mimbres River, opposite the San Jose church, about 50 feet (15 m) southeast of New Mexico State Road 61 and .3 miles (0.48 km) south of the Eby Ranch Road.

It is a stuccoed adobe house with gabled roofs and a stuccoed external chimney. It was the home of Trinidad Andazola, who homesteaded 40 acres (16 ha) on the east side of the Mimbres River. It is "a good example of the Hispanic New Mexico Vernacular type, modified during the historic period under Anglo-American design influences. The original single file section with side facing gables was expanded in traditional fashion by a gabled rear addition and by an Anglo-style shed-roofed front porch."

It was listed on the National Register as part of a 1988 study of historic resources in the Mimbres Valley of Grant County.
