= NAN Ranch =

- U.S. National Register of Historic Places
- NM State Register of Cultural Properties
- Location within New Mexico
- Nearest city: Dwyer, New Mexico
- Coordinates: 32°39′16″N 107°50′59″W
- Area: 18 acres (7.3 ha)
- Architect: Henry C. Trost, Trost & Trost
- Architectural style: Spanish Colonial Revival
- MPS: Mimbres Valley MRA
- NRHP reference No.: 88000509
- NMSRCP No.: 1431

Significant dates
- Added to NRHP: May 16, 1988
- Designated NMSRCP: March 4, 1988

NAN Ranch, also known as Y Bar NAN Ranch, is a ranch in Faywood, New Mexico, that was added to the National Register of Historic Places in 1988. (Note: Some sources list the ranch being in Dwyer, but the town no longer exists. The post office in Dwyer was moved northeast from Faywood is named the Faywood Post Office.) The property was developed as a ranch beginning in the late-1860s by John Brockman, who grew corn, alfalfa, and several types of fruit and bred cattle. Cattleman John T. McElroy purchased the ranch in 1927 and hired Trost & Trost to renovate and expand the ranch compound to become the NAN Ranch headquarters. The project included a new house, extensive landscaping, swimming pool, a slaughterhouse, powerhouse, and other residential and ranch buildings. It is historically significant due to its architecture and its role as a major 19th century ranch.

== Geography ==
NAN Ranch is located along the Mimbres River, less than .5 miles (0.80 km) east of NM 61 and 2 miles (3.2 km) north of Dwyer, New Mexico.

== History ==
The property, developed in the late-1860s by John Brockman (Note: The National Register of Historic Places nomination form states that Brockman was a customs agent at Mowry City, New Mexico, however Mowry City was a short-lived town founded upon a scam. A biography of his life states that Brockman served for the Union during the Civil War and afterwards moved west. He panned for gold before buying the ranch. He went on to become a successful businessman, Silver City banker, and millionaire. By 1902, he lived in Los Angeles, California and was the owner of the Pearce, Arizona Commonwealth mine.) represents 19th century agricultural enterprise and New Mexican architecture in the Mimbres Valley. By 1869, he had cultivated 1,000 acres, operated the first flour mill in the area, and had more than 3,000 head of cattle. He patented his homestead claim in 1881. Archaeologist Adolph Bandelier called the homestead a "plazita" following his visit in 1883. Considered a "model ranch" in the Silver City Enterprise, Brockman produced corn, alfalfa, cherries, peaches, pears, grapes, and apples. He was the only supplier of hay to Fort Bayard and Fort Cummings. The Clifton Clarion said in 1886 that he had the best all-purpose ranches in the state of New Mexico. Besides his agricultural pursuits, Brockman bred black and Shorthorn cattle.

Brockman sold, what was considered "one of the three principal places on the Mimbres", in 1901 to the NAN Ranch and Cattle Company, which owned property just north of Brockman's land in Gallinas Canyon. NAN Ranch, which began developing its ranch in the 1880s, then moved its headquarters to the Brockman homestead. John T. McElroy, a cattleman from El Paso, Texas, bought the ranch in 1927. The El Paso-based architectural firm Trost & Trost was hired by McElroy and his wife to complete a US $300,000 ($5,560,345 today) project to renovate and expand the complex to include a new house, swimming pool, large courtyard and landscaping. The house alone cost $100,000 ($1,853,448 today). The following year sixteen additional residential and ranch buildings were constructed, including a power plant and slaughter house. It became "the best country place" built in New Mexico in the 1920s according to Baker Morrow, the landscape architect who consulted for the New Mexico Historic Preservation Division. In 1945 the ranch, that was then 100,000 acres, was sold. In 1988, when it was registered as a historic place, it was owned by W. B. Hinton. By that time the servants quarters building was used for archaeological teams from Texas A&M University who excavated the property's NAN Ranch Ruin. Archaeologist Harry J. Shafer at the university began working on the excavation of the ruins after having been contacted by Margaret Hinton, who him told of the ruins found on the ranch and the connection to the nearby Swarts Ruin of the Mimbres culture.

It was listed on the National Register as part of a 1988 study of historic resources in the Mimbres Valley of Grant County.

== Description ==
The approximate 18 acre NAN Ranch headquarters contains historic residential, farm, blacksmith, grain silos, and other buildings. The Brockman homestead was built about 1880. (Note: The nomination form provides a description of the Brockman house, but per the owner that information is incorrect.) The Spanish Colonial Revival McElroy House (1928) has a red clay tile gable roof, stuccoed walls, cast Solomonic columns, exposed wood and cast stone details, and wrought iron fixtures. It has a central octagonal sun room and a sleeping porch. A swimming pool, red clay tile deck, high-walled courtyard, and wooden arbor are near the two main residences. The property is landscaped with cypress, cottonwood, mulberry, and hollyhock trees. Roses, hollyhocks, iris, English Ivy, and privet hedges also feature in the landscaping.

Other historic residences include houses for the foreman, gardener, servants and cowboys. The foreman's house is a bungalow and a bunkhouse was built for cowboys. Other buildings include a slaughter house, blacksmith shop and power plant, chicken house, smoke house, laundry, garages, and barns. Irrigation ditches built by John Brockman were modified to concrete irrigation gutters.

== See also ==
- List of Trost & Trost works
- National Register of Historic Places listings in Grant County, New Mexico
