= Antonio Torres House =

Historic house in New Mexico, United States

- U.S. National Register of Historic Places
- Location within New Mexico
- Nearest city: San Lorenzo, Grant County, New Mexico
- Coordinates: 32°47′28″N 107°55′02″W
- Area: less than one acre
- Built: c.1930
- Architectural style: Vernacular New Mexico
- MPS: Mimbres Valley MRA
- NRHP reference No.: 88000505
- Added to NRHP: May 16, 1988

The Antonio Torres House is a historic house in San Lorenzo, Grant County, New Mexico. It was listed on the National Register of Historic Places in 1988. The house was built around 1930 by Antonio Torres and his wife, Josefina Ancheta.

It is located about 200 feet (61 m) north of the former Highway 90 (which is now New Mexico State Road 152) just west of the Mimbres River bridge. From the 1920s on, the two operated for thirty years the Black Range station, located .5 miles (0.80 km) east on Highway 90.

The house is deemed to be Vernacular New Mexico in style. Although the house is built of adobe with corrugated metal roofing, it has a rectangular plan and symmetry reflective of the Classical-derived "Hipped Box" type of architecture, of which it was deemed a "good example".

It was listed on the National Register as part of a 1988 study of historic resources in the Mimbres Valley of Grant County.
