= San Juan Historic District =

Historic district in New Mexico, United States

- U.S. National Register of Historic Places
- Location: 2261-2291 NM 61, San Juan, New Mexico
- Coordinates: 32°45′37″N 107°54′17″W
- Area: 23 acres (9.3 ha)
- Architectural style: Vernacular New Mexico
- MPS: Mimbres Valley MRA
- NRHP reference No.: 88000481
- Added to NRHP: May 16, 1988

The San Juan Historic District in San Juan, New Mexico is a 23 acres (9.3 ha) historic district which was listed on the National Register of Historic Places in 1988. The listing included 14 contributing buildings and two non-contributing buildings.

It was deemed notable as one of only two typical, well-preserved, Hispanic farming villages in the Mimbres valley, "the leading agricultural area of Grant County", and for its "unmodified examples of the New Mexico Vernacular type: thirteen residences, a school, a church and a barn."

It is located along what is now New Mexico State Road 61, from address number 2261 to 2291, on a somewhat raised terrace on the west side of the Mimbres River.

All of the buildings are built of adobe and all but two have corrugated metal roofs, and all may be termed Vernacular New Mexico in style. Nine houses have single file pans, two are L-shaped, and one has a rectangular plan. Seven have gable roofs, five have hipped roofs, two have combinations of gable and hipped roofs, and two have shed roofs.

The buildings include:

- the Rosalio Leiva House (c.1875 and 1935), 2291 S. Highway 61, a single file plan house with a shed-roofed front addition and a hipped roof, with a shed porch with log posts and brackets. Its original, core hipped roof area was the home of Leiva, who homesteaded the area, and is believed to date to the 1870s.
- House (pre-1937), 2291B S. Highway 61, with gable roof and wooden sliding windows
- House (pre-1937), 2287 S. Highway 61, possiblypre-1900; L-shaped in plan, with asphalt gabled roofs over an original flat roof, with vigas showing
- House (pre-1937), 2279 S. Highway 61, a single file house with a shed-roofed front plus rear additions, with a gabled roof, with wood and aluminum sliding windows
- House (c.1900), 2277 S. Highway 61, a single file house with an asphalt roll shed roof, with window/door/window symmetry.
- House (c.1900), 2275 S. Highway 61, rectangular plan with a shed roof
- San Juan School (1895 and 1917), 2271 S. Highway 61, unstuccoed adobe upon a concrete foundation skirt, with hipped and gabled roofs. Its first, hipped roof portion was built in 1895 on land reportedly donated by Luz Leiva. The gable-roofed portion was added in 1917.
- Anastacio Archuleta House (c.1890), 2263 S. Highway 61, a single file unstuccoed adobe house with a gabled roof, said to be built by Archuletas helped by Carlos Norero
- Carlos Norero House (c.1890), 2261 S. Highway 61, a single file, one-and-a-half story unstuccoed adobe house upon a stone foundation. This is the only one with architectural ornamentation (pedimented lintels), but it was in poor condition in 1988. Includes remnants of an adobe-walled compound to the rear.
- House (c.1935), 2296 S. Highway 61, stuccoed walls over unknown material, upon concrete foundation, with gabled roof and wooden sliding windows
- Cayetano Leiva Moonshine House (c.1920), 2290A S. Highway 61, a single file, stucco over adobe (original portion) and wood frame (side, shed-roofed addition), with a hipped roof. Original portion was built to house a still during Prohibition, and was later used as a tack room (for storage of horse equipment, harnesses, tackle) and as a residence. Has a barn to the rear.
- Cayetano Leiva House (c.1920), 2290 S. Highway 61, L-shaped with porch in the L and to the rear, with a concrete foundation and a hipped roof with gablets.
- San Juan Church (1901), 2282 S.Highway 61, a cruciform-plan church upon a stone foundation, with gabled and hipped roofs and a cupola.

The two non-contributing buildings are:

- House (pre-1937), 2283 S. Highway 61, with aluminum sliding windows and a new porch with wrought iron supports.
- House (post-1937), 2281 S. Highway 61, a single file adobe house with gabled roofs, with an enclosed porch with sliding aluminum windows.

The district was listed on the National Register as part of a 1988 study of historic resources in the Mimbres Valley of Grant County.
