= Mimbres School =

- U.S. National Register of Historic Places
- Location within New Mexico
- Location: East of NM 61 and Forest Rt. 73, Mimbres, New Mexico
- Coordinates: 32°51′17″N 107°58′52″W
- Area: less than one acre
- Architectural style: Vernacular New Mexico
- MPS: Mimbres Valley MRA
- NRHP reference No.: 88000491
- Added to NRHP: May 16, 1988

The Mimbres School, in Mimbres, New Mexico, was listed on the National Register of Historic Places in 1988. It is located East of NM 61 and Forest Rt. 73.

According to its 1988 National Register nomination, "This is one of four unaltered historic buildings remaining in Mirabres.... Built in the 1890s, this along with the San Juan school, is one of the first two schools built in the valley and [is] a good reminder of the early settlement of Grant County. It uses typical materials of the local New Mexico Vernacular—adobe and corrugated roofing—but adapted to a new purpose, and a scale just slightly larger than the normal residence. It [is] as a good, well-preserved example of the New Mexico Vernacular type."

It was listed on the National Register as part of a 1988 study of historic resources in the Mimbres Valley of Grant County.
