= Menard-Galaz House =

Historic house in New Mexico, United States

- Menard--Galaz House
- U.S. National Register of Historic Places
- Location within New Mexico
- Nearest city: San Lorenzo, Grant County, New Mexico
- Coordinates: 32°48′03″N 107°55′01″W
- Area: less than one acre
- Architectural style: Vernacular New Mexico
- MPS: Mimbres Valley MRA
- NRHP reference No.: 88000503
- Added to NRHP: May 16, 1988

The Menard-Galaz House is a historic house in San Lorenzo, Grant County, New Mexico. It was built circa 1895 by John Menard, a homesteader. It was acquired by Manuel Galaz in 1908. The house was designed in the Vernacular New Mexico architectural style. It has been listed on the National Register of Historic Places since May 16, 1988.

It was listed on the National Register as part of a 1988 study of historic resources in the Mimbres Valley of Grant County.
