= Maria J. and Juan Trujillo House =

Historic house in New Mexico, United States

- U.S. National Register of Historic Places
- Location within New Mexico
- Nearest city: Dwyer, New Mexico
- Coordinates: 32°37′29″N 107°52′11″W
- Area: less than one acre
- Architectural style: Vernacular Spanish-Mexican
- MPS: Mimbres Valley MRA
- NRHP reference No.: 88000516
- Added to NRHP: May 16, 1988

The Maria J. and Juan Trujillo House is a historic adobe house in Dwyer, New Mexico. It was probably built in the 1870s, although possibly as early as 1836. It belonged to homesteaders Juan Evangelista Trujillo and Maria Jesus Trujillo in 1882. The house was designed in the Vernacular Spanish-Mexican architectural style. It has been listed on the National Register of Historic Places since May 16, 1988.

It was listed on the National Register as part of a 1988 study of historic resources in the Mimbres Valley of Grant County.
