= Tom Eby Storage Building =

- U.S. National Register of Historic Places
- Location within New Mexico
- Nearest city: Dwyer, New Mexico
- Coordinates: 32°37′43″N 107°52′00″W
- Area: less than one acre
- Architectural style: Vernacular New Mexico
- MPS: Mimbres Valley MRA
- NRHP reference No.: 88000514
- Added to NRHP: May 16, 1988

The Tom Eby Storage Building, near Dwyer, New Mexico, was built in 1888 or later. It was listed on the National Register of Historic Places in 1988.

It is located about 50 feet (15 m) west of State Road 61 and 200 feet (61 m) north of Eby Ranch Rd. It is a rectangular stuccoed adobe building with a corrugated metal hipped roof with "gablets". Some original flat earthen roof sections remain. It has four single doors. Original windows were closed in.

According to its National Register nomination "This building began as a house for Simeon Eby who received the patent for his homestead in 1888. The building is a good example of New Mexico Vernacular construction in the valley and as such meets Criterion C. Its single file plan with a door to each room, adobe construction and hipped roof with gablets are all typical of this predominant historic type. The rooms are deeper than normal, however. After a new house was built nearby by Tom Eby, the building was used as a farm kitchen. In 1972, the windows were bricked in and the building devoted to storage."

It was listed on the National Register as part of a 1988 study of historic resources in the Mimbres Valley of Grant County.
