= Luciana B. Grijalva House =

- U.S. National Register of Historic Places
- Nearest city: San Lorenzo, Grant County, New Mexico
- Coordinates: 32°49′32″N 107°56′28″W
- Area: less than one acre
- Architectural style: Vernacular New Mexico
- MPS: Mimbres Valley MRA
- NRHP reference No.: 88000499
- Added to NRHP: May 16, 1988

The Luciana B. Grijalva House, about .4 miles (0.64 km) east of New Mexico State Road 61 near San Lorenzo, Grant County, New Mexico, was listed on the National Register of Historic Places in 1988.

It is Vernacular New Mexico in style. " The original, single-file section of the house was built before 1912 as a traditional flat-roofed adobe structure. The front addition was added in 1918 and the pitched roof at that time or before. The house is a very good example of the New Mexico Vernacular tradition and how it evolved in the early 20th Century...."

It is located 1.5 miles (2.4 km) north of the San Lorenzo turn-off.

It was listed on the National Register as part of a 1988 study of historic resources in the Mimbres Valley of Grant County.
