= Hooks-Moore Store =

- U.S. National Register of Historic Places
- Location within New Mexico
- Location: NM 61 and Forest Rt. 73, Mimbres, New Mexico
- Coordinates: 32°51′19″N 107°59′02″W
- Area: less than one acre
- Built: 1922
- MPS: Mimbres Valley MRA
- NRHP reference No.: 88000490
- Added to NRHP: May 16, 1988

The Hooks-Moore Store, at the southwest corner of the junction of NM 61 and Forest Rt. 73 in Mimbres, New Mexico, was built before and during 1922. It was listed on the National Register of Historic Places in 1922.

It is a wood frame and clapboard building with corrugated metal gables. The listing included a second contributing building: an unstuccoed adobe outbuilding with a corrugated metal hipped roof, and with a shed-roofed board-and-batten addition.

In 1988 it was deemed significant as the only surviving historic wood-frame structure in the Mimbres Valley, and as one of few unaltered historic buildings in the village of Mimbres, and as "a good representative of the commercial importance of Mimbres in the upper Mimbres valley". Part of the building, the residential portion now at the back, was built before 1922 in a location across the road by Raul Spulveda. J.J. Hooks purchased that in 1922 and moved it to the current location, and further added the front parts, including a false-fronted section. In 1988, it had not further been altered. The false-fronted front portion served as the Mimbres post office. The left portion served as a store run by Hooks and later by Walter Moore.

It was listed on the National Register as part of a 1988 study of historic resources in the Mimbres Valley of Grant County.
