= Jesus Valencia House =

Historic house in New Mexico, United States

- U.S. National Register of Historic Places
- Location within New Mexico
- Nearest city: San Juan, New Mexico
- Coordinates: 32°46′39″N 107°54′52″W
- Area: less than one acre
- Architectural style: Vernacular New Mexico
- MPS: Mimbres Valley MRA
- NRHP reference No.: 88000506
- Added to NRHP: May 16, 1988

The Jesus Valencia House is a historic house in San Juan, New Mexico. It was built in 1911 for Jesus Valencia. It was designed in the Vernacular New Mexico architectural style. It has been listed on the National Register of Historic Places since May 16, 1988.

It was listed on the National Register as part of a 1988 study of historic resources in the Mimbres Valley of Grant County.
