= San Juan Teacherage =

- U.S. National Register of Historic Places
- Location within New Mexico
- Nearest city: Sherman, New Mexico
- Coordinates: 32°44′46″N 107°53′18″W
- Area: less than one acre
- Built: 1923
- Built by: Entzminger, John
- Architectural style: Vernacular New Mexico
- MPS: Mimbres Valley MRA
- NRHP reference No.: 88000508
- Added to NRHP: May 16, 1988

The San Juan Teacherage is a teacherage near Sherman, New Mexico. It was built in 1923 and was listed on the National Register of Historic Places in 1988.

It is located on State Road 61, about 50 feet (15 m) to the west of it, about 1.7 miles (2.7 km) north of Mimbres Hot Springs Canyon Rd.

It is a single file plan building built in 1923 on a raised foundation (likely made of concrete), with stuccoed walls and a corrugated metal hipped roof in Vernacular New Mexico style.

It was built by homesteader John Entzminger for schoolteachers at the San Juan school. Its construction was funded by the state, and it was built on land donated by Alfred Perrault, son of settler George Perrault. According to its National Register nomination, "Alfred was continuing a family tradition of supporting local education (see George Perrault House, #3, discussion) and this explains the location of the teachers residence here away from the school in San Juan."

It was deemed "a good, unmodified example of the New Mexico Vernacular type in the early twentieth century. The stuccoed walls of the building, its single file plan and corrugated metal hipped roof, are similar to most New Mexico Vernacular residences in the valley, although the raised foundation is an Anglo-American element."

It was listed on the National Register as part of a 1988 study of historic resources in the Mimbres Valley of Grant County.
