= George Sibole Store =

- U.S. National Register of Historic Places
- Location within New Mexico
- Location: E of NM 61, N of Forest Rt. 73, Mimbres, New Mexico
- Coordinates: 32°51′22″N 107°59′04″W
- Area: less than one acre
- Built: 1912
- Architectural style: Vernacular New Mexico
- MPS: Mimbres Valley MRA
- NRHP reference No.: 88000482
- Added to NRHP: May 16, 1988

The George Sibole Store, in Mimbres, New Mexico, was built in 1912 and was listed on the National Register of Historic Places in 1988.

It is located on the east side of New Mexico State Road 61, just north of its intersection with Forest Rt. 73. It is a Vernacular New Mexico style building, made of unstuccoed adobe upon a stone foundation with a corrugated metal gabled roof.

In 1988 it was one of just four historic buildings in Mimbres which had not been altered. The store was built to replace an earlier store building which burned in 1911. the store was deemed "a substantial example of the New Mexico Vernacular type common in the valley". "When Sibole died in 1917 an inventory of the store included "cooking and washing utensils, baby clothes, stove polish, padlocks, ladies' fleece-lined drawers, combs, pocket knives, soap (given free with a case of perfume), sewing supplies, groceries, shoes, pencils and jewelry," along with camphor, castor oil, turpentine and epsom salts."

It was listed on the National Register as part of a 1988 study of historic resources in the Mimbres Valley of Grant County.
