= Mauricio Portillo House =

Historic house in New Mexico, United States

- U.S. National Register of Historic Places
- Location within New Mexico
- Nearest city: San Lorenzo, Grant County, New Mexico
- Coordinates: 32°47′08″N 107°55′05″W
- Area: less than one acre
- Architectural style: Center hall plan
- MPS: Mimbres Valley MRA
- NRHP reference No.: 88000504
- Added to NRHP: May 16, 1988

The Mauricio Portillo House is a historic house in San Lorenzo, Grant County, New Mexico. It was built circa 1890 by Mauricio Portillo, a settler from Mexico. It was designed with a center hall plan and a hip roof. It has been listed on the National Register of Historic Places since May 16, 1988.

The house was deemed significant as one of a group of early settlement hip-roofed, center hall plan houses, whose style had been studied explicitly in southern Arizona but whose presence in southern New Mexico had only been noted. It was felt "the house may offer important information on the spread of this house type across the Southwest." Also its "adobe barn is the largest in the valley and has a unique ventilator wall."

It was listed on the National Register as part of a 1988 study of historic resources in the Mimbres Valley of Grant County.
