= Dr. Granville Wood House =

Historic house in New Mexico, United States

- U.S. National Register of Historic Places
- Location within New Mexico
- Nearest city: Mimbres, New Mexico
- Coordinates: 32°50′33″N 107°58′01″W
- Area: less than one acre
- Architectural style: Vernacular New Mexico
- MPS: Mimbres Valley MRA
- NRHP reference No.: 88000498
- Added to NRHP: May 16, 1988

The Dr. Granville Wood House is a historic house in Mimbres, New Mexico. It was built in the early 1880s for Granville Wood, a physician and homesteader. It was designed in the Vernacular New Mexico architectural style. It has been listed on the National Register of Historic Places since May 16, 1988.

The house is adjacent to the Otto Huechling House, another listed house.

It was listed on the National Register as part of a 1988 study of historic resources in the Mimbres Valley of Grant County.
