= Otto Huechling House =

Historic house in New Mexico, United States

- U.S. National Register of Historic Places
- Location within New Mexico
- Nearest city: Mimbres, New Mexico
- Coordinates: 32°50′33″N 107°58′03″W
- Area: less than one acre
- Architectural style: Center hall plan
- MPS: Mimbres Valley MRA
- NRHP reference No.: 88000496
- Added to NRHP: May 16, 1988

The Otto Huechling House is a historic house in Mimbres, New Mexico. It was built in 1917 by Otto Huechling, who came to New Mexico as a homesteader in the 1870s. It was designed with a central hall plan and a hipped roof. It has been listed on the National Register of Historic Places since May 16, 1988.

It is adjacent to the Dr. Granville Wood House, another listed house.

It was listed on the National Register as part of a 1988 study of historic resources in the Mimbres Valley of Grant County.
