= Acklin Store =

- U.S. National Register of Historic Places
- Location: New Mexico State Road 90, Grant County, New Mexico, near San Lorenzo
- Coordinates: 32°48′06″N 107°56′24″W
- Area: less than one acre
- MPS: Mimbres Valley MRA
- NRHP reference No.: 88000502
- Added to NRHP: May 16, 1988

The Acklin Store, on New Mexico State Road 90 near San Lorenzo, Grant County, New Mexico, was listed on the National Register of Historic Places in 1988.

It is significant for its association with Henry Acklin, a miner from Georgetown, who moved to this area and built this store in about 1920. He then built a number of rental houses and the area became the commercial center for the mid-Mimbres Valley and became known as Acklin Hill.

It is a two-story L-shaped building with a one-story section in the L. It is made of adobe with stucco in parts and clapboard elsewhere. Although built of adobe, it has a relatively normal vernacular commercial style, with large store display windows and a centered door.

It is located on the north side of Highway 90 approximately .3 miles (0.48 km) west of its junction with S. Highway 61.

It was listed on the National Register as part of a 1988 study of historic resources in the Mimbres Valley of Grant County.
