= Mimbres =

Mimbres may refer to:

- Mimbres culture (c. 1100–1150 CE), a subdivision of Mogollon culture
- Mimbres pottery, a particular style of pottery decoration from the Mimbres culture
- Mimbres Valley AVA, an American Viticultural Area in southwestern New Mexico
- Mimbres River, a river in New Mexico
- Mimbres Mountains, the southernmost part of the Black Range
- Mlimbres Apaches, a band of the Chiricahua Apaches of the Southwestern US.
