= William Redding House =

Historic house in New Mexico, United States

- U.S. National Register of Historic Places
- Location within New Mexico
- Location: Off NM 61, Mimbres, New Mexico
- Coordinates: 32°51′16″N 107°58′52″W
- Area: less than one acre
- Built: between 1893 and 1902
- Architectural style: Vernacular New Mexico
- MPS: Mimbres Valley MRA
- NRHP reference No.: 88000483
- Added to NRHP: May 16, 1988

William Redding House is a historic house in Mimbres, New Mexico. It was built with adobe in 1893 for William Redding, a farmer. The house is "one of four unaltered historic buildings" in Mimbres. It was designed in the Vernacular New Mexico architectural style. It has been listed on the National Register of Historic Places since May 16, 1988.

It is believed to have been built between 1893 (when farmer and rancher William Redding first paid taxes on the property) and 1902 (when reports about a great flood noted about the Redding ranch). It is significant as a "very good example of the single file plan of the New Mexico Vernacular type".

The house includes an unstuccoed adobe room on its north side used as a garage, believed to be part of the original house. The listing includes the house and a turn-of-the-19th-century era ornamental wire, pipe and cast-iron fence in front.

It was listed on the National Register as part of a 1988 study of historic resources in the Mimbres Valley of Grant County.
