= Bowden Hall =

- U.S. National Register of Historic Places
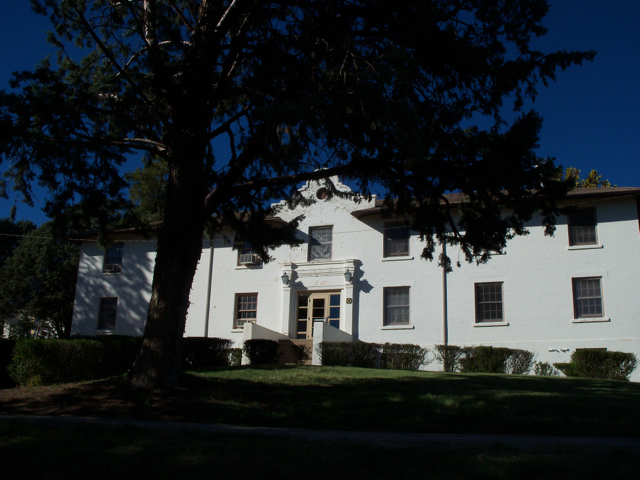
- The building in 2013

- Location within New Mexico
- Location: NE of Light Hall and SW of Heating Plant, WNMU, Silver City, New Mexico
- Coordinates: 32°46′32″N 108°16′55″W
- Area: 0.1 acres (0.040 ha)
- Built: 1928
- Architect: Trost & Trost
- Architectural style: Mission Revival
- MPS: New Mexico Campus Buildings Built 1906--1937 TR
- NRHP reference No.: 88001552
- Added to NRHP: September 22, 1988

Bowden Hall is a historic building on the campus of Western New Mexico University in Silver City, New Mexico. It was built as a men's dormitory in 1928, and it was named in honor of a member of the board of regents. The bedrooms were later repurposed as classrooms. It was designed in the Mission Revival architectural style by Trost & Trost. It has been listed on the National Register of Historic Places since September 22, 1988. It currently houses the Department of Humanities.
