= List of bridges documented by the Historic American Engineering Record in New Mexico =

This is a list of bridges documented by the Historic American Engineering Record in the U.S. state of New Mexico.

== Bridges ==
Survey No.	Name (as assigned by HAER)	Status	Type	Built	Documented	Carries	Crosses	Location	County	Coordinates
NM-16	Denver & Rio Grande Railroad, San Juan Extension, Wolf Creek Trestle	Extant	Trestle	1883	2010	Cumbres and Toltec Scenic Railroad	Wolf Creek	Chama	Rio Arriba	36°57′20″N 106°32′28″W
NM-29	Terry Canyon Bridge No. 1	Replaced	Reinforced concrete cast-in-place slab	1942	2015	National Forest System Road 150	Terry Canyon	Mimbres	Grant	33°04′01″N 108°00′04″W
NM-30	Terry Canyon Bridge No. 3	Replaced	Reinforced concrete cast-in-place slab	1942	2015	National Forest System Road 150	Terry Canyon	Mimbres	Grant	33°04′04″N 108°00′07″W
NM-31	Terry Canyon Bridge No. 4	Replaced	Reinforced concrete cast-in-place slab	1942	2015	National Forest System Road 150	Terry Canyon	Mimbres	Grant	33°04′18″N 108°00′11″W
NM-32	Indian Creek Bridge	Replaced	Reinforced concrete cast-in-place slab	1942	2015	National Forest System Road 150	Indian Creek	Mimbres	Grant	33°23′49″N 108°06′00″W
NM-33	Black Canyon Small Bridge	Replaced	Reinforced concrete cast-in-place slab	1942	2015	National Forest System Road 150	Black Canyon tributary	Mimbres	Grant	33°11′00″N 108°01′49″W
NM-34	Black Canyon Big Bridge	Replaced	Reinforced concrete cast-in-place slab	1942	2015	National Forest System Road 150	Black Canyon	Mimbres	Grant	33°11′07″N 108°01′40″W
