= Graham Gymnasium =

- U.S. National Register of Historic Places
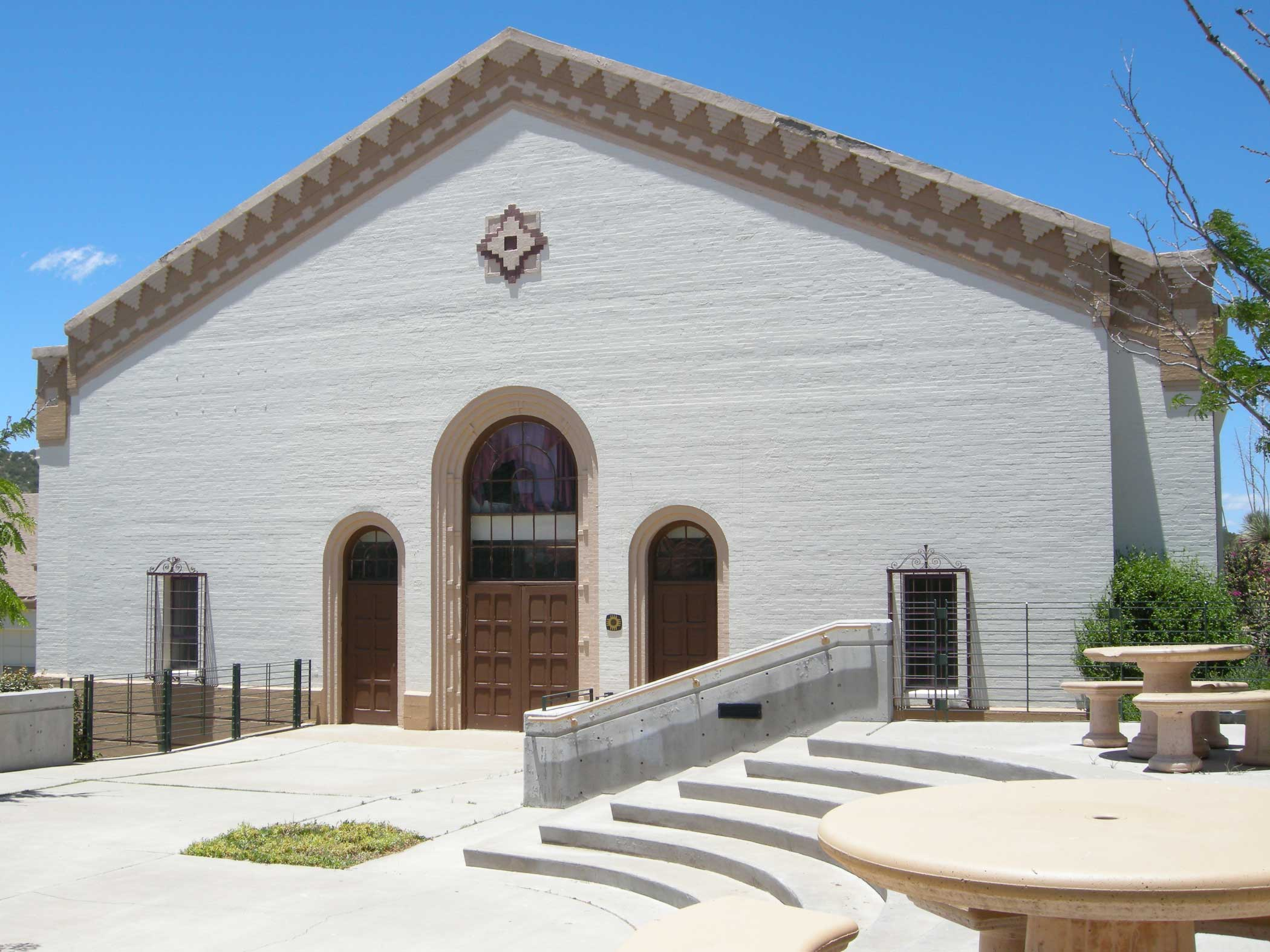
- The Graham Gymnasium in 2010

- Location within New Mexico
- Location: Florida Street, WNMU, Silver City, New Mexico
- Coordinates: 32°46′36″N 108°17′06″W
- Area: 2 acres (0.81 ha)
- Built: 1936
- Architect: John Gaw Meem
- Architectural style: Mission Revival
- MPS: New Mexico Campus Buildings Built 1906--1937 TR
- NRHP reference No.: 88001554
- Added to NRHP: September 22, 1988

The Graham Gymnasium is a historic building on the campus of Western New Mexico University in Silver City, New Mexico. It was built in 1936, making it one of the last buildings of the original campus completed. An extension was built in 1977–1978. The original building was designed in the Mission Revival style by architect John Gaw Meem, with a Zia sun symbol. It has been listed on the National Register of Historic Places since September 22, 1988.
