= Andrew Gulliford =

American historian (born 1953)

- Born: November 2, 1953 (age 73)
- Occupations: Author, historian
- Website: andrewgulliford.com

Dr. Andrew Gulliford (born November 2, 1953) is an American author, historian and photographer. He is a professor of history at Fort Lewis College in Durango, Colorado.

He has received the National Individual Volunteer Award from the U.S. Forest Service, for his work in wilderness education, and has been recognized by the Secretary of Agriculture for his "contributions to America's natural and cultural resources."

== Early life ==
Gulliford, who grew up in Lamar, Colorado, completed his bachelor's degree in American history and his master's degree in teaching at Colorado College. He gained a doctorate in American culture and history at Bowling Green State University.

== Career ==
Gulliford worked as a fourth-grade teacher in Silt, Colorado, and, before studying for his doctorate, taught American history at Colorado Mountain College's Rifle branch.

In 1997, Gulliford began a three-year stint as director of the Western New Mexico University Museum. Between 1990 and 2000, he was a professor of the Public History and Historic Preservation program at Middle Tennessee State University. In 2000, he became the director of the Center of Southwest Studies prior to becoming a professor of history at Fort Lewis College in Durango, Colorado.

He received the Fitch Foundation's Mid-Career Fellowship in 1991, based on his research on the preservation of tribal history. He wrote "Gulliford's Travels", a monthly column in The Durango Herald.

== Publications ==
Gulliford has written several books, including:

- America's Country Schools (1984) ISBN 9780891331124
- Boomtown Blues: Colorado Oil Shale (1989) ISBN 0870811789
- Sacred Objects and Sacred Places: Preserving Tribal Traditions (2000) ISBN 9780870815607
- Outdoors in the Southwest: An Adventure Anthology (2014) ISBN 9780806142609
- The Woolly West (2019) ISBN 978-1-62349-930-3
