= Light Hall =

- U.S. National Register of Historic Places
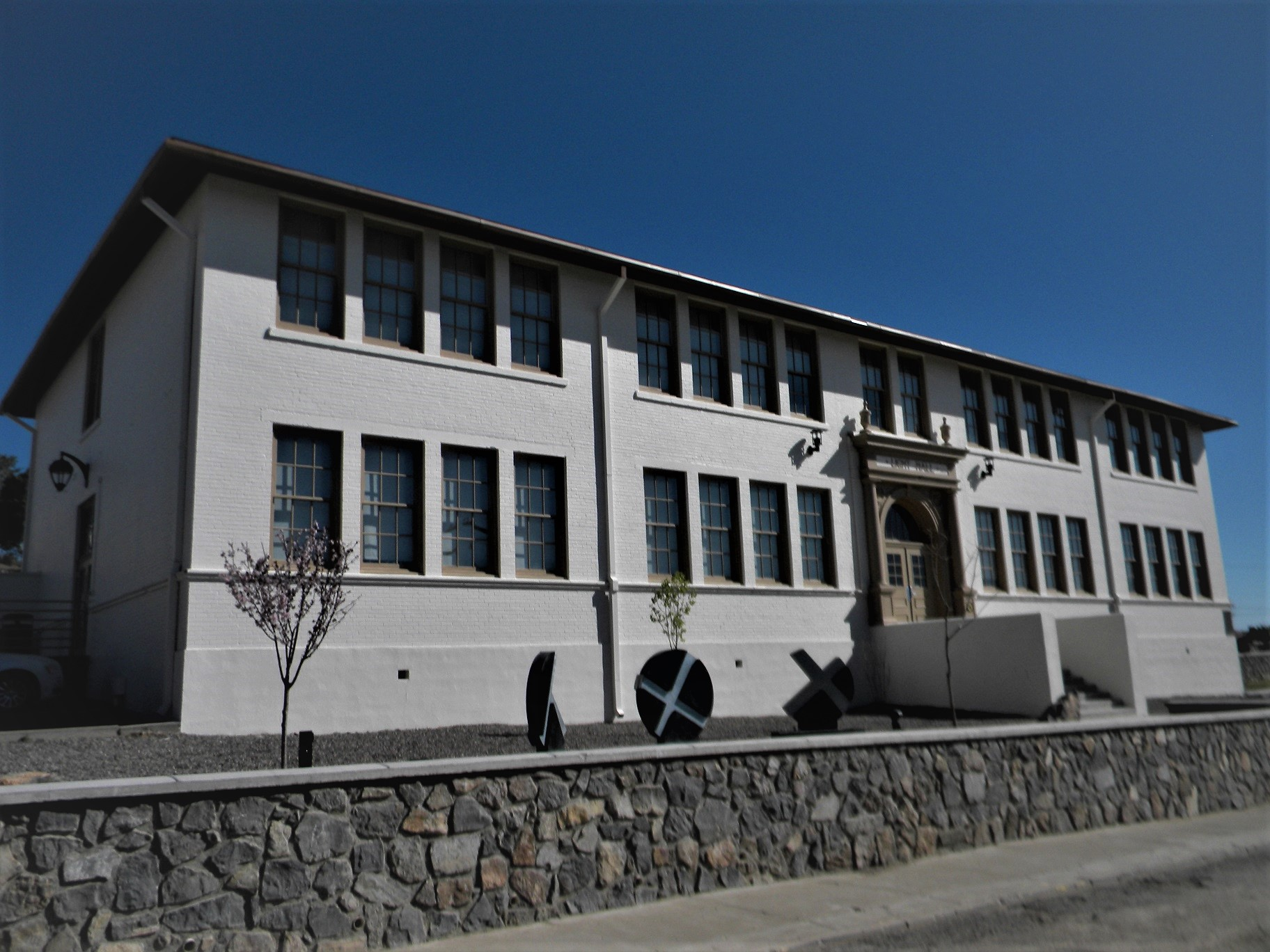
- Light Hall in 2017

- Location within New Mexico
- Location: North side of College Avenue at B Street, WNMU, Silver City, New Mexico
- Coordinates: 32°46′36″N 108°16′56″W
- Area: 0.2 acres (0.081 ha)
- Built: 1928
- Architect: Trost & Trost
- Architectural style: Renaissance
- MPS: New Mexico Campus Buildings Built 1906--1937 TR
- NRHP reference No.: 88001556
- Added to NRHP: September 22, 1988

Light Hall is a historic building on the campus of Western New Mexico University in Silver City, New Mexico. It was built as a library and auditorium in 1928, and it was later remodelled into classrooms. It was named in honor of Dr. C. M. Light, WNMU's president from 1896 to 1915, who attended the dedication on April 20, 1928. Governor Richard C. Dillon was also in attendance. The building was designed in the Renaissance Revival style by Trost & Trost. It has been listed on the National Register of Historic Places since September 22, 1988.
