= Soliz-Baca House =

Historic house in New Mexico, United States

- Soliz--Baca House
- U.S. National Register of Historic Places
- Location within New Mexico
- Nearest city: Dwyer, New Mexico
- Coordinates: 32°37′28″N 107°52′14″W
- Area: less than one acre
- Architectural style: New Mexico Vernacular
- MPS: Mimbres Valley MRA
- NRHP reference No.: 88000518
- Added to NRHP: June 17, 1988

The Soliz-Baca House is a historic house in Dwyer, New Mexico. It was built with adobe for Alvino Soliz, and purchased by Ed Baca in 1935. Baca rebuilt a room. The house was designed in the New Mexico Vernacular architectural style. It has been listed on the National Register of Historic Places since June 17, 1988.
