= San Lorenzo Historic District =

Historic district in New Mexico, United States

- U.S. National Register of Historic Places
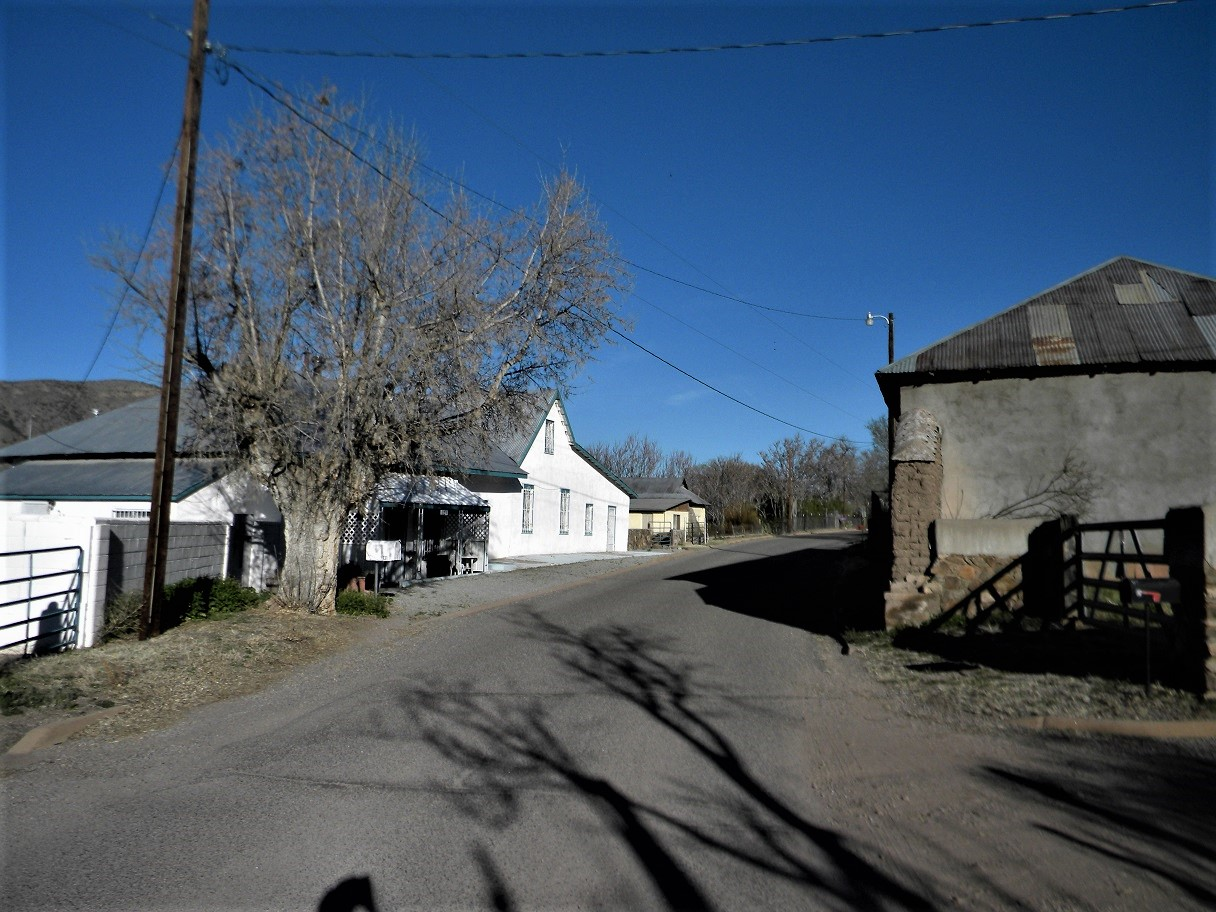

- Location within New Mexico
- Location: Roughly Galaz St. between C and H Sts., San Lorenzo, Grant County, New Mexico
- Coordinates: 32°48′38″N 107°55′08″W
- Area: 80 acres (32 ha)
- Built by: Works Projects Administration
- Architectural style: Vernacular New Mexico
- MPS: Mimbres Valley MRA
- NRHP reference No.: 88000480
- Added to NRHP: May 16, 1988

The San Lorenzo Historic District, in San Lorenzo, Grant County, New Mexico, is an 80 acres (32 ha) historic district which was listed on the National Register of Historic Places in 1988.

The district runs roughly along the west side of Galaz St., the main street of San Lorenzo, and some adjacent blocks between C and H Streets. It includes 29 contributing buildings.

Most buildings are adobe in New Mexico vernacular style. It includes a school built by the Works Projects Administration.

It was listed on the National Register as part of a 1988 study of historic resources in the Mimbres Valley of Grant County.
