= Ritch Hall =

- U.S. National Register of Historic Places
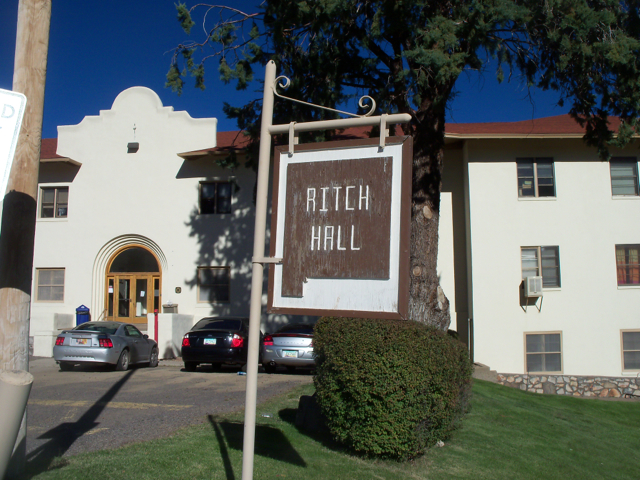
- Ritch Hall in 2013

- Location within New Mexico
- Location: 10th Street SE of Fleming Hall, WNMU, Silver City, New Mexico
- Coordinates: 32°46′35″N 108°16′53″W
- Area: 0.3 acres (0.12 ha)
- Built: 1906
- Architect: Charles Frederick Whittlesey
- Architectural style: Mission/spanish Revival, California Mission Revival
- MPS: New Mexico Campus Buildings Built 1906--1937 TR
- NRHP reference No.: 88001557
- Added to NRHP: September 22, 1988

Ritch Hall is a historic building on the campus of Western New Mexico University in Silver City, New Mexico, United States. It was built as a women's dormitory. Its construction cost $30,000, and it was completed in 1906, with remodels in 1925 and 1948. The building was named in honor of W.G. Ritch, who served as the president of the board of regents of WNMU from 1902 to 1904. It was designed in the Mission Revival style by architect Charles Frederick Whittlesey in 1906, and an extension was designed by architect John Gaw Meem in 1950. It has been listed on the National Register of Historic Places since September 22, 1988.
