= John E. Counts =

Dr. John E. Counts is the fourteenth president of Western New Mexico University, a position he held from November 1993 to June 2011.

Counts worked at the university as Professor of Management and Director of the Division of Business, Math and Computer Science for one year before becoming president.
