= Silver City North Addition Historic District =

Historic district in New Mexico, United States

- U.S. National Register of Historic Places
- U.S. Historic district
- NM State Register of Cultural Properties
- Location within New Mexico Location within the United States
- Location: Roughly bounded by the San Vicente Arroyo, College Ave., Chloride and 13th Sts., Silver City, New Mexico
- Coordinates: 32°46′33″N 108°16′44″W
- Area: 36 acres (15 ha)
- Built: 1914
- Architect: Multiple
- Architectural style: Late 19th And Early 20th Century American Movements, Queen Anne
- NRHP reference No.: 83001620
- NMSRCP No.: 883

Significant dates
- Added to NRHP: February 17, 1983
- Designated NMSRCP: June 4, 1982

The Silver City North Addition Historic District is a residential historic district in Silver City, New Mexico. The district includes several blocks on the north side of College Avenue; the area between West and Santa Rita Streets is especially significant. The North Addition was a well-to-do neighborhood of Silver City in the late 1800s and early 1900s, and some of the city's most prominent residents lived there. Local politicians, attorneys, builders, doctors, and three presidents of Western New Mexico University owned homes in the neighborhood. The Queen Anne style, which was popular nationally during the district's development, predominates in the district. Many of the houses feature vernacular forms, such as the hipped box plan, with Queen Anne elements such as window detailing and frame porches. The district also includes several bungalows built in the 20th century.

The district was added to the National Register of Historic Places on February 17, 1983.

== See also ==
- National Register of Historic Places listings in Grant County, New Mexico
