= Ysabel Valencia House =

Historic house in New Mexico, United States

- U.S. National Register of Historic Places
- Location within New Mexico
- Nearest city: Mimbres, New Mexico
- Coordinates: 32°50′44″N 107°58′15″W
- Area: less than one acre
- Architectural style: Vernacular New Mexico
- MPS: Mimbres Valley MRA
- NRHP reference No.: 88000493
- Added to NRHP: May 16, 1988

The Ysabel Valencia House is a historic adobe farmhouse and barn in Mimbres, New Mexico. It was built in 1930 for Ysabel Valencia. It was designed in the Vernacular New Mexico architectural style, with a hipped roof. It has been listed on the National Register of Historic Places since May 16, 1988.
