= George O. Perrault House =

- U.S. National Register of Historic Places
- Location within New Mexico
- Nearest city: Sherman, New Mexico
- Coordinates: 32°44′49″N 107°53′15″W
- Area: less than one acre
- Built: 1870s-1880s
- Architectural style: I-house
- MPS: Mimbres Valley MRA
- NRHP reference No.: 88000507
- Added to NRHP: May 16, 1988

The George O. Perrault House, near Sherman, New Mexico, was built in the 1870s and 1880s. It was listed on the National Register of Historic Places in 1988.

It is located east of New Mexico State Road 61 about 1.7 miles (2.7 km) north of Mimbres Hot Springs Canyon Rd.

The property includes a building with one-story unstuccoed adobe section and two-story stuccoed adobe section, plus a barn (c.1940) and adobe walls which form an approximately 60 by 70 feet (18 m × 21 m) courtyard. The two-story portion appears to be based on Anglo I-house design, while the rest is Spanish-Mexican in style.

It was deemed significant in 1988 as "one of the earliest remaining buildings from the settlement of the Mimbres valley and as a good reminder of the importance of agriculture in the valley's economy; it [is also] an outstanding example of the introduction of Anglo-American design elements into the Hispanic building tradition of the region." An original dugout survives under the wood floor of a large room, the galera, at the northeast corner of the compound. The room was used for social events including dances, and is believed to have been where school was taught by Elizabeth McGregor before construction of the valley's first school buildings in the 1880s.

It was built by French-Canadian George 0. Perrault, the one non-Hispanic among nineteen miners from Pinos Altos who established San Lorenzo, Grant County, New Mexico in 1869. He surveyed fields then allotted to individual settlers, and in 1870 established his homestead five miles downriver. He led in construction of several irrigation ditches and had a prosperous farm. He served as a school commissioner and on the Grant County Commission. His orchard was the largest in the valley, but suffered loss of 2,000 to 2,500 trees in the 1902 flood.

According to the National Register nominator, "This house constructed in the 1870s and 1880s, along with two or three others in the valley, represent the first report of the I-house type in the Southwest to the author's knowledge. Its fusion with a courtyard house is a particularly fascination mixing of Anglo and Hispanic types which deserves further study."

It was listed on the National Register as part of a 1988 study of historic resources in the Mimbres Valley of Grant County.
