= Faywood, New Mexico =

- Census-designated place
- Location within New Mexico Location within the United States
- Coordinates: 32°37′30″N 107°52′24″W
- Country: United States
- State: New Mexico
- County: Grant

Area
  - Total: 0.53 sq mi (1.36 km^{2})
  - Land: 0.53 sq mi (1.36 km^{2})
  - Water: 0 sq mi (0.00 km^{2})
- Elevation: 5,217 ft (1,590 m)

Population (2020)
  - Total: 33
  - Density: 62.8/sq mi (24.24/km^{2})
- Time zone: UTC-7 (Mountain (MST))
  - Summer (DST): UTC-6 (MDT)
- ZIP code: 88034
- Area code: 575
- GNIS feature ID: 2584099

Faywood is a census-designated place in Grant County, New Mexico, United States. As of the 2020 census, Faywood had a population of 33. Faywood has a post office with ZIP code 88034. It is located 3 miles (4.8 km) north of US 180 on NM 61.

== History ==
The area was the site of hot springs which drew visitors from 1859, when a hotel and bath house was built by William Watts. By 1900, the Faywood settlement was created and named for the developers of the Faywood Hot Springs, J.C. Fay, William Lockwood. A third developer was T.C. McDermott. The post office was moved northeast to Dwyer, but is still named the Faywood Post Office.

== Climate ==
Faywood has a cool semi-arid climate (Köppen BSk) with hot summers and mild winters.

Climate data for Faywood, New Mexico (1991–2020 normals, extremes 1962–2013)
Month	Jan	Feb	Mar	Apr	May	Jun	Jul	Aug	Sep	Oct	Nov	Dec	Year
Record high °F (°C)	79 (26)	80 (27)	87 (31)	92 (33)	100 (38)	105 (41)	104 (40)	101 (38)	98 (37)	93 (34)	82 (28)	74 (23)	105 (41)
Mean maximum °F (°C)	68.2 (20.1)	72.1 (22.3)	78.8 (26.0)	85.0 (29.4)	93.2 (34.0)	100.1 (37.8)	98.9 (37.2)	95.7 (35.4)	91.5 (33.1)	86.6 (30.3)	76.6 (24.8)	68.4 (20.2)	101.1 (38.4)
Mean daily maximum °F (°C)	56.4 (13.6)	60.4 (15.8)	67.8 (19.9)	75.2 (24.0)	83.0 (28.3)	92.3 (33.5)	90.9 (32.7)	88.0 (31.1)	83.9 (28.8)	76.0 (24.4)	64.5 (18.1)	55.9 (13.3)	74.5 (23.6)
Daily mean °F (°C)	41.9 (5.5)	44.8 (7.1)	51.1 (10.6)	57.3 (14.1)	64.7 (18.2)	74.3 (23.5)	76.1 (24.5)	74.0 (23.3)	69.0 (20.6)	59.8 (15.4)	49.2 (9.6)	41.5 (5.3)	58.6 (14.8)
Mean daily minimum °F (°C)	27.4 (−2.6)	29.3 (−1.5)	34.4 (1.3)	39.3 (4.1)	46.4 (8.0)	56.2 (13.4)	61.4 (16.3)	59.9 (15.5)	54.2 (12.3)	43.6 (6.4)	33.8 (1.0)	27.0 (−2.8)	42.7 (5.9)
Mean minimum °F (°C)	17.1 (−8.3)	19.0 (−7.2)	22.3 (−5.4)	27.6 (−2.4)	35.5 (1.9)	46.8 (8.2)	55.0 (12.8)	54.2 (12.3)	44.3 (6.8)	30.8 (−0.7)	21.0 (−6.1)	14.9 (−9.5)	12.9 (−10.6)
Record low °F (°C)	3 (−16)	−2 (−19)	3 (−16)	17 (−8)	23 (−5)	35 (2)	44 (7)	40 (4)	30 (−1)	18 (−8)	8 (−13)	0 (−18)	−2 (−19)
Average precipitation inches (mm)	0.94 (24)	0.74 (19)	0.31 (7.9)	0.25 (6.4)	0.37 (9.4)	0.74 (19)	2.55 (65)	2.71 (69)	1.63 (41)	1.08 (27)	0.69 (18)	0.87 (22)	12.88 (327)
Average snowfall inches (cm)	0.3 (0.76)	0.3 (0.76)	0.0 (0.0)	0.0 (0.0)	0.0 (0.0)	0.0 (0.0)	0.0 (0.0)	0.0 (0.0)	0.0 (0.0)	0.0 (0.0)	0.0 (0.0)	1.2 (3.0)	1.8 (4.52)
Average precipitation days (≥ 0.01 inch)	3.4	3.7	2.1	1.2	1.3	2.5	8.7	8.9	4.4	4.3	2.3	3.7	46.5
Average snowy days (≥ 0.1 in)	0.2	0.1	0.0	0.0	0.0	0.0	0.0	0.0	0.0	0.0	0.0	0.3	0.6
Source: NOAA (snow/snow days 1981–2010)

== Demographics ==
Historical population
Census	Pop.	Note	%±
2020	33		—
U.S. Decennial Census

== See also ==
- City of Rocks State Park
- Faywood Hot Springs
- NAN Ranch, National Register of Historic Places
- NAN Ranch Ruin, archaeological site
- Swarts Ruin, Mimbres culture archaeological site
