= G. X. McSherry =

American politician

Member of the New Mexico House of Representatives from the 32nd district
- In office 1982–1998

Personal details
- Born: Grover Xavier McSherry; November 23, 1924 Dwyer, New Mexico, U.S.
- Died: May 5, 2013 (aged 88) Albuquerque, New Mexico, U.S.
- Party: Democratic

Grover Xavier "G.X." McSherry (November 23, 1924 – May 5, 2013) was an American farmer, rancher, and politician.

== Background ==
Born in Dwyer, New Mexico, McSherry was a farmer and rancher. He served in the New Mexico House of Representatives for the 32nd district from 1982 to 1998 as a Democrat.
