= Ken Brewer =

American poet and scholar

- Born: November 28, 1941; Indianapolis, Indiana, U.S.
- Died: March 15, 2006 (aged 64); Providence, Rhode Island, U.S.
- Occupation: Poet

Kenneth Wayne Brewer (November 28, 1941 – March 15, 2006) was an American poet and longtime scholar who resided in Utah, where he served as Poet Laureate. Born in Indianapolis, Indiana, he attended Butler University and Western New Mexico University in the 1960s, then earned a master's degree in English literature from New Mexico State University, followed by a Ph.D. from the University of Utah, where he worked with Pulitzer Prize winner Henry Taylor, in 1973. Since that time he taught a wide variety of courses at Utah State University, concentrating on mentoring creative writers at the graduate level, while publishing prolifically and speaking extensively. He died after a nine-month battle with pancreatic cancer.

== Publications ==
In over three decades at Utah State, Brewer published eight volumes of his poetry as well as more than individual 300 poems, essays and reviews in literary journals. Collections of his poetry may be found in

- The Place In Between, Limberlost Press, 1998
- Lake's Edge, Woodhedge Press, 1997
- Hoping for all, Dreading Nothing, Slanting Rain Press, 1994
- A Fine Art Book of Poems with Woodcuts by Harry Taylor
- To Remember What is Lost, USU Press, 1982 (ISBN 0-87421-114-X), 68pp. Re-issued in paperback, 1989 (ISBN 0-87421-143-3)
- The Collected Poems of Mongrel, Compost Press, 1981
- Round Again: A Cycle of Poems, published under a grant from the Utah Institute of Fine Arts, 1980
- Sum of Accidents, Chapbook Series, Alliance for the Varied Arts, 1977
- Places, Shadows, Dancing People, USU Monograph Series, Vol. XVII, No. 1, 1969, pp. 31–47, with Tom Lyons, Joyce Wood and Robert Wood.

== Reviews ==
- "His poems are direct, accessible and free of the arcane references or pretentious language that can make poetry feel elitist." — KUTV, Salt Lake City
- "achingly beautiful," composed of "spare and unimposing imagery and dialogue" — Starr Coulbrooke, quoted in Continuum
- "Utah Poet Laureate Ken Brewer is known for his fine poetry and his wicked sense of humor" — Michael Shay
- "luminously gifted ... a man who writes of passion and earth-tending in a chunk of America in which it has begun to seem that the only passion burning for the earth is about profit" — Mary Sojourner, in Mountain Gazette
