= Battle of the Mimbres River =

- Part of the Apache Wars
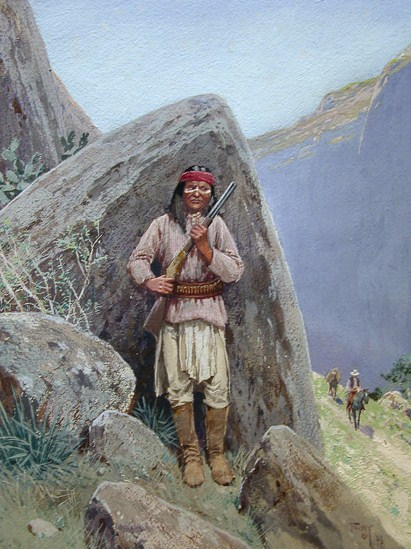
- An Apache Warrior by William F. Farny.
Date	December 4, 1860
Location	Mimbres River, New Mexico Territory
Result	United States Victory

Belligerents
United States	Apache

Commanders and leaders
(United States) James Henry Tevis	Mangas Coloradas

Strength
30 militia	Unknown

Casualties and losses
Unknown	4 killed
- Civilian Casualties: 13 captured

The Battle of the Mimbres River was a surprise attack launched by a troop of American militia against an encampment of Chiricahua Apaches along the western shore of the Mimbres River.

On December 4, 1860, a force of thirty armed miners led by James Henry Tevis attacked at sunrise, claiming it was retaliation for stolen livestock. The surprised Apaches, led by Mangas Coloradas, were quickly defeated in a short close quarters action. Four warriors were killed, and an unknown number were wounded. The settlers' casualties are unknown, if any at all. Thirteen women and children were captured and several warriors fled, leaving their families behind. Mangas Coloradas survived. The Americans recovered some of their livestock.

== See also ==
- American Indian Wars
- Capture of Tucson (1862)
