= Sherman, New Mexico =

Unincorporated community in New Mexico, United States

- Unincorporated community
- Location within New Mexico Location within the United States
- Coordinates: 32°44′48″N 107°53′11″W
- Country: United States
- State: New Mexico
- County: Grant
- Elevation: 5,545 ft (1,690 m)
- Time zone: UTC-7 (Mountain (MST))
  - Summer (DST): UTC-6 (MDT)
- Area code: 575
- GNIS feature ID: 899913

Sherman is an unincorporated community in Grant County, New Mexico, United States. Sherman is located on New Mexico State Road 61, 23 miles (37 km) east of Silver City.

The George O. Perrault House and the San Juan Teacherage, which are listed on the National Register of Historic Places, are located in Sherman.
