= Fleming Hall =

- U.S. National Register of Historic Places
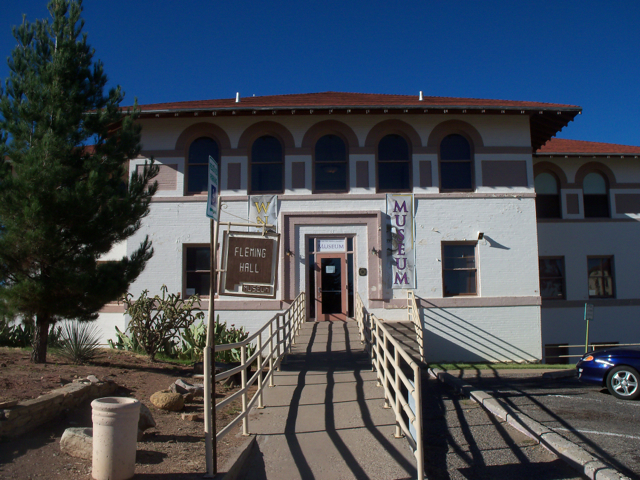
- Fleming Hall in 2013

- Location within New Mexico
- Location: 10th Street NE of Bowden Hall, WNMU, Silver City, New Mexico
- Coordinates: 32°46′36″N 108°16′55″W
- Area: 0.1 acres (0.040 ha)
- Built: 1917
- Architect: Trost & Trost
- Architectural style: Mission Revival
- MPS: New Mexico Campus Buildings Built 1906--1937 TR
- NRHP reference No.: 88001553
- Added to NRHP: September 22, 1988

Fleming Hall is a historic building on the campus of Western New Mexico University in Silver City, New Mexico. It was built in 1917 as a facility to teach Science and Physical Education. It was remodelled as the university museum and alumni hall in 1973. The building was designed in the Mission Revival architectural style by Trost & Trost. It has been listed on the National Register of Historic Places since September 22, 1988.
