= Silver City Water Works Building =

- U.S. National Register of Historic Places
- NM State Register of Cultural Properties
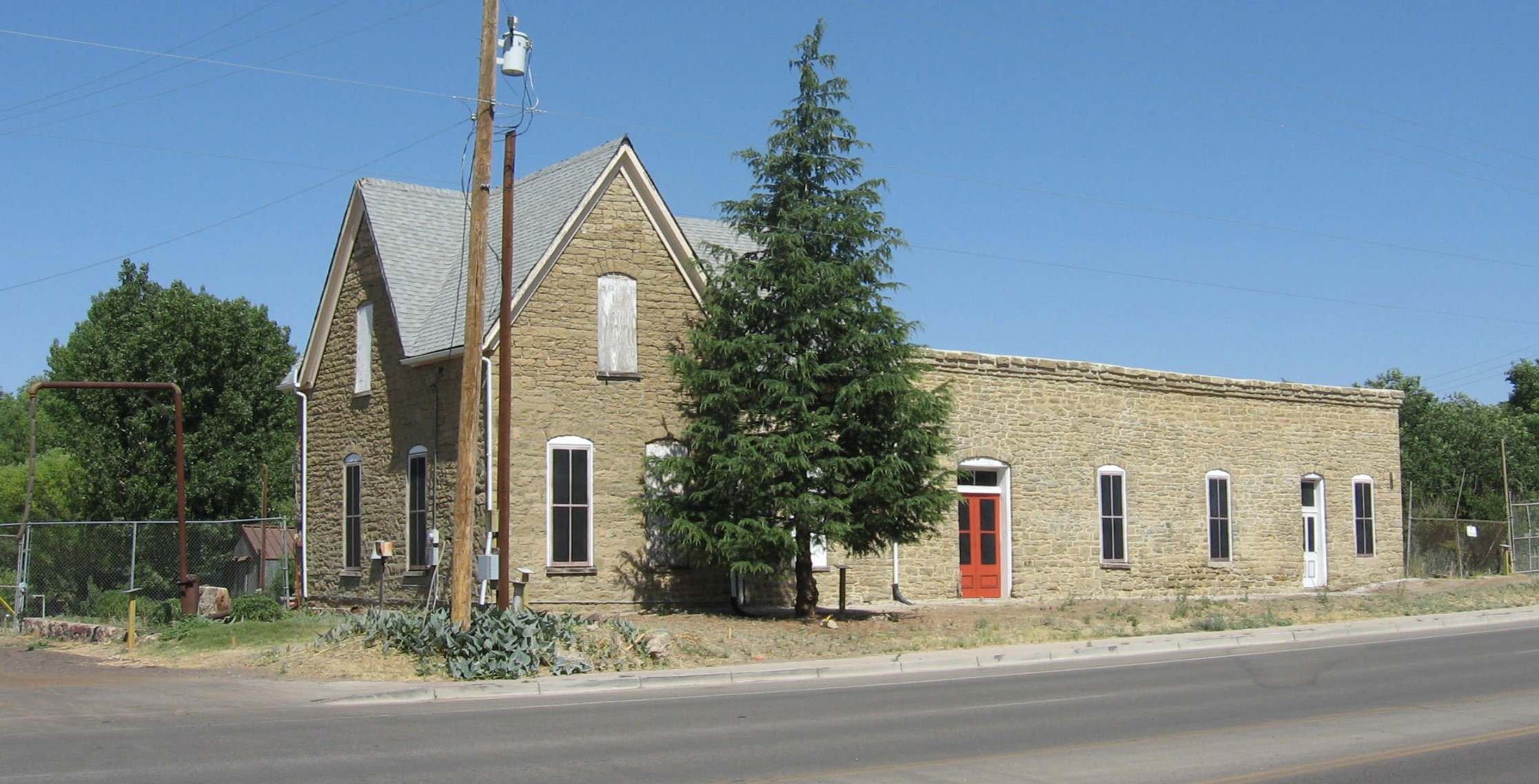

- Location within New Mexico Location within the United States
- Location: Little Walnut Rd., Silver City, New Mexico
- Coordinates: 32°47′00″N 108°16′44″W
- Area: less than one acre
- Built: 1886
- Built by: John Hill
- NRHP reference No.: 84002950
- NMSRCP No.: 916

Significant dates
- Added to NRHP: January 26, 1984
- Designated NMSRCP: January 14, 1983

The Silver City Water Works Building is a historic building located on Little Walnut Rd. in Silver City, New Mexico, United States. The building was constructed in 1887 to provide Silver City with a municipal water system. While the city had established an electrical system and telegraph connections, it lacked reliable drinking water and a fire prevention system, as an earlier attempt to build a water system was never completed. George H. Utter obtained a contract to supply water to Silver City in 1886, and he commissioned Michigan stonemason John Hill to build the water works. The sandstone water works is the only sandstone building from the 1800s in Silver City, as brick was a much more common building material. While the water system opened and initially operated successfully, by 1890 Utter was accused of supplying undrinkable water and failing to meet the city's expectations for service. East Coast investors Henry and Thomas Foster took over the water works in the ensuing years after an extended legal battle with Utter.

The building was listed on the National Register of Historic Places in 1984.

== See also ==
- National Register of Historic Places listings in Grant County, New Mexico
