= H. B. Ailman House =

Historic house in New Mexico, United States

- U.S. National Register of Historic Places
- NM State Register of Cultural Properties
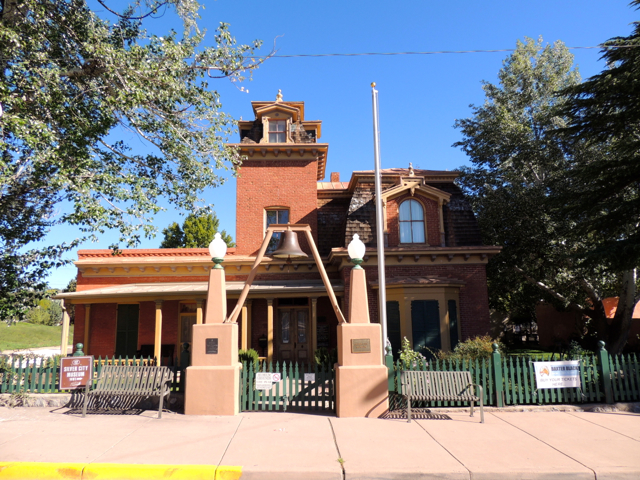

- Location within New Mexico Location within the United States
- Location: 314 W. Broadway, Silver City, New Mexico
- Coordinates: 32°46′12″N 108°16′40″W
- Area: less than one acre
- Built: 1881
- Built by: Robert Black
- Architectural style: Victorian
- NRHP reference No.: 75001163
- NMSRCP No.: 186

Significant dates
- Added to NRHP: May 12, 1975
- Designated NMSRCP: May 22, 1970

The H. B. Ailman House is a historic house located at 314 W. Broadway in Silver City, New Mexico. Prospector Henry B. Ailman had the house built using his profits from the Naiad Queen Silver Mine in Georgetown; his business partner H. M. Meredith built an identical house next door, which has since been disassembled and reassembled nearby.The brick Victorian house features a 2 1/2-story square turret, which Ailman used to watch for Apache attacks on Silver City. Ailman and Meredith attempted to found a bank in Silver City, but it failed in 1887; Ailman's house changed owners several times in the following decades. The city took ownership of the house in 1926 and made it the new City Hall. The house became a firehouse after a new city hall was constructed. In 1967, the Silver City Museum opened in the house. The property today remains in operation as a historic house museum.

The house was added to the National Register of Historic Places on May 12, 1975.

== See also ==
- National Register of Historic Places listings in Grant County, New Mexico
