= Bullard Hotel =

- U.S. National Register of Historic Places
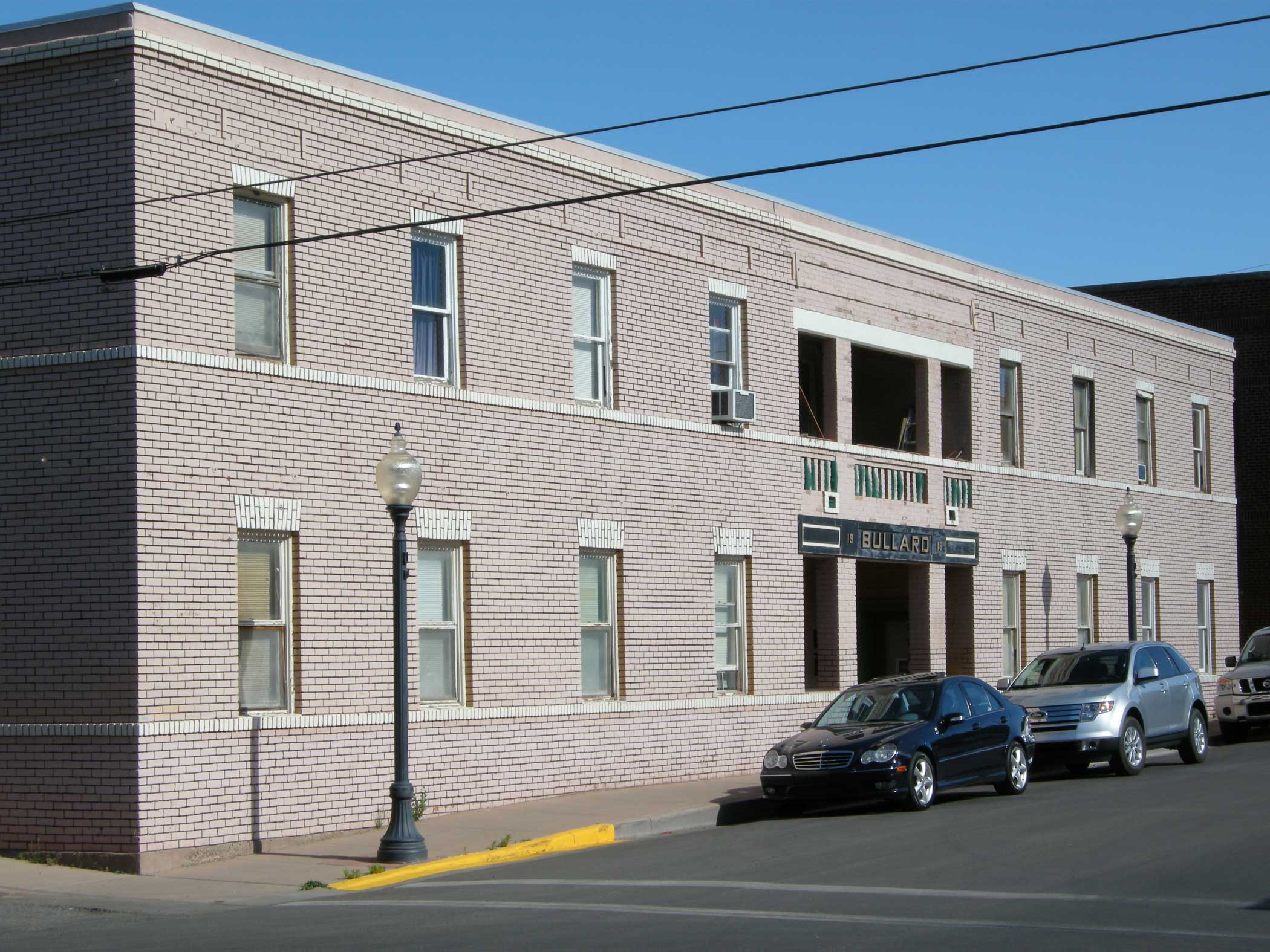

- Location within New Mexico
- Location: 105 S. Bullard St., Silver City, New Mexico
- Coordinates: 32°46′12″N 108°16′33″W
- Area: 1 acre (0.40 ha)
- Built: 1916
- Built by: Gilbert, Hugh S.
- Architectural style: Late 19th And Early 20th Century American Movements, Commercial Style
- NRHP reference No.: 88000435
- Added to NRHP: July 11, 1988

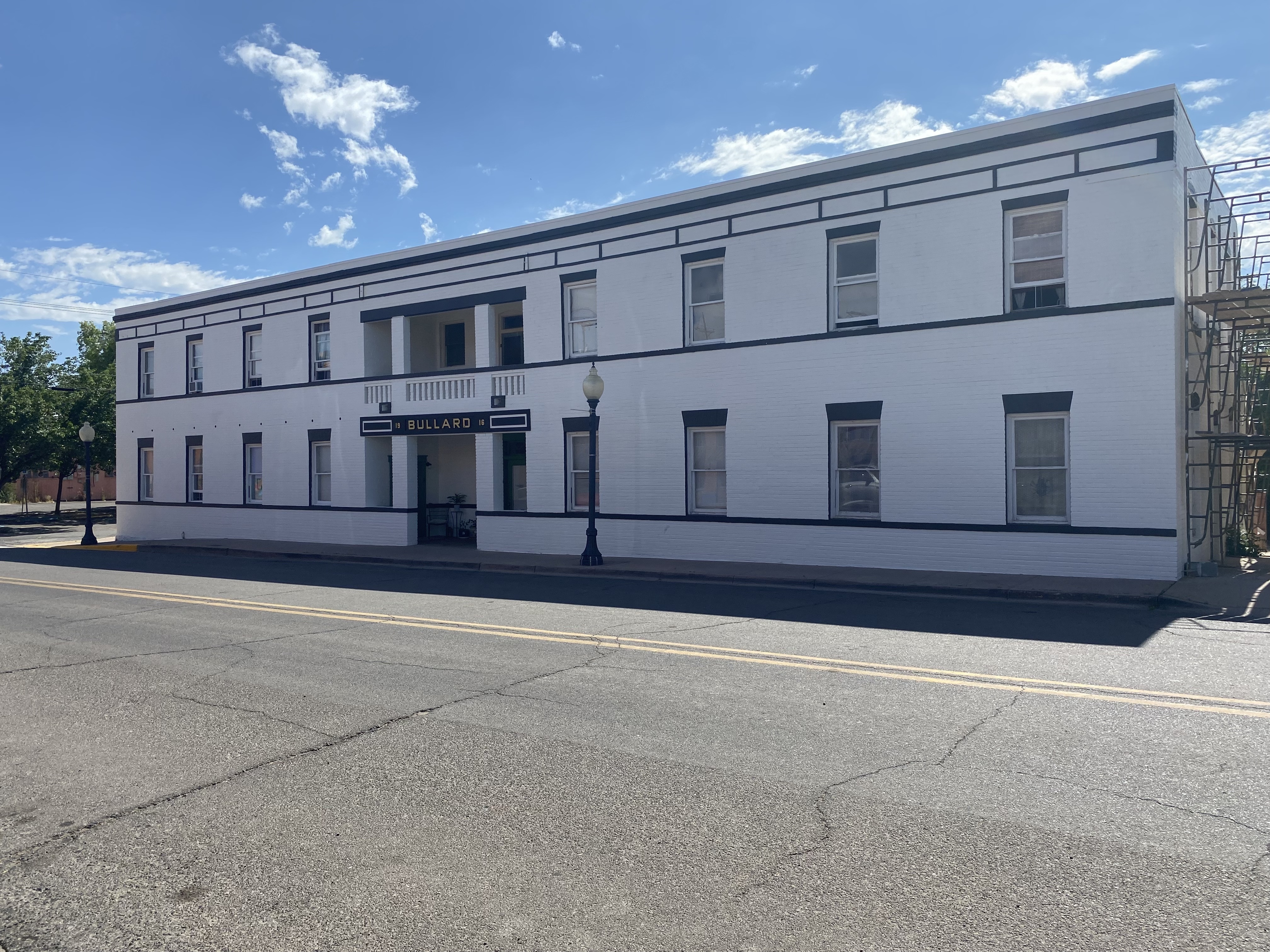
The Bullard, July 2023

The Bullard Hotel, at 105 S. Bullard St. in Silver City, New Mexico, was built in 1916. It was listed on the National Register of Historic Places in 1988.

It was built by contractor Hugh S. Gilbert.

It is Early Commercial architecture in style.

Building History Built after the completion of a new railroad depot a block south of it in 1915, the Bullard Hotel opened for business in March, 1916. It was touted as Silver City's most modern hotel, with steam heat and hot and cold running water in every room. Mr. and Mrs. Thomas W. Ward, owners, were from Illinois and already ran a successful grocery business in Silver City. Mrs. Ward took over management of the hotel, which continued to function as such for the next fifty years. The contract for the Ward's hotel went to Hugh S. Gilbert. From the time Gilbert came to Silver City in 1905 until his death in 1957, he was a contractor in Silver City. He built and remodelled private homes and public buildings. Later in 1916 Gilbert built Fleming Hall, still standing on Western New Mexico University campus, from plans by Henry Trost, an architect based in El Paso. It is possible to infer Trost's influence on the unique entryway that Gilbert constructed in the Bullard Hotel, but no conclusive evidence is known. Recent research indicates that a narrow, two-story brick structure with a single-story rear wing, known as the Palace Hotel when it was constructed in 1883, was incorporated into the Bullard Hotel. The brick in this portion of the building is markedly different from the brick used in 1916. The two second-story windows in the rear have been altered, but retain their segmental arch tops and plain wood surrounds. A frame addition was added to the one-story portion sometime later.

The Bullard Hotel played an important role in the economy of Silver City, especially in the first few years after it was built and before the economy began to slacken in Silver City during World War I. In its setting, it is still an imposing representative of the early twentieth century history of Silver City.

The Bullard Hotel is significant because it is one of the remaining representatives of the last economic boom in Silver City through World War I. And, it is the only remaining hotel of this last economic boom. The transportation and lodging industries hummed with people seeking silver, health and education. In line with the hopes of the time, the Bullard Hotel was built on a grand scale, with two stories and some thirty rooms for lodging. Changes in the architectural landscape were taking place all over town: shopowners and homeowners desired to modernize. Silver City was modernizing also for the use of automobiles by paving streets and installing a storm sewer. The Bullard Hotel was built at a time when town developers hoped for continuation of growth, while new trends were about to change life in Silver City forever.

Historic Context: In the 1870s southwestern New Mexico was an undeveloped territory inhabited by a few miners, a few soldiers and some very determined Apaches. The Apaches had prevented any permanent settlement, although enterprising individuals had been moving through the area for years. Copper was mined at Santa Rita as early as 1802; the Gila River was trapped for beaver in the 1820s; and in 1860 gold was discovered at present-day Pinos Altos. Pinos Altos did not become permanent until 1866, when the Ft. Bayard military post was established. Another mineral discovery about fifty miles to the southwest of Pinos Altos, at Ralston, was the key to the discovery of silver at San Vicente Cienega, which was the early name for present Silver City.

Sheepherders and woodcutters had probably used the site as a summer camp since the early 1800s; with the rush to Pinos Altos farmers and herders had economic incentive to stay. John Bullard, a member of a group of Americans that had established a farm at Silver City, is said to be person who recognized outcroppings near the camp at Silver City from silver ore he had seen at Ralston. When Silver City was founded in 1870, hopeful silver miners were flocking to the "Silver Flat Mining District." Those who had already started mining the native silver ore were living in log cabins and adobe huts. Very quickly it was discovered that native clay in the area was suitable for the manufacture of brick, and builders jumped at the chance to use this material.

While off to a promising start, Silver City had to find the solutions to some important problems before it could blossom into a more established town. One of these problems was technological: the reduction of silver ore. Although successfully reduced in adobe furnaces in 1870, the ore required newer milling and reduction machinery for an improved recovery rate to nudge the town to greater prosperity. The other problem was cultural, and required coming to terms with the Apaches. Silver City was deep in Apache territory By the time the last Apache leader, Geronimo, surrendered in 1886, Silver City had become a substantial town. In 1880 a town ordinance was passed prohibiting the construction of frame buildings in the city limits. Construction henceforth would discourage fire and add the solidity of brick and adobe to the city landscape. In 1883 a branch line of the Atchison, Topeka and Santa Fe Railroad reached Silver City and a new era in building began. New and desirable building materials now reached Silver City by rail. Coinciding with the economic prosperity of the time, buildings on a grander scale went up, most notable large hotels. Large numbers of people visited Silver City for sessions of district court, held twice a year. As a commercial and judicial center for southwestern New Mexico, Silver City had always accommodated out-of-town miners and ranchers. Now the railroad increased the number of travellers still more. Silver City's development based on the local mineral resources suffered in the late 1880s and during the '90s from recessions and the devaluation of silver. The town looked to education and medicine for growth. A large brick building to house the New Mexico Normal School, forerunner of today's Western New Mexico University, was built in 1896. (This building was destroyed in the 1950s.) Numbers of tubercular patients came to Silver City in the early 1900s, increasing the amount of travellers needing temporary quarters while visiting OP searching for long-term lodging.

The high altitude and dry climate proved curative. St. Joseph's Sanatorium, 1902, was a large brick affair, as were many homes built by healthseekers who came and stayed. In fact, healthseekers doubled the population between 1900 and 1907. This "industry" continued at a lively pace until after World War I.

The Bullard Hotel stands today at the south end of Bullard Street, near a warehouse section which sprang up around the old railroad depot. The depot was located at the south end of Bullard Street in 1883, but was moved to the north end of town two years later. When the train depot was moved back to its original site in 1900, merchants needing nearby storage space began constructing warehouses. Although the train depot was torn down in 1975, a few warehouses remain in this part of town. The turn of the century saw another alteration in the downtown area, one which actually commenced in 1895. That was the year the first heavy flooding rolled down Main Street, (San Vicente Arroyo) carrying off pieces of the Broadway Hotel. In 1899 another hotel, the Tremont House, was destroyed by flooding. Flash floods returned yet again in 1902, and every year for the next four years, destroying many of Silver City's oldest business buildings. Another hotel, the Timmer House, fell to the onslaught in 1904. Downtown Silver City was changed forever by the loss of Main Street and three of its old hotels. Two hotels from the late 1800s, the Palace and the Southern, remained standing after the demise of the Timmer House. The Palace was incorporated into the Bullard Hotel in 1916, and the Southern was torn down in the early 1960s.

The Bullard Hotel was built in 1916, when optimism was high. Silver City anticipated continuing growth from the influx of healthseekers and new developments in the mining industry. A new railroad depot was constructed and the town paved streets and installed a storm sewer The modernization of buildings meant small, multiple-lite windows were replaced by plate glass in store fronts and simple adobe homes received new gable and hipped roofs. Even old mansions were remodelled in favor of new styles. No one could know that the aftermath of World War I would bring a cure for tuberculosis, or that the automobile in Silver City would eventually replace the train.
