= Pinos Altos Historic District =

Historic district in New Mexico, United States

- U.S. National Register of Historic Places
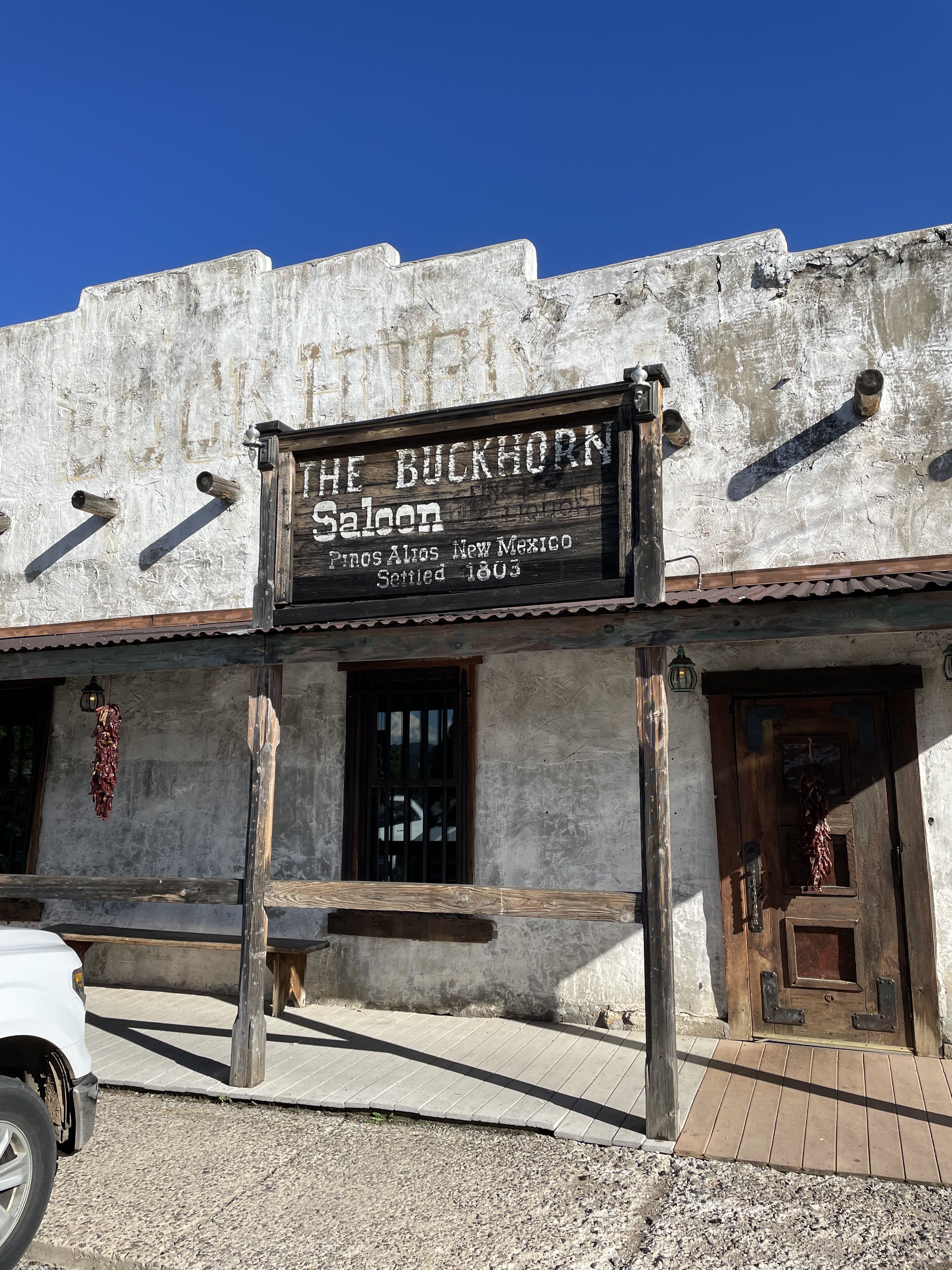
- Buckhorn Saloon

- Location within New Mexico
- Location: Roughly bounded by Gold Ave. and Cherry, Main, Church, and Silver Sts., Pinos Altos, New Mexico
- Coordinates: 32°51′58″N 108°13′09″W
- Area: 72 hectares (180 acres)
- Built: 1860
- NRHP reference No.: 84002945
- Added to NRHP: May 21, 1984

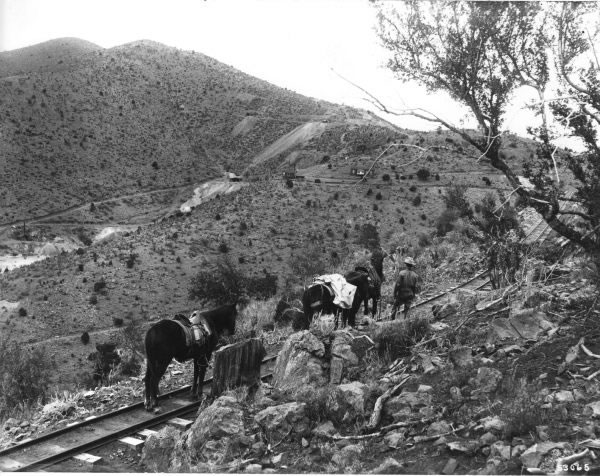
Pinos Altos Railroad

The Pinos Altos Historic District is a historic district which was listed on the National Register of Historic Places in 1984. It includes 37 contributing buildings on 72 hectares (180 acres).

It is roughly bounded by Gold Ave. and Cherry, Main, Church, and Silver Streets.

It was a gold camp in the 1800s. It is located on the Continental Divide, at elevation 7,067 feet (2,154 m), in the Pinos Altos Mountains. The first house there was built in 1860, had a dirt roof, and still survived in 1929.

Two log buildings, both built of square hewn logs, are in the district:

- the Pinos Altos School, on Main Street, the first school in Pinos Altos, assertedly built in 1866
- the John McDonald cabin, on Spring Street, also probably built in the 1860s.
