= Chihuahua Hill Historic District =

Historic district in New Mexico, United States

- U.S. National Register of Historic Places
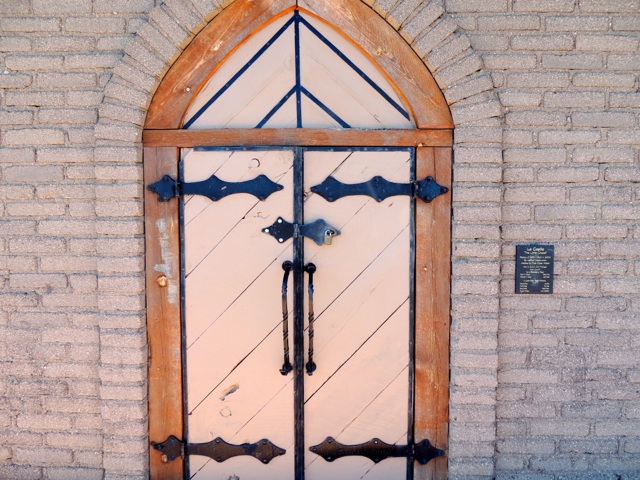
- Door of La Capilla Chapel

- Location within New Mexico
- Location: Bounded by Cooper, Spring, Bullard, and Chihuahua Sts., Silver City, New Mexico
- Coordinates: 32°46′01″N 108°16′43″W
- Area: 30 acres (12 ha)
- Built: 1870
- NRHP reference No.: 84002943
- Added to NRHP: January 23, 1984

The Chihuahua Hill Historic District, in Silver City, New Mexico, is a 30 acres (12 ha) historic district which was listed on the National Register of Historic Places in 1984.

It is bounded by Cooper, Spring, Bullard, and Chihuahua Streets, and dates back to 1870. It includes 73 contributing buildings.

It was the "original 'Mexican village' of Silver City of the 1880s" and it was still primarily populated by Spanish-surname families in 1982.
