= New Mexico State Road 90 =

State highway in New Mexico, United States

State Road 90

Route information
- Maintained by NMDOT
- Length: 42.770 mi (68.832 km)

Major junctions
- South end: US 70 near Lordsburg
- North end: US 180 in Silver City

Location
- Country: United States
- State: New Mexico
- Counties: Hidalgo, Grant

Highway system
- New Mexico State Highway System; Interstate; US; State; Scenic
← NM 89	→ NM 91

State Road 90 (NM 90) is a state highway in the US state of New Mexico. Its total length is approximately 42.8 miles (68.9 km). NM 90's southern terminus is at U.S. Route 70 (US 70) north of Lordsburg, and the northern terminus is in Silver City at US 180.

== Major intersections ==
County	Location	mi	km	Destinations	Notes
Hidalgo		0.000	0.000	US 70	Southern terminus
Grant	Silver City	42.770	68.832	US 180	Northern terminus
1.000 mi = 1.609 km; 1.000 km = 0.621 mi
