= San Juan, New Mexico =

- CDP
- Nickname: San Juan Pueblo
- Location of San Juan
- Coordinates: 36°03′10″N 106°04′14″W
- Country: United States
- State: New Mexico
- County: Rio Arriba

Area
  - Total: 0.58 sq mi (1.5 km^{2})
  - Land: 0.58 sq mi (1.5 km^{2})
  - Water: 0 sq mi (0.0 km^{2})
- Elevation: 5,656 ft (1,724 m)

Population (2000)
  - Total: 592
  - Density: 1,036/sq mi (399.9/km^{2})
- Time zone: UTC-7 (Mountain (MST))
  - Summer (DST): UTC-6 (MDT)
- Area code: 505
- FIPS code: 35-68705
- GNIS feature ID: 928804

San Juan or San Juan Pueblo is a census-designated place (CDP) in Rio Arriba County, New Mexico, United States. Its population was 592 at the 2000 census.

== Geography ==
San Juan is located a few miles north of Española. According to the United States Census Bureau, the CDP has a total area of 0.6 square mile (1.5 km^{2}), all land.

== Demographics ==
As of the census of 2000, 592 people, 193 households, and 152 families were residing in the CDP. The population density was 1,035.8 inhabitants per square mile (399.9/km^{2}). The 227 housing units had an average density of 397.2 per square mile (153.4/km^{2}). The racial makeup of the CDP was 4.05% White, 0.34% African American, 84.97% Native American, 0.17% Asian, 7.60% from other races, and 2.87% from two or more races. Hispanics or Latinos of any race were 27.03% of the population.

Of the 193 households, 39.9% had children under 18 living with them, 40.9% were married couples living together, 27.5% had a female householder with no husband present, and 21.2% were not families. About 19.2% of all households were made up of individuals, and 6.2% had someone living alone who was 65 or older. The average household size was 3.06 and the average family size was 3.39.

In the CDP, the age distribution was 31.4% under 18, 8.6% from 18 to 24, 29.7% from 25 to 44, 19.4% from 45 to 64, and 10.8% who were 65 or older. The median age was 32 years. For every 100 females, there were 86.8 males. For every 100 females 18 and over, there were 76.5 males.

The median income for a household in the CDP was $26,667, and for a family was $27,500. Males had a median income of $22,721 versus $19,250 for females. The per capita income for the CDP was $10,568. About 19.3% of families and 25.6% of the population were below the poverty line, including 40.4% of those under 18 and 14.9% of those 65 or over.

== See also ==
- Ohkay Owingeh, New Mexico
- United States v. Sandoval
