= Dwyer, New Mexico =

- Unincorporated community
- Location within New Mexico Location within the United States
- Coordinates: 32°37′42″N 107°52′01″W
- Country: United States
- State: New Mexico
- County: Grant
- Elevation: 5,200 ft (1,600 m)
- Time zone: UTC-7 (Mountain (MST))
  - Summer (DST): UTC-6 (MDT)
- Area code: 575
- GNIS feature ID: 920591

Dwyer is an unincorporated community in Grant County, New Mexico, United States. It is located southeast of Silver City, along the Mimbres River, and on NM 61. It is close to the Mexican border

== History ==
The settlement, first known as San Jose for its church, had a post office from 1895 to 1917. The post office in Dwyer was moved northeast from Faywood is still named the Faywood Post Office and the settlement was renamed Dwyer for an 1883 homesteader, G.W. Dwyer.

== Notable person ==
- G. X. McSherry, farmer, rancher, and member of the New Mexico House of Representatives

== See also ==
- NAN Ranch, National Register of Historic Places
- NAN Ranch Ruin, archaeological site
- Swarts Ruin, Mimbres culture archaeological site
