= Western New Mexico University =

Public university in Silver City, New Mexico, U.S.

- Motto: Transforming The Future Together
- Type: Public university
- Established: 1893; 133 years ago
- Affiliations: CONAHEC
- President: Joseph Coll
- Students: Approx 3,500
- Location: Silver City, New Mexico, United States; 32°46′36″N 108°17′02″W
- Campus: Rural
- Colors: Royal Purple and Gold
- Nickname: Mustangs
- Mascot: Rawhide
- Website: www.wnmu.edu

Western New Mexico University is a public university in Silver City, New Mexico, United States. It was founded in 1893.

== History ==
Founded in the Territory of New Mexico on February 11, 1893, as the New Mexico Normal School, the school began to offer classes on September 3, 1894, in a rented Presbyterian church. On June 2, 1893, the nascent board of regents accepted 20 acres (81,000 m^{2}) of Town of Silver City land situated on a hillside overlooking the town donated by Regent, and Mayor of the Town of Silver City, Colonel John W. Fleming. In November 1896, the school's first permanent building, Old Main, was dedicated, and within twenty years enrollment had reached nearly 500 students.

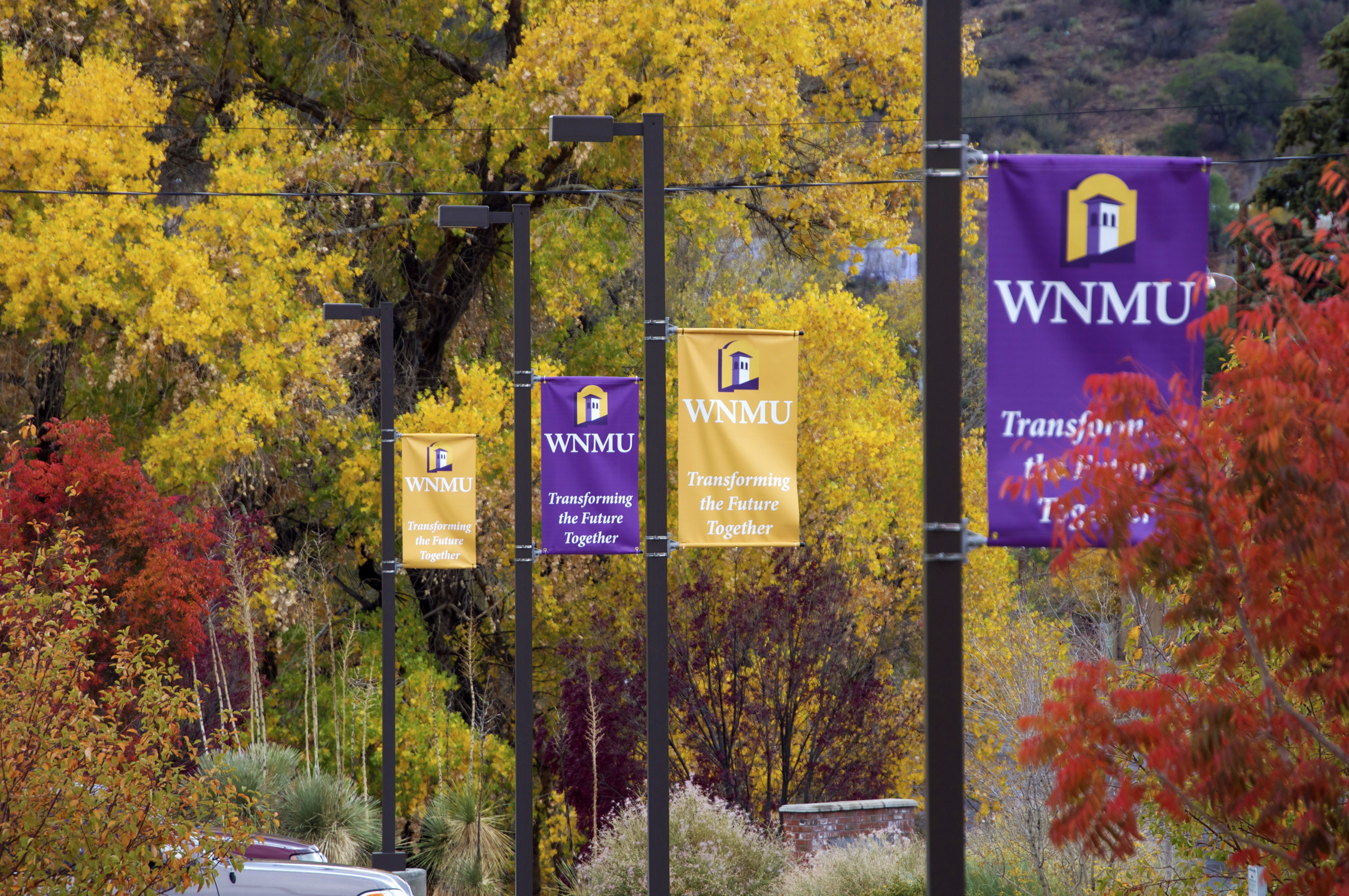
Fall 2012

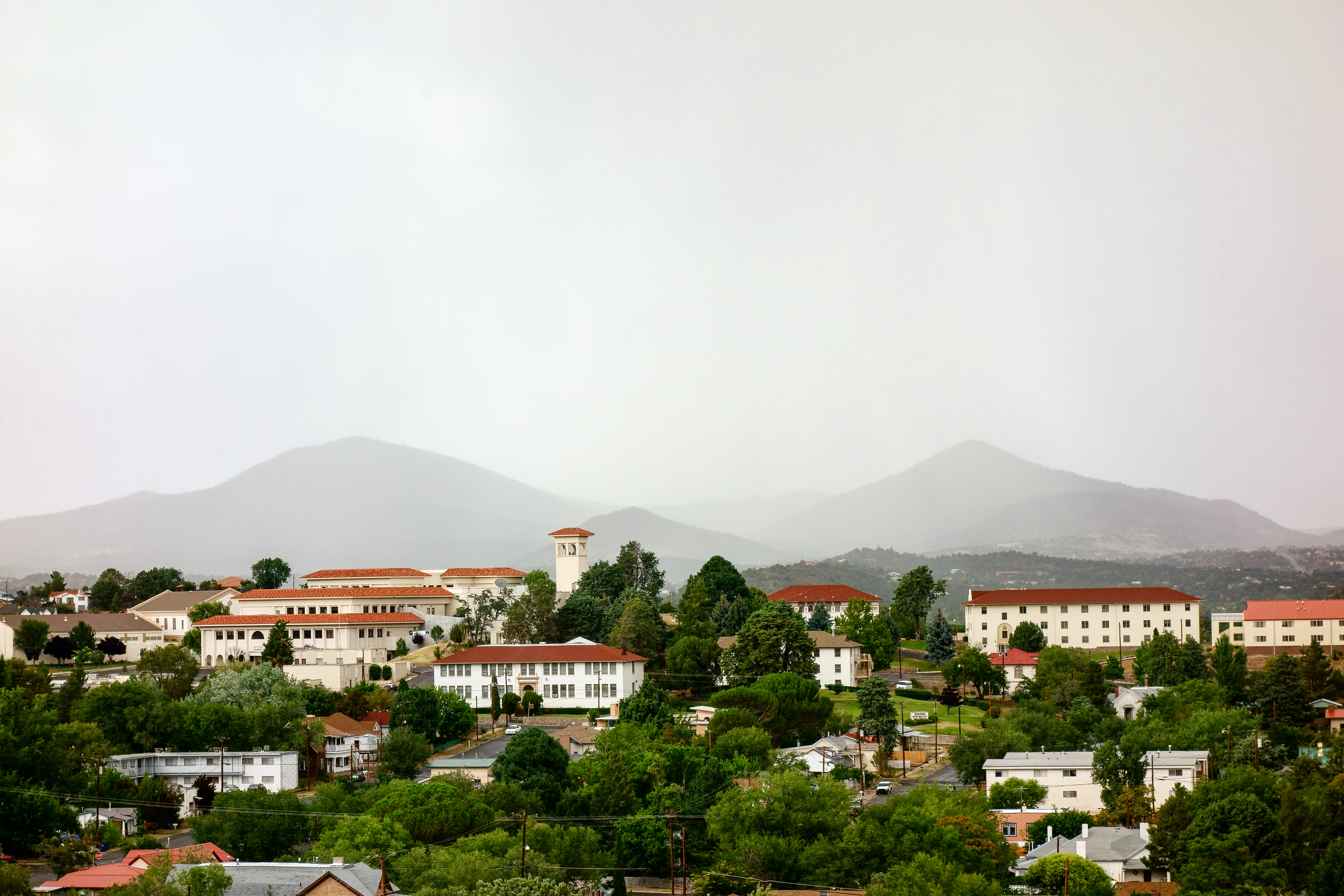
Main Campus

== Academics ==
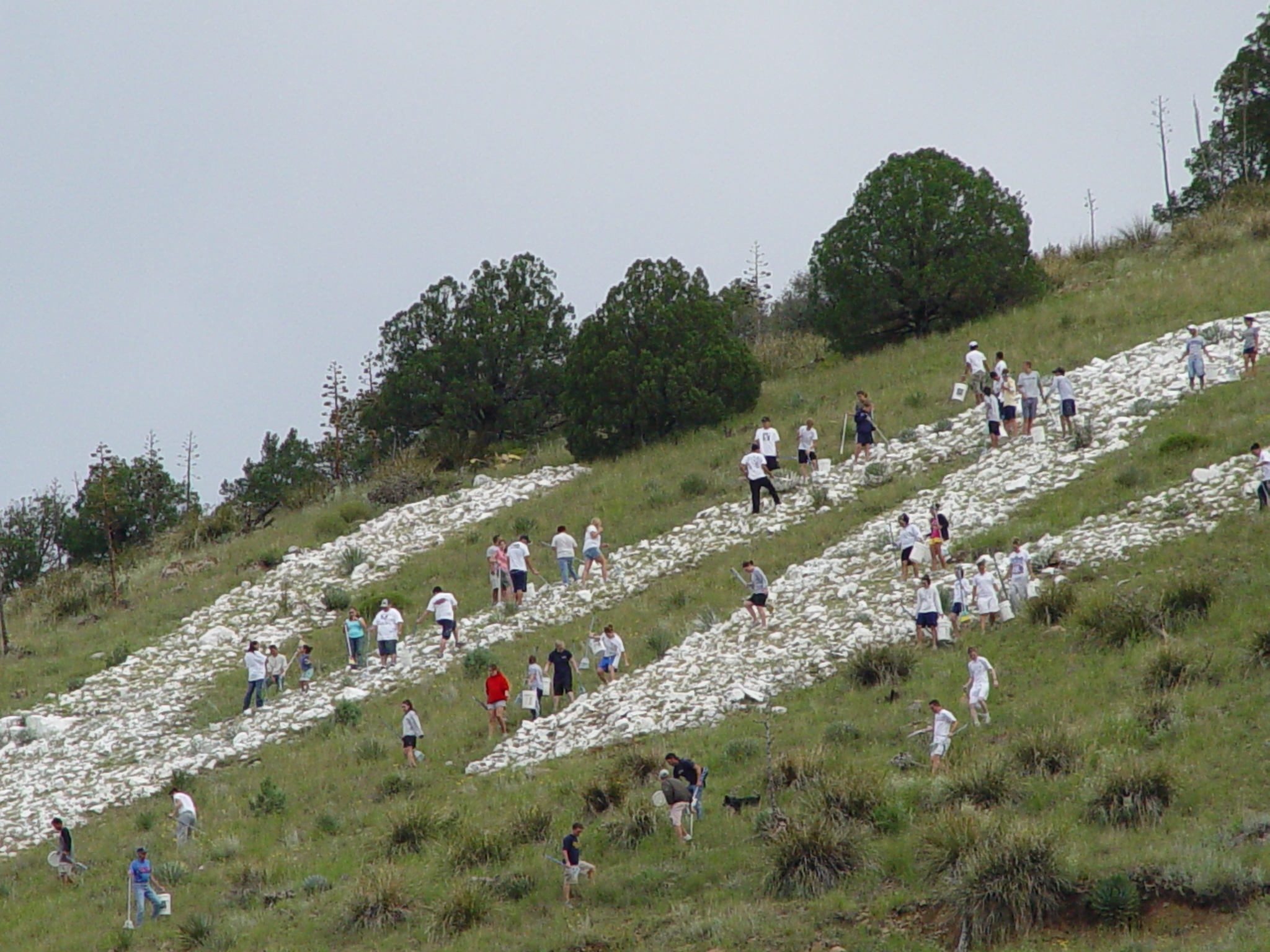
Paint the W

WNMU offers more than 150 areas of study that include workforce tech and allied health certificate programs, associate and bachelor's degrees as well as graduate programs. Fields of study include accounting, business, chemistry, criminal justice, education, environmental sustainability, forest/wildlife, graphic design, history, nursing, occupational therapy, psychology, social work, sociology, and zoology.

In fall of 2024, enrollment was over 3,500 students. The student-to-faculty ratio is 18:1.

In addition to its Silver City location, WNMU's Gallup Graduate Studies Center is located in Gallup, New Mexico. The center offers Master of Arts programs in counseling and educational leadership, as well as Master of Arts in Teaching programs in elementary, secondary and special education. Courses leading to teaching endorsements in bilingual education and TESOL, as well as New Mexico Alternative Teaching Licensure in elementary, secondary and special education are also available.

The WNMU Deming campus supports the university's School of Nursing and allied heath certificate programs.

More than 150 courses are offered online. Online degrees include the Master of Arts in interdisciplinary studies, Bachelor of Social Work, Master of Social Work, Master of Business Administration, and bachelor's degrees in criminal justice, nursing and rehabilitation services.

Western New Mexico University is accredited by the Higher Learning Commission.

== Athletics ==
Athletics teams are nicknamed the Mustangs and compete in several sports such as football, volleyball, tennis, softball, basketball, cross country, and golf.

Western New Mexico is a member of the NCAA Division II Lone Star Conference, which they joined during the 2016–17 school year. Prior to joining the Lone Star Conference, Western New Mexico competed as a member of the Rocky Mountain Athletic Conference (RMAC) from 1967 to 1990, and then from 2006 to 2016. Prior re-joining the RMAC, WNMU also competed as an NCAA D-II Independent from 1990 to 1998, and the Pacific West Conference from 1998 to 2005, and later the Heartland Conference during the 2005–06 school year.

== Campus life ==
Undergraduate demographics as of Fall 2023
Race and ethnicity	Total
Hispanic	57%
White	26%
American Indian/Alaska Native	5%
Black	4%
International student	3%
Two or more races	3%
Asian	1%
Unknown	1%
Economic diversity
Low-income (Note: The percentage of students who received an income-based federal Pell grant intended for low-income students.)	54%
Affluent (Note: The percentage of students who are a part of the American middle class at the bare minimum.)	46%

The WNMU campus is a hybrid of registered historic buildings and modern facilities with LEED certifications. The 80-acre (32 ha) campus includes over 40 buildings with four residence halls, a nearly 1000 seat Fine Arts Center Theater, swimming pool and football field. Students have access to a fitness center and a campus movie theater. A long-held tradition, The Great Race, was created in 1967 and is celebrated each spring. Students form teams and compete against each other in go cart races for one week. Each fall, new students climb W Mountain and paint the W during the first week of the new school year.

== University museum ==
Housed in Fleming Hall, the WNMU Museum is home to the largest permanent collection of Mimbres pottery in the world. The WNMU Museum is the foremost center for the viewing and research of the Mimbres culture.

== WNMU satellite campuses ==
- Deming
- Gallup

== Notable alumni ==
- Vernon Asbill, educator and former member of the New Mexico Senate
- Richard Angulo, former WNMU Mustang football player (1998–2002), was a tight-end with the NFL teams the Jacksonville Jaguars and the Chicago Bears.
- Kenneth Wayne Brewer, American poet, longtime scholar, and former poet laureate of Utah.
- Howie Morales, lieutenant governor of New Mexico and former state senator; earned a Master of Arts degree in bilingual education in 1998.
- Carleton Naiche-Palmer, former president of the Mescalero Apache (2008–2010). Earned a BBA degree in 1974.
- Tammie Jo Shults, former United States Navy F/A-18 naval aviator and captain of Southwest Airlines Flight 1380
- Jerry D. Thompson, historian of the American Southwest, received his Bachelor of Arts degree in history from WNMU.
- Jacob Worley (B.S., zoology and botany, 1995), bishop of Cascadia
