= Mimbres River =

Mimbres
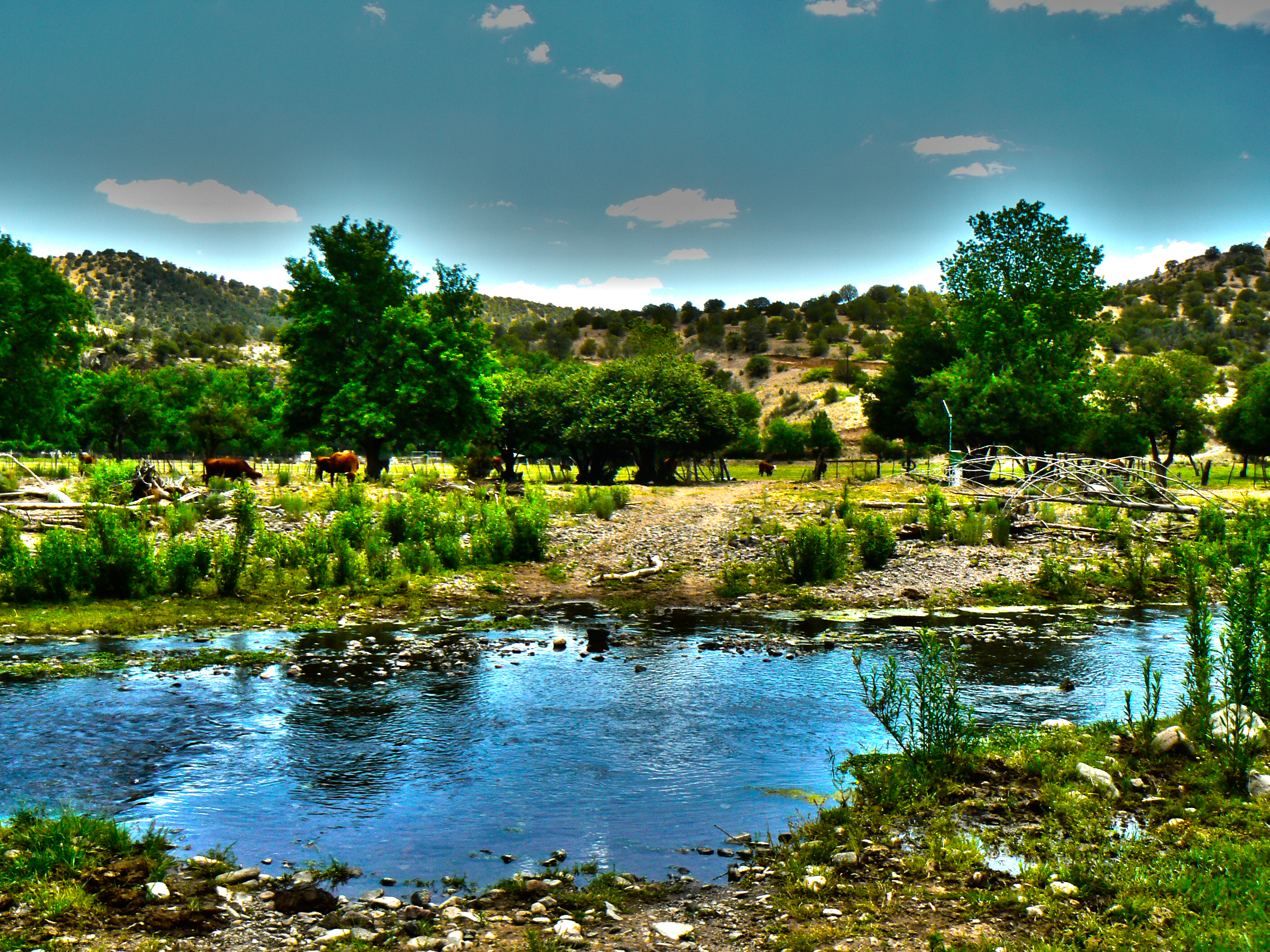

Location
- Country: United States
- State: New Mexico

Physical characteristics
- Source: Black Range
  - coordinates: 33°06′58″N 107°51′04″W
- Mouth: Guzmán Basin
- Length: 91 mi (146 km)
- Basin size: 5,140 mi^{2} (13,300 km^{2})

The Mimbres is a 91-mile-long (146 km) river in southwestern New Mexico.

== Course ==
The Mimbres forms from snowpack and runoff on the southwestern slopes of the Aldo Leopold Wilderness in the Black Range at 33°06′58″N 107°51′04″W in Grant County. The river ends in the Guzmán Basin, a small endorheic basin east of Deming in Luna County. The uplands watershed are administered by the United States Forest Service, while the land in the Mimbres Valley is mostly privately owned. The upper reaches of the river are perennial. The river flows south from the Black Range, and the surface flow of the river dissipates in the desert north of Deming, but the river bed and storm drainage continue eastward, any permanent flow remaining underground. The Mimbres River Basin has an area of about 13,000 km^{2} (5,140 mi^{2}) and extends slightly into northern Chihuahua, Mexico.

== Conservation ==
A wide diversity of species (37 species; excluding arthropods other than crustaceans) are of great conservation concern. Eighteen species (49%) are classified as "vulnerable, imperiled, or critically imperiled" statewide as well as nationally. Additionally 13 species are classified as "vulnerable, imperiled, or critically imperiled" in the state although they are secure nationally. Birds, mammals, amphibians, and reptiles are also of concern within the riparian, ephemeral and terrestrial habitats.

The use of water from the Mimbres River is still a matter of contention.

== Human history ==
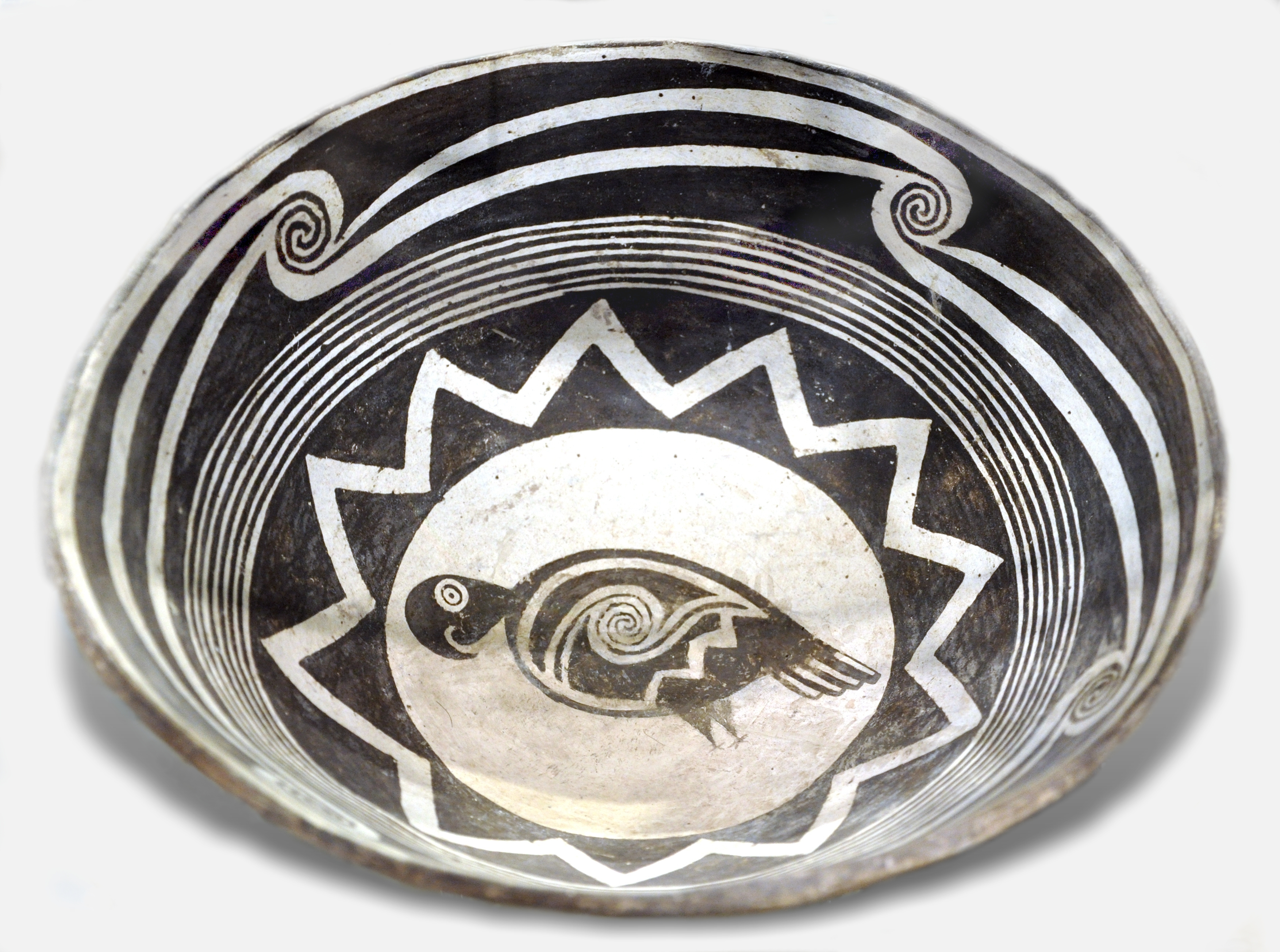
Mimbres pot depicting a macaw.

The Mimbres Basin supported the prehistoric Mimbres culture, which was part of the larger Mogollon culture. The culture developed from around 200 to 1000 CE, known as the pithouse period. During this time the use of pottery increased, and there was a greater dependence on agriculture throughout the Mogollon area. This agriculture increasingly depended upon irrigation from the perennial and storm flow of the Mimbres River. In the later part of the pithouse period, distinctive Mimbres pottery black-on-white designs grew more complex and ornate. Villages and irrigation complexes grew larger, and large kivas were built. These community ritual constructions were destroyed around 900 CE in huge ceremonial fires. This marked a major transition in social and ritual practices.

== See also ==
- List of rivers of New Mexico
- Oasisamerica cultures
- Swarts Ruin
- Battle of the Mimbres River
