= San Lorenzo, Grant County, New Mexico =

- Census-designated place
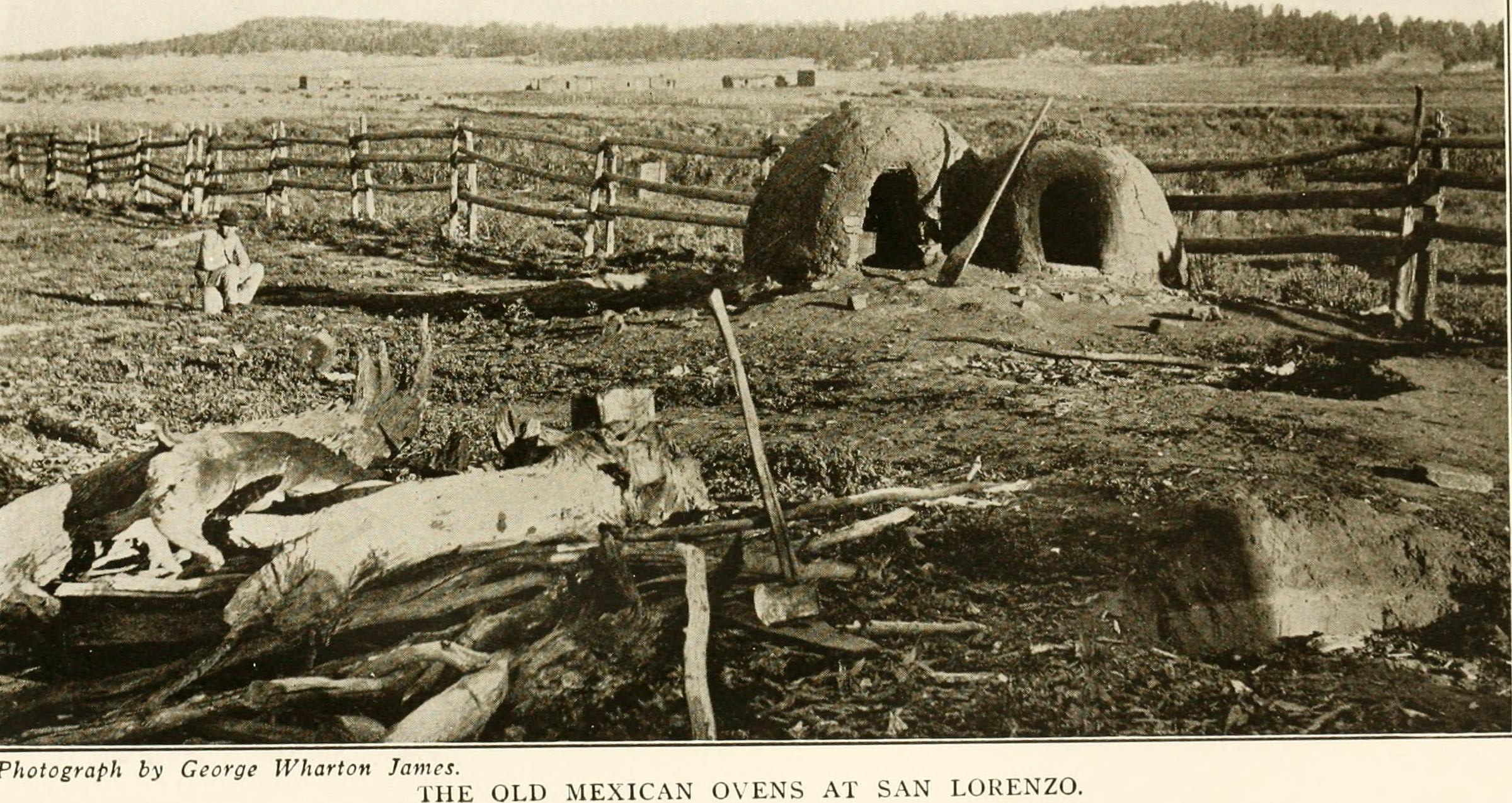

- Location within New Mexico Location within the United States
- Coordinates: 32°48′31″N 107°55′20″W
- Country: United States
- State: New Mexico
- County: Grant

Area
  - Total: 1.749 sq mi (4.53 km^{2})
  - Land: 1.747 sq mi (4.52 km^{2})
  - Water: 0.002 sq mi (0.0052 km^{2})
- Elevation: 5,702 ft (1,738 m)

Population (2010)
  - Total: 97
  - Density: 56/sq mi (21/km^{2})
- Time zone: UTC-7 (Mountain (MST))
  - Summer (DST): UTC-6 (MDT)
- Area code: 575
- GNIS feature ID: 2584207

San Lorenzo is a census-designated place in Grant County, New Mexico, United States. San Lorenzo is 13 miles (21 km) east-northeast of Bayard. Its population was 97 as of the 2010 census. A post office operated from 1886 to 1963.
