= Mimbres, New Mexico =

- Census-designated place
- Location within New Mexico Location within the United States
- Coordinates: 32°50′23″N 107°57′38″W
- Country: United States
- State: New Mexico
- County: Grant

Area
  - Total: 3.52 sq mi (9.11 km^{2})
  - Land: 3.49 sq mi (9.03 km^{2})
  - Water: 0.031 sq mi (0.08 km^{2})
- Elevation: 5,886 ft (1,794 m)

Population (2020)
  - Total: 390
  - Density: 111.9/sq mi (43.19/km^{2})
- Time zone: UTC-7 (Mountain (MST))
  - Summer (DST): UTC-6 (MDT)
- ZIP code: 88049
- Area code: 575
- GNIS feature ID: 2584155

Mimbres is a census-designated place in Grant County, New Mexico, United States. As of the 2020 census, Mimbres had a population of 390. Mimbres has a post office with ZIP code 88049. New Mexico State Road 35 passes through the community. The post office was established in 1886. It was named after the Mimbres River.

== Demographics ==
Historical population
Census	Pop.	Note	%±
2020	390		—
U.S. Decennial Census
