= New Mexico State Road 61 =

State highway in New Mexico, United States

State Road 61

Route information
- Maintained by NMDOT
- Length: 25.024 mi (40.272 km)

Major junctions
- South end: US 180 near Hurley
- North end: NM 152 near San Lorenzo

Location
- Country: United States
- State: New Mexico
- Counties: Grant, Luna

Highway system
- New Mexico State Highway System; Interstate; US; State; Scenic
← US 60	→ US 62

State Road 61 (NM 61) is a state highway in the US state of New Mexico. Its total length is approximately 25 miles (40 km). NM 61's southern terminus is at U.S. Route 180 (US 180), and the northern terminus is at NM 152.

== Major intersections ==
County	Location	mi	km	Destinations	Notes
Grant		0.000	0.000	US 180	Southern terminus
Luna	No major junctions				
Grant		25.024	40.272	NM 152 to NM 35 – Mimbres, Silver City, Hillsboro	Northern terminus; to NM 35 via NM 152 west
1.000 mi = 1.609 km; 1.000 km = 0.621 mi
