= Mimbres Valley AVA =

Wine growing region in southwestern New Mexico

Coordinates: 32°15′49″N 107°48′48″W

Mimbres Valley
- Wine region
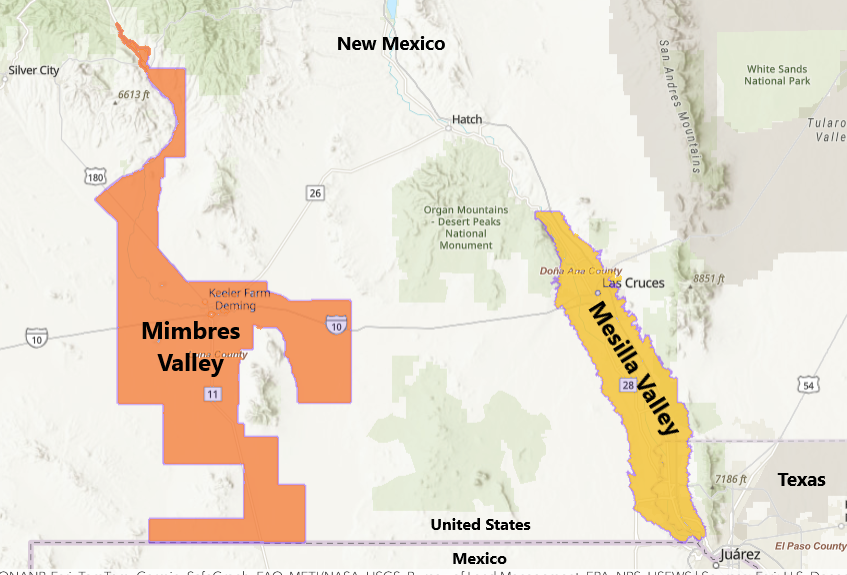
- Type: American Viticultural Area
- Year established: 1985
- Years of wine industry: 397
- Country: United States
- Part of: New Mexico
- Other regions in New Mexico: Mesilla Valley AVA, Middle Rio Grande Valley AVA
- Growing season: 180–207 days
- Climate region: Region IV-V
- Heat units: 3,826–5,049 GGD
- Precipitation (annual average): 9–10 in (230–250 mm) snow: 1–4 in (2.5–10.2 cm)
- Soil conditions: Sandy to loamy alluvium, and are generally fine, mixed and deep in character
- Total area: 636,800 acres (995 sq mi)
- Size of planted vineyards: 400 acres (160 ha)
- No. of vineyards: 12
- Grapes produced: Barbera, Cabernet Sauvignon, Chardonnay, Chenin Blanc, Dolcetto, French Colombard, Malvasia Bianca, Merlot, Muscat Canelli, Nebbiolo, Pinot Meunier, Pinot Noir, Ruby Cabernet, Syrah, Ugni Blanc and Zinfandel
- No. of wineries: 2

Mimbres Valley (/mˈɪmbəz/ MIM-bress) is an American Viticultural Area (AVA) located in Southwestern New Mexico between the towns of Silver City and Columbus encircling Deming. It was the nation's 80th and the state's second appellation established on November 21, 1985, by the Bureau of Alcohol, Tobacco and Firearms (ATF), Treasury after reviewing the petition submitted by Pam Ray, President of The Southwest Chapter of the New Mexico Vine and Wine Society, proposing a viticultural area along the Mimbres River Valley in Grant and Luna Counties named "Mimbres Valley." The viticultural area follows the Mimbres River southward from an area located approximately two miles (3 km) miles north of the town of Mimbres to approximately three miles (5 km) south of Columbus on the U.S.-Mexico border flanked by the Mogollon Mountains to the north and the Florida Mountains to the east. The AVA includes the Mimbres River watershed where most of the vineyards lie between 4,000 and 6,000 feet (1,200 and 1,800 m) above sea level. The area is a desert, but irrigation and the deep, rich soils of the once-larger Mimbres River have made viticulture possible since the late 19th century. The plant hardiness zone is 7 to 8.

== History ==
Mimbres Valley derives its name from the Mimbres Indians who inhabited the valley between 1100 and 1300 A.D. These primitive hunters and farmers made their houses of wood and adobe. Ruins of their houses are still found in the valley. The pottery they made is valued for the beauty of designs done in black and white. The bowls are decorated with drawings of men, animals and geometrics. After the Mimbres Indians disappeared, the Mimbreño Apache moved in from the Southern Great Plains. The Apache became famous under the leadership of the war chief, Mangus Coloradas. The area was also the scene of raids by other warrior leaders, Nana, Chato, Victorio, and Geronimo. During the period that the Apaches were inhabiting the area, the Spanish began their first exploration into New Mexico. De Vaca crossed this area as early as 1535. The famous explorer, Coronado, explored most of New Mexico in 1600. Just like the Indians, the Spanish left a strong cultural imprint upon the area. That is why many locations in the viticultural area have both Spanish and Indian names. The mountain peak north of Deming was first called "Picaho del Mimbres" until it was later renamed Cooks Peak by the Anglo-American settlers who came during the westward expansion. The valley in which Deming is located is named Mimbres (meem-breh), which means "willow," or osier tree.
Viticulture in the Mimbres Valley is documented in The History of Luna County, published in 1978 by the Luna County Historical Society. According to that publication, vineyards were found in Chinese gardens located east of Deming at the turn of the century. In 1913, the Holy Family Church was established in Deming. At that time grape vines, shade trees, shrubbery and fruit trees were planted on the church grounds. Emanuel Vocale who resided on land near Deming had 220 vines of tokay grapes that were planted by his father in 1932.

== Terroir ==
=== Topography ===
The area historically known as the Mimbres Valley begins at the headwaters of the Mimbres River between Reeds Peak and McKnight Mountain, in the Black Range, near the Continental Divide in Grant County. This northern part of the valley which is not included in the boundaries of the viticultural area is a narrow channel for the Mimbres River bordered by foothills and mountains.
The northern portion of the Mimbres Valley viticultural area is in Grant County near Bear Canyon Dam, where the valley begins to widen and show distinct evidence of a flood plain area. As the river enters Luna County, the valley widens into a broad, gently sloping flood plain. The course of the river winds around scattered foothill areas until it sinks from sight northeast of Deming, New Mexico, At one time, the primary river course was west of Deming and proceeded south through the pass separating the Florida Mountains and the Tres Hermanas Mountains. Over the years, the river sank at an area east of Columbus, New Mexico. Today, the Mimbres River is an intermittent stream and is usually dry except during periods of rainfall. The Mimbres River has no definite channel in the southern part of Luna County. At times, water from rainfall drainage has reached as far south as the Mexican border. The viticulture extends south to the U.S.-Mexican border. The Florida, Tres Hermanas Mountains and other non-agricultural land areas were excluded from the boundaries of the viticultural area because the soils, terrain and no available water rights make these mountain areas off limits to grape-growing or any other commercial potential. Elevations in these excluded areas that contain much rock out-croppings reach as high as 7,500 feet (2,300 m). Elevations within the viticultural area generally range from approximately 4,000 to 6,000 feet (1,200–1,800 m) above sea level.

=== Climate ===
Mimbres Valley viticultural area is characterized by an arid continental climate with minimal precipitation totals, low humidity, plentiful sunshine and large diurnal and seasonal temperature changes. Average annual precipitation totals are between 9 and 10 inches (230–250 mm), with half of the rainfall occurring by heavy thunderstorms from the months of July to September. Average annual snowfalls range from one to four inches (2.5–10.2 cm). These snowfalls usually melt soon after they occur. According to State Climatologist Kenneth E. Kunkel, there are three locations in the viticultural area where reasonably long weather records have been studied. They are at the towns of Deming, Columbus and Faywood. Outside of the viticultural area at Fort Bayard, Lordsburg and Las Cruces weather data has also been gathered for some time. Within the area, the elevations vary from about 4,000 feet (1,200 m) above sea level at the southern end to near 6,000 feet (1,800 m) at the northern end. These elevation differences are the major cause of some climatic differences within the Mimbres Valley viticultural area. Temperatures are found to be somewhat cooler at the northern end of the viticultural area than at the southern end. The means annual maximum temperature is about 4 degrees lower at Faywood than at Columbus. The growing season varies from 180 days at Faywood to 207 days at Columbus. The number of growing degree days varies from 3,826 at Faywood to 5,049 at Columbus.

=== Soils ===
The geographical features within the boundaries of this viticultural area are level to gently sloping alluvial soils. The soil associations within the boundaries of the viticultural.area are based upon U.S.D.A. Soil Conservation Service and Water Resources Research Institute information. Soils found within the boundaries of the viticultural area include Mimbres-Verhalen, Mohave Stellar, Hondale-Mimbres-Bluepoint, Mimbres and Mimbres-Verhalen associations. These soils were formed on flood plains and stream terraces. They range from sandy to loamy alluvium, and are generally fine, mixed and deep in character. These soils are usually level to gently sloping in terrain.

== Viticulture ==
There was two bonded winery located within the boundaries of the viticultural area. In 1984, St. Clair Vineyards was the sole winery located three miles (4.8 km) south of Deming with 600 acres (240 ha) of grapes. The grape varieties cultivated by St. Clair Vineyards include French Colombard, Sauvignon Blanc, Chardonnay, Malvasia Bianca, Muscat Canelli, Ugni Blanc, Zinfandel, Barbera, Cabernet Sauvignon, Merlot, Ruby Cabernet, Pinot Noir and Chenin Blanc. In 1984, vintner Gilbert Gruet and his family moved from Bethon, France to New Mexico to plant an experimental vineyard in Engle. The plantings were exclusively Chardonnay and Pinot Noir grapes and Gruet Winery was established becoming the largest winery in the AVA.

== See also ==
- New Mexico wine
