= National Register of Historic Places listings in Luna County, New Mexico =

Location of Luna County in New Mexico

Luna County, New Mexico, United States, has eight properties and districts listed on the National Register of Historic Places. All of the places within the county on the National Register are also listed on the State Register of Cultural Properties.

Latitude and longitude coordinates are provided for many National Register properties and districts; these locations may be seen together in a map.

This National Park Service list is complete through NPS recent listings posted June 26, 2026.

Contents: NRHP in New Mexico by county
Bernalillo – Catron – Chaves – Cibola – Colfax – Curry – De Baca – Doña Ana – Eddy – Grant – Guadalupe – Harding – Hidalgo – Lea – Lincoln – Los Alamos – Luna – McKinley – Mora – Otero – Quay – Rio Arriba – Roosevelt – San Juan – San Miguel – Sandoval – Santa Fe – Sierra – Socorro – Taos – Torrance – Union – Valencia

== Current listings ==
	Name on the Register	Image	Date listed	Location	City or town	Description
1	Deming Armory	Deming Armory	April 21, 1983 (#83001624)	301 S. Silver Ave. 32°15′59″N 107°45′21″W	Deming	Now the Deming Luna Mimbres Museum
2	Downtown Deming Historic District	Downtown Deming Historic District	September 25, 2013 (#13000769)	Roughly bounded by Silver Ave., Pine, Maple & Copper Sts. 32°16′02″N 107°45′31″W	Deming	
3	Seaman Field House	Seaman Field House	February 20, 1990 (#90000102)	304 Silver Ave. 32°16′00″N 107°45′27″W	Deming	
4	Luna County Courthouse and Park	Luna County Courthouse and Park	October 5, 1977 (#77000925)	700 S. Silver Ave. 32°17′21″N 107°45′24″W	Deming	
5	Mahoney Building	Mahoney Building	September 30, 1980 (#80002551)	122 S. Gold; 32°16′04″N 107°45′32″W	Deming	
6	Upton Site		December 9, 1980 (#80002552)	Address Restricted	Deming	
7	US Post Office-Deming Main	US Post Office-Deming Main	February 23, 1990 (#90000139)	201 W. Spruce St. 32°16′03″N 107°45′37″W	Deming	
8	Village of Columbus and Camp Furlong	Village of Columbus and Camp Furlong	May 15, 1975 (#75001164)	Portions of Columbus and Pancho Villa State Park; 31°49′39″N 107°37′50″W	Columbus	

== See also ==
- List of National Historic Landmarks in New Mexico
- National Register of Historic Places listings in New Mexico
