= Henry Street =

Henry or Harry Street may refer to:

== People ==
- Henry Street (cricketer) (1863–1953), English cricketer
- Harry Street (rugby league) (1927–2002), English professional rugby league footballer
- Henry Street (vintner) (died 2014), American vintner
- Harry Street (spree killer) (1944–2014), British spree killer
- Harry Street (jurist) (1919–1984), British jurist and legal scholar

== Places ==
- Henry Street High School, a school in Whitby, Ontario, Canada
- Henry Street Settlement, a charity home in Manhattan, New York
- Henry Street, Dublin, Ireland
- Henry Street, Fremantle, Western Australia
- Henry Street, Limerick, Ireland
- Henry Street (Manhattan), New York, United States
- Virginia State Route 132, Virginia, United States, known for most of its length as Henry Street
- Henry Street salamander tunnels in Amherst, Massachusetts, United States

== Other ==
- Henry St., a 2023 studio album by The Tallest Man on Earth
- Henry Street Gang, a criminal gang in Chicago, Illinois, United States
