= Ratafia =

Alcoholic beverages

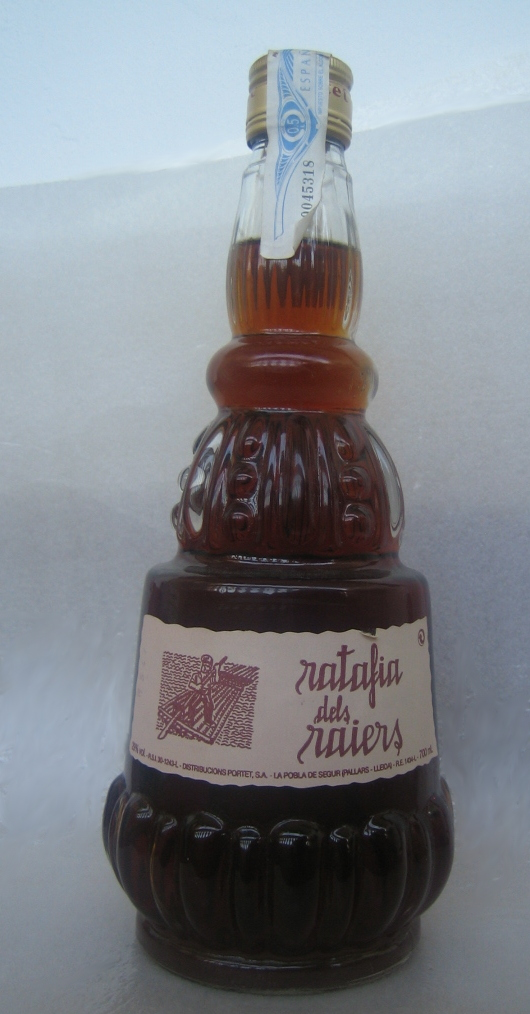
- Ratafia dels Raiers, from La Pobla de Segur
- Type: Sweet alcoholic beverage
- Origin: Mediterranean
- Flavour: Fruits or kernels, usually almond, green wild walnuts or the kernels of peach, apricot or cherry.

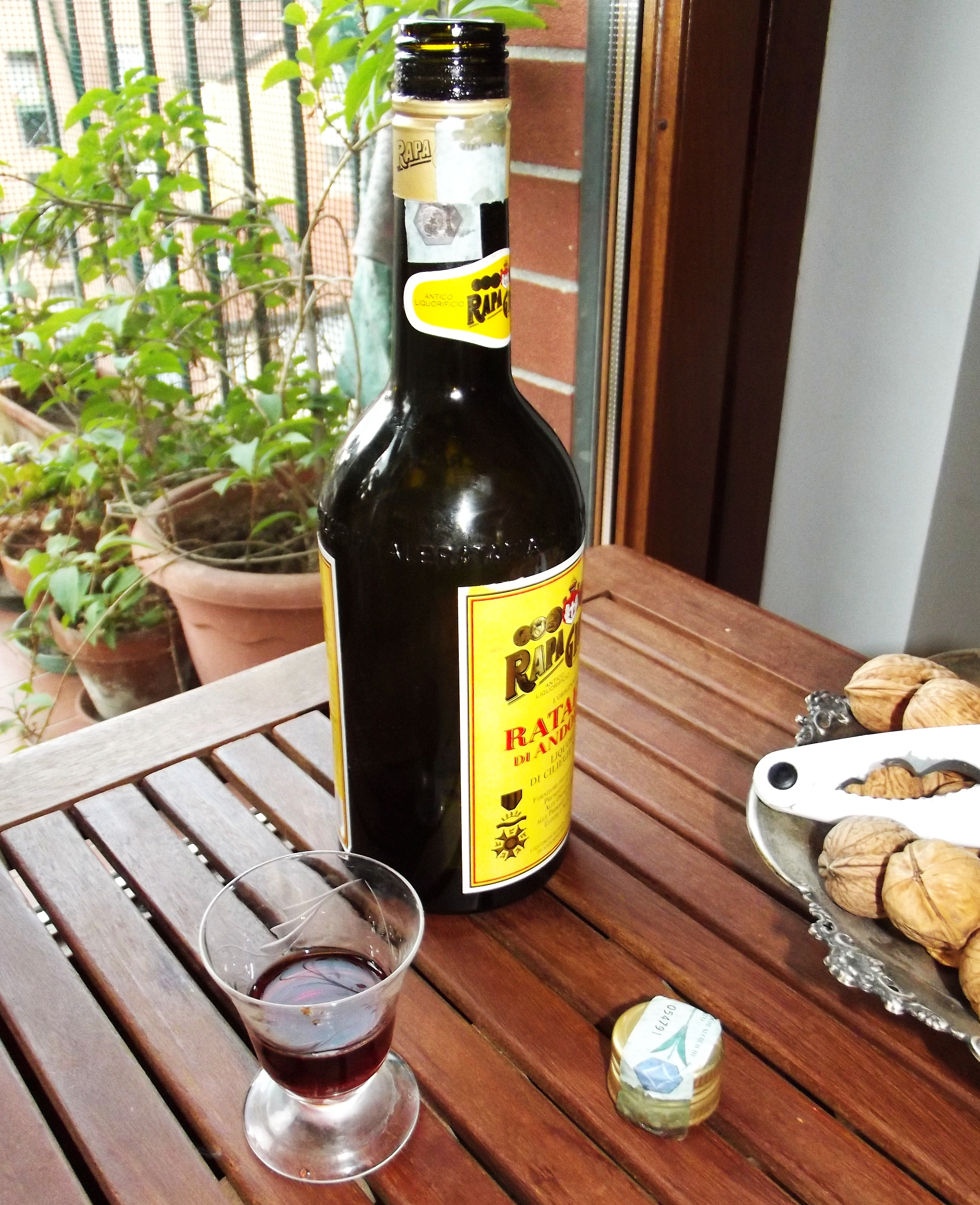
Ratafià of Andorno, Italy

Ratafia is a broad term used for two types of sweet alcoholic beverages, a flavouring essence whose taste resembles bitter almonds, later to a ratafia flavoured biscuit, a biscuit to be eaten along with ratafia, and later still, to a cherry variety.

The Oxford English Dictionary lists the word's earliest date of use as 1670.

== Liqueur ==
Ratafia liqueurs are alcoholic beverages compound liqueurs or cordials made by the maceration of ingredients such as aromatics, fruits, in pre-distilled spirits, followed by filtration and sweetening, the flavouring ingredients being merely infused in it. Ratafia may be flavoured with kernels (almond, green walnuts, peach, apricot, or cherry), lemon peel and spices in various amounts (nutmeg, cinnamon, clove, mint, rosemary, anise, etc.), typically combined with sugar. Other flavourings can be used, such as vegetables and fresh herbs.

The liqueur is typical of the Mediterranean areas of Spain, Italy, and north-east of France (Champagne and Burgundy). In the Pyrenees Ratafia is a sweet herbal liqueur made by infusing brandy or aqua-vita with a mix of lemon peel, cloves, nutmeg, green walnut peel, cinnamon, and sometimes mint and lemon verbena. Up to 50 different herbs can be used, adding complexity and regional uniqueness. Traditionally is prepared around the Summer Solstice (24th of June, St John's Day) when herbs are at their peak, though some prepare it for All Saint's Day (Nov 1), to be consumed starting Christmas accompanying a simple dessert composed of dried fruits, nuts and biscuits during sobremesa (a cherished Mediterranean time spent at the table after a meal, enjoying conversation, dessert, coffee, or a drink connecting with family or friends).

In Abruzzo, Italy, Ratafia is a traditional liqueur made with sour cherries (also known as amarena cherries) and Montepulciano d'Abruzzo wine.

Lazzaroni Amaretto, Luxardo Albicocca, Kahlua, Heering Original Cherry Liqueur, Alpenz Saint Elizabeth Allspice Dram, Carlshamms Flaggpunsch, Seale John D. Taylor's Velvet Falernum are ratafia liqueurs.

The liqueur form of ratafia is mentioned humorously in the lyrics of the song "The Unfortunate Miss Bailey", written by Lou Gottlieb and released by the Kingston Trio in 1959 on their album Here We Go Again!.

== Fortified wine ==
The second type, ratafia de Champagne, a fortified wine, is a type of mistelle, a mixture of marc (grappa) and the unfermented juice of the grape, and is the type produced in France.

D.H. Lescombes, in New Mexico, uses Moscato grapes fortified with brandy to stop the fermentation early, which keeps the residual sugar high.

== Biscuit ==
a small macaroon flavoured with almonds
− Collins English Dictionary

Ratafia biscuits are made with ratafia essence, sweet almonds, apricot kernels, rosewater, egg white, sugar. Originally made with sweet and bitter almonds, now apricot kernels. Amaretto is a ratafia liquor, thus the ratafia biscuits.

In 1727, The Compleat Housewife by Eliza Smith included a recipe for To make Ratafia Bisket, with the ingredients: bitter almonds, sugar and egg white, making it a confection that is very similar to a modern macaroon.

In 1789, The Complete Confectioner, by Frederick Nutt, a confectioner, formerly apprenticed with Domenico Negri, an Italian who opened the Pot and Pine Apple confectionery shop at 7-8 Berkeley Square, London, founded 1757, included a recipe, "No. 29. Ratafia Biscuits":

Take half a pound of sweet almonds, and half a pound of bitter almonds, and pound them in a mortar very fine, with whites of eggs; put three pounds of powdered sugar, mix it well with the whites of eggs, to the proper thickness into a bason; put two or three sheets of paper on the plate you bake on; take your knife, and the spaddle made of wood, and drop them on the paper, let them be round, and about the size of a large nutmeg; put them in the oven, which must be quick, let them have a fine brown, and all alike, but be careful they are not burnt at bottom, else they will not come off the paper when baked; let them be cold before you take them off.

== Other uses ==
Ratafia essence was suggested in a BBC recipe in their 1940 publication Food Facts For The Kitchen Front, for making mock marzipan, along with soya flour, margarine and sugar.
