= List of wineries in New Mexico =

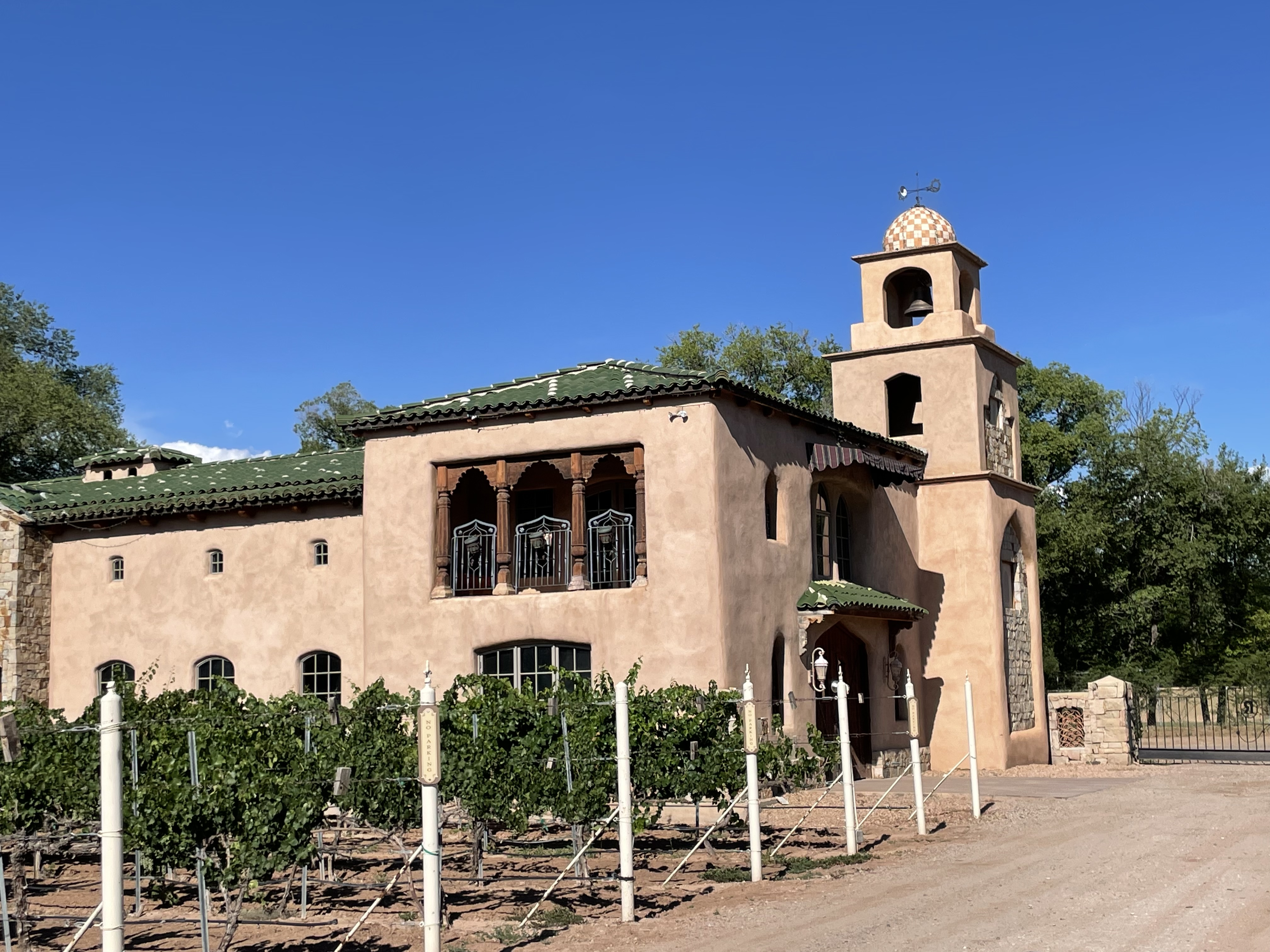
Casa Rondena Winery, Los Ranchos de Albuquerque, NM. July, 2022

This is a list of wineries in New Mexico. Within American wine, New Mexico has a long history of wine production, especially along the Rio Grande, from its capital Santa Fe, the city of Albuquerque with its surrounding metropolitan area, and in valleys like the Mesilla and the Mimbres River valleys. In 1629, Franciscan friar García de Zúñiga and a Capuchín friar named Antonio de Arteaga planted the first wine grapes in Santa Fe de Nuevo México, in what would become the modern Middle Rio Grande Valley AVA. Today, wineries exist in the aforementioned Middle Rio Grande Valley, as well as the Mesilla Valley AVA and the Mimbres Valley AVA.

== Central New Mexico ==
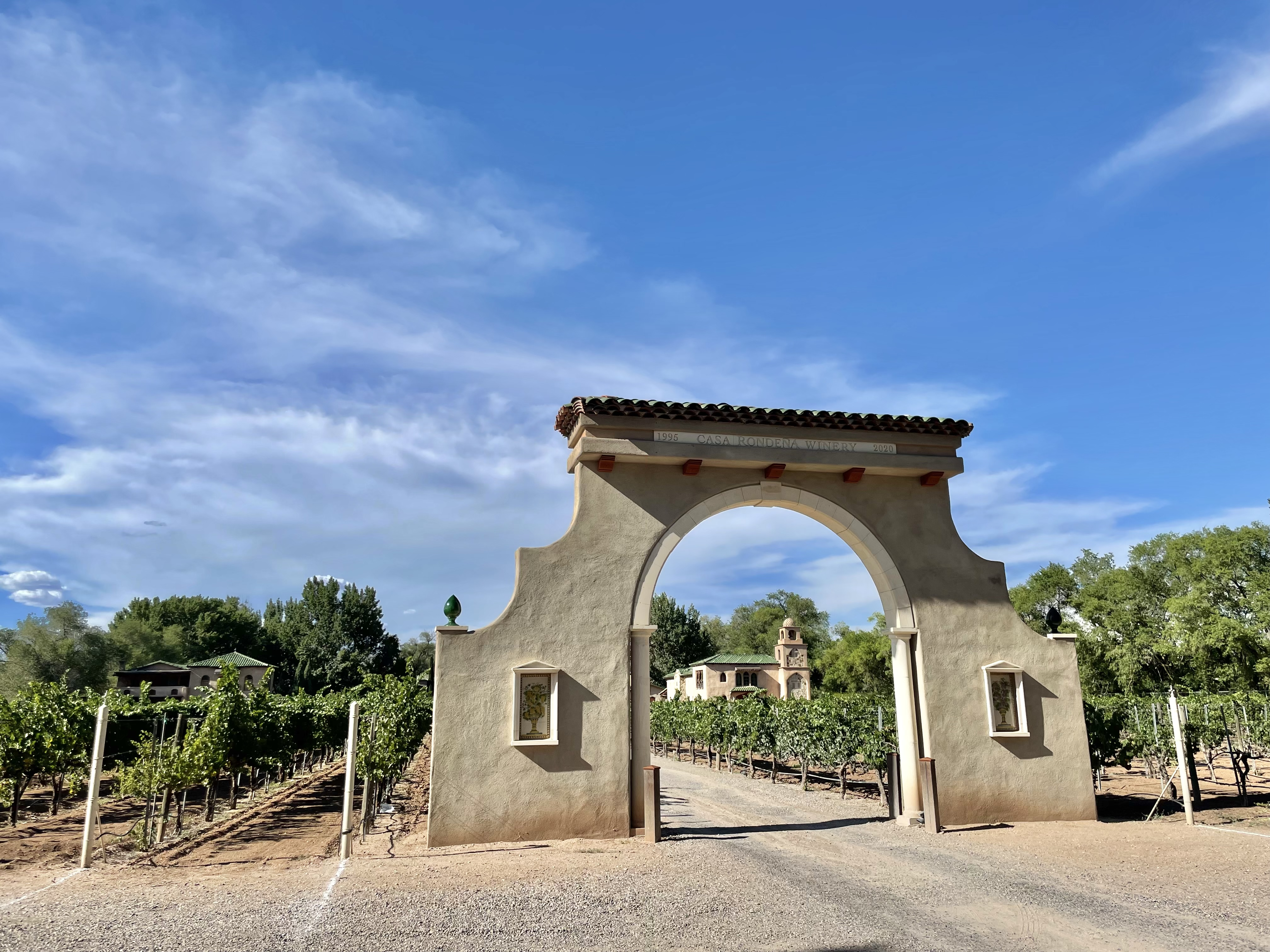
Casa Rondena Winery, Los Ranchos de Albuquerque, NM. July, 2022.

- Acequia Vineyards & Winery, Corrales
- Anasazi Fields, Placitas
- Anderson Valley Vineyards, Albuquerque
- Bees Brothers Winery, Albuquerque
- Black's Smuggler Winery, Bosque
- Casa Rondeña Winery, Los Ranchos de Albuquerque
- Corrales Winery, Corrales
- Gruet Winery, Albuquerque
- Guadalupe Vineyards, San Fidel
- Milagro Vineyards, Corrales
- Ponderosa Valley Vineyards & Winery, Ponderosa

== Northern New Mexico ==
- Black Mesa Winery, Velarde
- Embudo Valley Vineyards and Winery, Embudo
- La Chiripada Winery, Dixon
- Vivác Winery, Embudo
- Wines of the San Juan, Turley

== Southeastern New Mexico ==
- Balzano Winery, Carlsbad
- Dos Viejos Winery, Tularosa
- Noisy Water Winery, Ruidoso
- Pecos Flavors Winery, Roswell
- Tularosa Vineyards, Tularosa

== Southwestern New Mexico ==
- Amaro Winery, Las Cruces
- Black Range Winery and Vintage Wines, Mesilla
- La Viña Winery, La Union
- Luna Rossa Winery, Deming
- Rio Grande Vineyards & Winery, Las Cruces
- St. Clair Winery, Deming

== See also ==
- List of breweries in New Mexico
- List of vineyards and wineries
- New Mexico wine
