= Luna rossa =

Luna rossa means red moon in Italian and may refer to:

- Red Moon (1951 film)
- Red Moon (2001 film)
- Luna Rossa Ocean, fragrance by Prada
- Luna Rossa Prada Pirelli, America's Cup team and their boats
- Luna Rossa Winery, U.S. winery

== See also ==
- Red Moon (disambiguation)
