= Hunter's Moon =

A hunter's moon is the first full moon after the harvest moon.

Hunter's Moon may also refer to:

== Literature ==
- Hunter's Moon (Finch novel), based on the Doctor Who TV series
- Hunter's Moon (Kilworth novel), a 1989 novel by English fantasy author Garry Kilworth
- The Hunter's Moon (novel), a 1993 novel by O.R. Melling
- Hunter's Moon, a 1999 novel, the ninth in the Kate Shugak series

== Music ==
- Hunter's Moon (Delain EP), a 2019 EP by Dutch heavy metal band Delain
- Hunter's Moon (album), a 1992 album by noise rock band Of Cabbages and Kings
- "Hunter's Moon" (song), a song by Ghost from their 2022 album Impera
- Hunter's Moon (song), a song by Thin White Rope from their 1991 album The Ruby Sea

== Television ==
- "Hunter's Moon", a Gargoyles episode
- "Hunter's Moon" (Justice League Unlimited), a television episode
- "Hunter's Moon", a Lost in Space third-season episode

== Other ==
- The Hunter's Moon (film), a 1999 action drama directed by Richard C. Weinman and starring Burt Reynolds
- Hunter's Moon (video game), a 1987 shoot 'em up computer game for the Commodore 64

== See also ==
- Feast of the Hunter's Moon, a 2010 album by Black Prairie
- Feast of the Hunters' Moon, a yearly festival in Indiana, United States
- Blood moon
