= Dixon Studio Tour =

Studio tour in northern New Mexico, USA

The Dixon Studio Tour is the oldest continuously-running studio tour in northern New Mexico. It occurs annually in the fall in the Embudo Valley, and encompassing Dixon, Rinconada, Embudo, Apodaca and Cañoncito, and Cuestacitas.

During the tour, workshops in areas such as blacksmithing, hand-building in clay, raku, stone carving, painting and poetry are offered.

== History ==
During the Nixon administration (1969–1974), a number of artists moved to Dixon. Their works were represent by galleries and museums outside of Dixon.

The first Dixon Studio Tour was held in 1982. The tour was conceived by potter Nausika Richardson (1942-2011), who was inspired by "La Cienega de Santa Fe", the Santa Fe Studio Tour. The initial tour of 23 stops with 32 artists drew an unexpected 2,000 visitors.

In 2011, the tour celebrated its 30th anniversary, accompanied by the publication of a limited edition book of essays, designed by David Grey, putting the tour in historical context.

- Endo, Miya, ed. (2011). Dixon Studio Tour, 2011: 30 Years Creating Art and Community. Embudo Valley Arts Association. ISBN 978-0615537382.

There was a virtual tour in 2020, and in 2021 the tour returned as in-person event.
