= Noisy Water Winery =

Winery in New Mexico, United States

Coordinates: 33°19′53.4″N 105°40′10.3″W

Noisy Water Winery is an American winery in Ruidoso, New Mexico, founded in 2009 by the Riddle Family. In 2014, its wines won 15 awards at the Finger Lakes International Wine Competition, including a Double Gold for its Ruidoso Bubbly Moscato, 2 Gold medals, and 5 Silver medals. According to co-owner Jasper Riddle, it is the only winery in Ruidoso that authentically produces its own wines.

Noisy Water has five tasting rooms throughout New Mexico, with two in Ruidoso, Cloudcroft, Santa Fe, & Red River. Noisy Water Winery Ruidoso in Midtown features their best selling lines, like Jo Mamma's Mango Tango, Tighty Whitey White and Besito Caliente Green Chile wine. Just three doors down from Noisy Water Winery Ruidoso is The Cellar Uncorked, which features Limited Reserve wines and Vintner Private Selects. Circa 2013, Noisy Water Winery opened new tasting rooms in Cloudcroft, New Mexico - Noisy Water Winery Cloudcroft and in Santa Fe, New Mexico - Noisy Water Winery Santa Fe. In 2019, Noisy Water Winery expanded again, going further North to Red River, New Mexico and opening Noisy Water Winery Red River.

== Selected awards ==
2013 New Mexico State Fair

- 2010 Shiraz, Gold

2014 Finger Lakes International Wine Competition

- Ruidoso Bubbly (Moscato), Double Gold
- Malvasia Bianca, Gold
- Tighty Whitey (Pinot Gris), Gold
- 2010 Cabernet Sauvignon, Silver

== See also ==
- List of wineries in New Mexico
- New Mexico wine
