= Rio Grande Valley (disambiguation) =

Rio Grande Valley may refer to:

- Lower Rio Grande Valley, a region of South Texas
- Rio Grande Valley (New Mexico), the river valley from Cochiti Pueblo, New Mexico to El Paso, Texas

Rio Grande Valley may also refer to:

- The drainage basin of the Rio Grande
- Rio Grande Valley State Park
- Rio Grande rift
- Rio Grande Gorge
- Middle Rio Grande Valley AVA
- Mesilla Valley
