= Levi Romero =

Levi Romero may refer to:

- Levi Romero (baseball) (born 1984), Venezuelan former MLB pitcher
- Levi Romero (poet) (born 1961), American poet, academic, architect, and lecturer in creative writing and Chicano studies
