= Downtown Deming Historic District =

Historic district in New Mexico, United States

- U.S. National Register of Historic Places
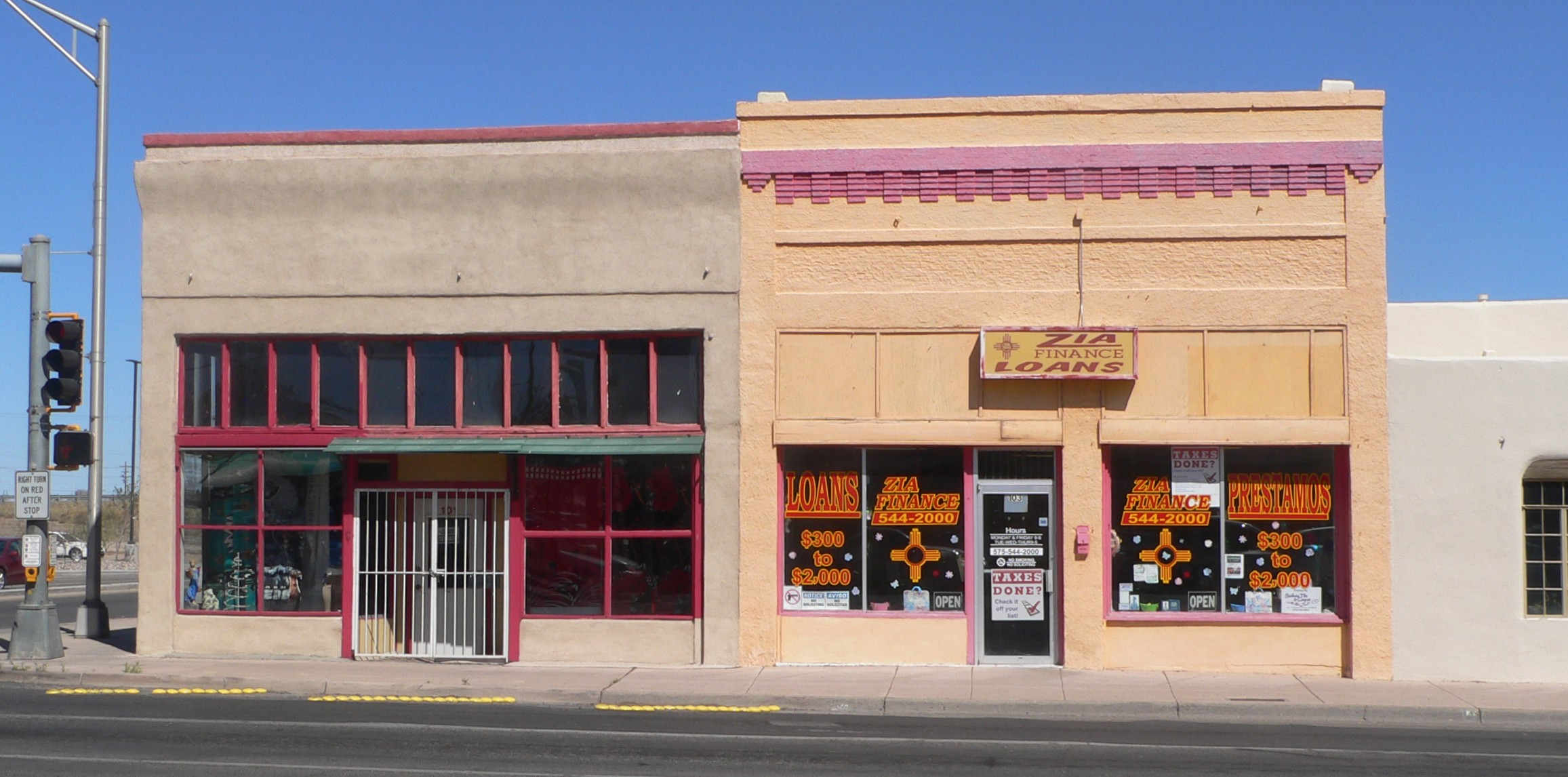

- Location within New Mexico
- Location: Roughly bounded by Silver Ave., Pine, Maple & Copper Sts., Deming, New Mexico
- Coordinates: 32°16′02″N 107°45′31″W
- Area: 30 acres (12 ha)
- Built: 1881
- Architect: Trost & Trost
- Architectural style: Late Victorian, Late 19th And 20th Century Revivals, Mixed
- NRHP reference No.: 13000769
- Added to NRHP: September 25, 2013

The Downtown Deming Historic District, in Deming, New Mexico, is a 30 acres (12 ha) historic district which was listed on the National Register of Historic Places in 2013. It is roughly bounded by Silver Ave., Pine, Maple & Copper Streets.

It includes 63 contributing buildings and two contributing structures.

It includes:

- J.A. Mahoney Building (1912), 122 South Gold Avenue, designed by architects Trost & Trost, separately listed on the National Register in 1980
- Deming Armory (1916), now the Deming·Luna Mimbres Museum, 301 South Silver Avenue, designed by Trost & Trost
