= Black Mesa Winery =

American winery in New Mexico

Coordinates: 36°10′42.3″N 105°58′18.0″W

Black Mesa Winery is an American winery in Velarde, New Mexico, founded in 1992. In 2014, Three of Black Mesa's vintages won high awards at the 15th Jefferson Cup Invitational Wine Competition. The winery is known for its chocolate-infused red wine, Black Beauty.

Black Mesa produces over twenty-five varieties of New Mexican wine. The winery has a tasting room at 1502 Highway 68 in Velarde, near Mile Marker 15.

== History ==
Velarde was originally known as La Joya, meaning "jewel" in Spanish, so called because it was considered some of the best farmland in Santa Fe de Nuevo México.

Black Mesa was founded in 1992 by Dr. Gerhard and Connie Anderson. It was purchased by the current owners, Jerry and Lynda Burd, in 2000.

Lynda Burd is an artist and designs all of the wine labels, her works are displayed in the tasting room. She hosts an art class for patrons, "Art by the Glass."

== Awards ==
15th Jefferson Cup Invitational Wine Competition (2014)

- 2011 Cosecha Ultima, Jefferson Cup.
- 2011 Coyote, Jefferson Cup Award of Merit.
- 2011 New Mexico Cabernet Sauvignon, Jefferson Cup.
- 2012 Burd Vineyard Montepulciano, top 95 category.

== See also ==
- List of wineries in New Mexico
- New Mexico wine
