= Village of Columbus and Camp Furlong =

- U.S. National Register of Historic Places
- U.S. National Historic Landmark District
- NM State Register of Cultural Properties
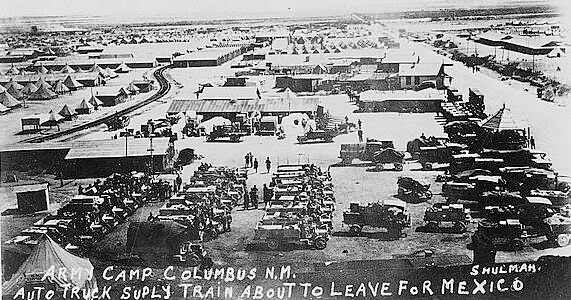
- Camp Furlong, circa 1916

- Location within New Mexico Location within the United States
- Location: Portions of Columbus and Pancho Villa State Park, Columbus, New Mexico
- Coordinates: 31°49′39″N 107°37′50″W
- Area: 138 acres (56 ha)
- Built: 1917
- Website: Official website
- NRHP reference No.: 75001164
- NMSRCP No.: 390

Significant dates
- Added to NRHP: May 15, 1975
- Designated NHLD: May 15, 1975
- Designated NMSRCP: June 20, 1975

The Village of Columbus and Camp Furlong is a National Historic Landmark District commemorating the 1916 raid by Pancho Villa on the town of Columbus, New Mexico, and the American military response to that raid, the "Punitive Expedition" led by General John J. Pershing. The raid and its response, set during World War I, the Mexican Revolution, and an accompanying low-level Border War, played a significant role in diplomacy and military preparedness for eventual American entry in the World War. The district encompasses buildings that survived the raid, and military facilities used in the American response. The landmark designation was made in 1975.

== History ==
On March 9, 1916, Camp Furlong was the headquarters of the 13th U.S. Cavalry under command of Colonel H. J. Slocum. The 13th Cavalry was stretched along the border on outpost duty from Noria to Hermanas on the El Paso and Southwestern Railroad. At least three troops were present during the raid on Columbus by Pancho Villa's irregulars. The hero of the day was Lt. Lucas of the machine gun troop, who while barefoot, set up machine guns in the main area of the town and directed heavy fire against the raiders. His actions inflicted numerous casualties on Villa's forces and caused them to retreat back into Mexico.

Almost overnight, the camp became a large military installation for protection from other raids and in preparation for a punitive expedition into Mexico to be led by General John J. Pershing. First on the scene were elements of the New Mexico National Guard. Various regular units then arrived to provide support to the troops in Mexico. Columbus had the distinction of having the first tactical military airfield in the United States. The 1st Aero Squadron's Curtiss JN3 Jenny biplanes provided aerial observation and communications for the expedition, although most of the aircraft were lost to crashes in the rugged Mexican mountains. Camp Furlong also had supply facilities and repair yards for the early motor trucks used in Mexico. At its peak, the camp was headquarters for more than 5,000 troops.

Following the withdrawal of the Punitive Expedition, the 24th Infantry Regiment was headquartered at the post. They were called in the summer of 1919 to assist in chasing Pancho Villa's troops out of Ciudad Juarez. With the conclusion of the Mexican Revolution, the post lost its importance and only 100 men were garrisoned there in 1921. All troops in the area were gone by 1923.

== Historic district ==
In Pancho Villa State Park, several buildings remain from the time of Villa's 1916 raid, and are listed on the National Register of Historic Places. These include the 1902 U.S. Customs House, two adobe structures dating from the Camp Furlong era, and the Camp Furlong Recreation Hall. A separate, purpose-built structure serves as the State Park visitor center, with exhibits describing the histories of Pancho Villa, the Columbus raid of 1916, and Pershing's Punitive Expedition.

The historic district also includes the former airfield, which is east of the state park, the former railroad station of the El Paso and Southwestern Railroad (which now houses the local historical society museum), and the former Hoover Hotel, an adobe structure that was one of the only other buildings to survive, and which now houses a desert art gallery.

== See also ==
- National Register of Historic Places listings in Luna County, New Mexico
- List of National Historic Landmarks in New Mexico
