= Ponderosa Valley Vineyards & Winery =

American winery

Coordinates: 35°38′29.4″N 106°40′47.2″W

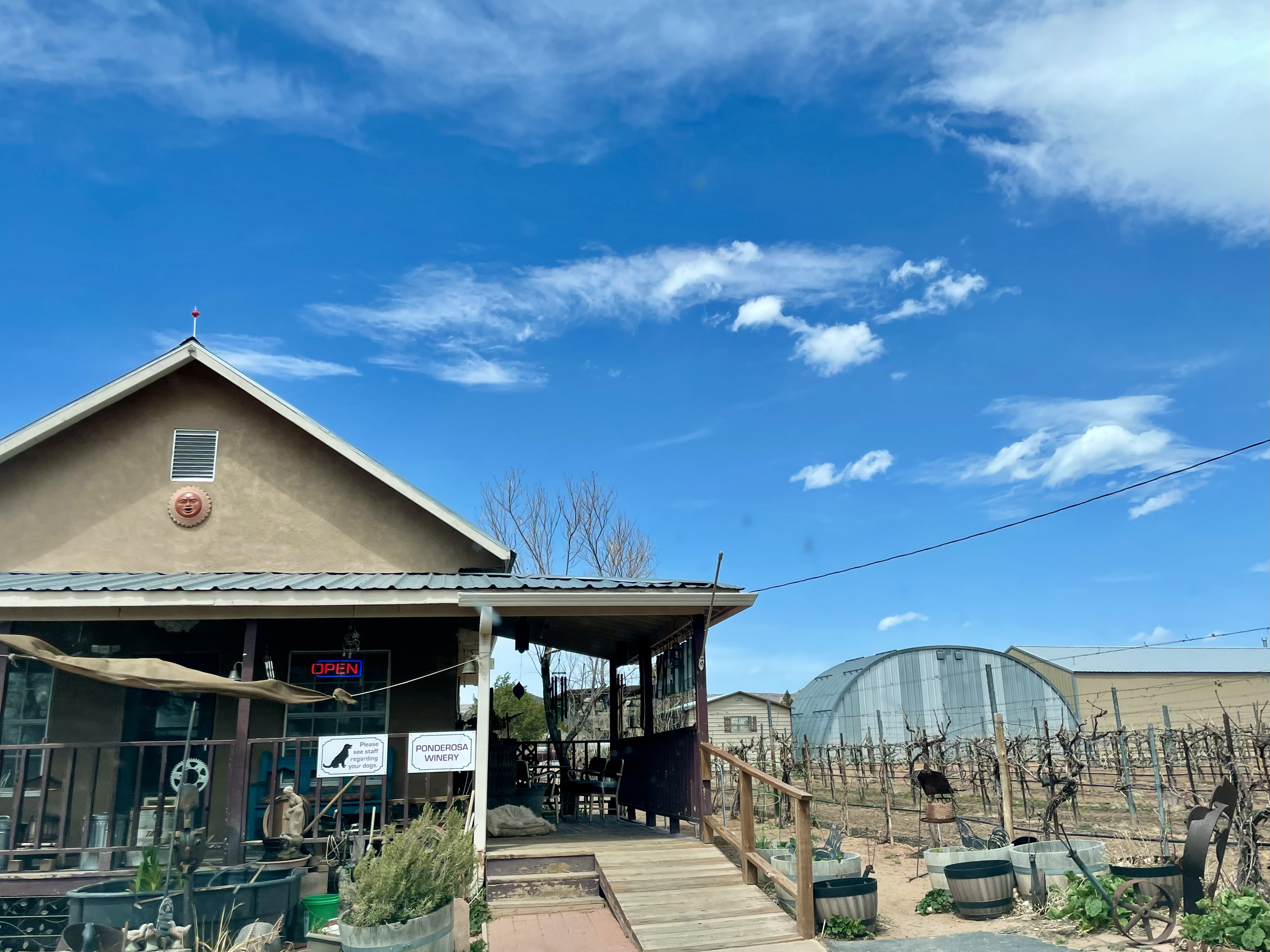
Ponderosa Valley Vineyards & Winery, Ponderosa, New Mexico

Ponderosa Valley Vineyards & Winery is an American winery located in Ponderosa, New Mexico, founded in 1982. Its wines have won awards in the Indy International Competition and the Colorado State Fair and New Mexico State Fair wine competitions. Since 1996, the winery has only released vintages which have won multiple bronze, silver and gold medals in formal wine competition.

== History ==
Henry Street first came to the Ponderosa Valley in 1976. He planted his first vineyards on the southern slopes of the Jemez Mountains in 1978. The winery began serving wine in 1993.

Street authored the book The History of Wine in New Mexico: 400 Years of Struggle.

Street died on July 9, 2014.

== Selected awards ==
- 2006 Reserve Red, Gold Medal, New Mexico State Fair
- 2006 Sangiovese, Gold Medal, "Best of Show," New Mexico State Fair
- 2008 Late Harvest Muscat, Gold Medal, "Best of Show," New Mexico State Fair
- 2012 NM Riesling, Gold Medal, "Best of Show," New Mexico State Fair

== See also ==
- List of wineries in New Mexico
- New Mexico wine
