= La Chiripada Winery =

American winery

Coordinates: 36°11′47.7″N 105°52′51.0″W

La Chiripada Winery is an American winery in Dixon, New Mexico, founded in 1981 by Michael and Patrick Johnson. It has regularly won awards for its wines at the Southwest Wine Competition and the New Mexico State Fair Wine Competition. It is the highest commercial winery in the United States, at an elevation of 6,100 feet (1,900 m). La Chiripada is a feature of the annual Dixon Studio Tour, which is held in late fall and is the oldest continuously running annual studio tour in Northern New Mexico.

La Chiripada has a tasting room in the Taos Downtown Historic District on Bent Street, the La Chiripada Wine Shop.

== History ==
La Chiripada was founded by the Johnson family, who built the adobe winery by hand in 1981. It is located south of Taos, New Mexico in the Rio Embudo Valley.

The vineyards produce an annual crop of twenty to thirty tons of grapes. La Chiripada produces a variety of whites, reds, and specialty wines.

== See also ==
- List of wineries in New Mexico
- New Mexico wine
