= Mesilla Valley AVA =

American Viticultural Area located in New Mexico and Texas

Coordinates: 32°14′15″N 106°45′30″W

Mesilla Valley
- Wine region
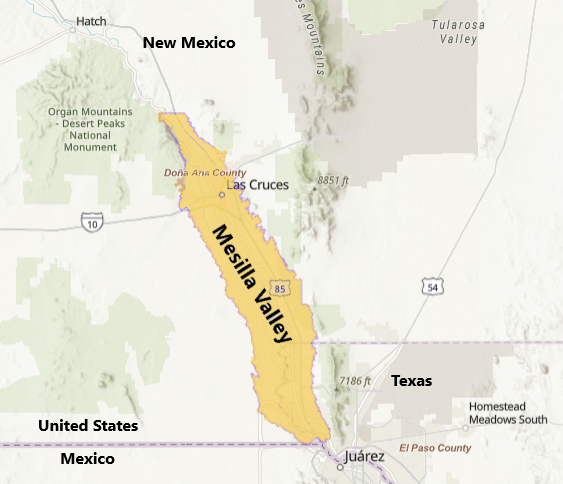
- Type: American Viticultural Area
- Year established: 1985
- Country: United States
- Part of: New Mexico, Texas
- Growing season: 231 days
- Climate region: Region V
- Heat units: 4000 GDD
- Precipitation (annual average): 8 in (200 mm) snow: less than 3 in (76 mm)
- Soil conditions: Rich alluvium on layers of clay loam and fine sandy loam
- Total area: 285,000 acres (445 sq mi)
- Size of planted vineyards: 40 acres (16 ha)
- No. of vineyards: 21
- Grapes produced: Albariño, Barbera, Black Muscat, Cabernet Sauvignon, Chardonnay, Chenin Blanc, Dolcetto, Gewurztraminer, Malvasia, Merlot, Montepulciano, Tempranillo, Moscato, Mourvedre, Muscat of Alexandria, Pinot Grigio, Pinot Noir, Primitivo, Riesling, Sangiovese, Shiraz, Syrah, Tempranillo, Viognier, Zinfandel
- No. of wineries: 3
- Wine produced: Madre D'eira

Mesilla Valley is an American Viticultural Area (AVA) located in the Mesilla Valley landform that extends along the Rio Grande River encompassing an area from the vicinity north of Las Cruces, New Mexico within Dona Ana County across the state border to El Paso County, Texas and the vicinity of El Paso on a 50-mile (80 km) north–south axis toward the Mexican border,. It was established as the nation's 76^{th}, and the initial appellation in New Mexico and Texas, on February 14, 1985 by the Bureau of Alcohol, Tobacco and Firearms (ATF), Treasury after reviewing the petition submitted by Mr. George Newman, President of the Las Cruces Chapter of the New Mexico Wine and Vine Society, proposing a viticultural area located in New Mexico and Texas named "Mesilla Valley."
Cabernet Sauvignon, Zinfandel and Syrah are the most important grape varieties planted there. The climate in the Mesilla Valley is dry and hot.

== History ==
The Mesilla Valley derived its name from the Spanish explorer Don Juan de Oñate who led expeditions to the area in 1598, and named a local indigenous village Trenquel de la Mesilla, from which the valley became known as Mesilla Valley. "Mesilla" (Spanish pronunciation: [/meˈsiʎa/] muh-SEE-yah), means "little table" or "nightstand" describing the plateau landform on which the village was situated. Although viticulture began in nearby El Paso as early as 1650, grapes were first planted in the Mesilla Valley only in the early nineteenth century, near the town of Doña Ana. According to evidence provided by the petitioner and acknowledged by ATF, grapes have been planted in the Mesilla Valley for over 100 years. The first vineyards were planted in Doña Ana, the oldest settlement in the valley. The first grapes grown were of the Mission variety from Mexico. The area known as Mesilla Valley was depicted on a nineteenth century map, based on the explorations of 1849–1852, by Captain R.B. Marcy of the 5th U.S. Infantry, under orders from the U.S. War Department. A photocopy of that map was submitted by the petitioner.
The area of the Mesilla Valley is also depicted on United States Geological Survey maps. According to a magazine article submitted by the petitioner, that appeared in "New Mexico Magazine" in March 1982, the fertile Mesilla Valley was once dotted with wineries, typically small and family run.

== Terroir ==
=== Topography ===
Elevations within the viticultural area range from approximately 3,700 feet to 4,200 feet above sea level, and in the mountains outside of the viticultural area elevations reach up to 8,700 feet (2,700 m) above sea level. To the east of the Mesilla Valley viticultural area is the Fort Bliss Military Reservation. Also to the east are the Organ, Doña Ana and Franklin Mountains. To the west lie the Portillo, Robledo and Sierra de las Uvas Mountains and the Aden and Sleeping Lady Hills. Much of the eastern and western boundaries are found along the 4,150 and 4,200 feet (1,260 and 1,280 m) elevation contour lines. The petitioner claimed and ATF agrees that these contour lines appropriately mark the transition from valley-foothills to dry land mesas where water availability is poor and soil types differ notably. The northern border of the valley ends at Tonuco Mountain where the river valley narrows. To the south lies the New Mexico, U.S.A.-Mexico (Chihuahua) international border. The area to the south in Mexico consists of mountains and arid plains. While most of the irrigated land in the viticultural area is found at less than 4,000 feet (1,200 m) above sea level in elevation, some areas within it reach 4,200 feet (1,300 m) above sea level. The higher mesa areas and mountainous elevations of the Mesilla Valley above 4,200 feet (1,300 m) have been excluded from being within the boundaries of the viticultural area since very few grapes are grown in these locations. The irrigation water available from the Rio Grande River watershed surrounds most of the prime farmland that makes up the viticultural area. At the higher elevations of the viticultural area, water must be pumped from wells to irrigate the land.

=== Soils ===
The soils found within the Mesilla Valley differ from those found in the surrounding mountain, foothill and dry mesa land areas outside of the viticultural area. The soil associations within the viticultural area are predominantly derived from the Glendale-Harkey series. Soils from the Glendale-Harkey series are stratified, deep, well drained, nearly level soils that are formed in alluvium. The surface layer is loam or clay loam and the layers below are clay loam and very fine sandy loam. These soils are formed on floodplains and stream terraces. Soils to the east and west of the viticultural area tend to be more steeply sloped and contain more sand and stone. At the higher mountainous elevations located outside of the viticultural area the soil is formed in residium from sandstone. It contains rock outcroppings and is generally shallower. It tends to be hilly to extremely steep and contains igneous rock land and limestone rock land associations.

=== Climate ===
The Mesilla Valley has an arid continental climate with over 4,000 degree-days annually. The mean annual temperature is 60.8 °F (16.0 °C) although daily temperatures fluctuate about 33 °F (1 °C). Winter minimum temperatures of 32 °F (0 °C) are common, but winter temperature below 2 °F (−17 °C) occur only one year in ten during January. The growing season is approximately 200 days long and occurs from approximately April 12 to October 27. On the average, the temperature will fall 3 °F (−16 °C) for every increase of 1,000 feet (300 m) in elevation above the floor of the valley. This makes the higher elevations in the valley somewhat cooler. Fall, winter, and spring are the dry seasons of the year. During these seasons, moisture in the air coming from the Pacific Ocean is removed as it passes over the mountains west of New Mexico. During the summer months, moisture-laden air coming from the Gulf of Mexico enters southern New Mexico. Strong surface heating and the up slope flow of air cause brief and somewhat heavy afternoon and evening thunder showers. The Organ Mountains to the east of the Mesilla Valley protect the valley from the heavier showers. Precipitation in the valley usually amounts to only about eight inches (200 mm) annually. At higher elevations in the valley, rainfall may be heavier. The relative humidity in the valley is generally low. Winter is generally mild and sunny. The average snowfall in the Mesilla Valley viticultural area is less than three inches (76 mm) annually and seldom lasts more than two consecutive days. At elevations higher than 4,500 feet (1,400 m) snowfall is more common and is more apt to remain on the ground for longer periods of time. The plant hardiness zones are 8a and 8b.

== Viticulture ==
The grape growing revival in the Mesilla Valley was first observed in the 1960s and has progressed in recent years. The largest vineyard in New Mexico, New Mexico Vineyards, belongs to Luna Rosa Winery in Deming, New Mexico. More than 50 different grape varieties have been grown in the valley over the years. Some of the grape varieties grown within the boundaries of the viticultural area include Colombard, Riesling, Cabernet Sauvignon, Ruby Cabernet, Zinfandel, Chenin Blanc and Barbera.

== See also ==
General

- New Mexico wine
- Texas wine

Wineries

- La Viña Winery
- St. Clair Winery
