= Mahoney Building =

- U.S. National Register of Historic Places
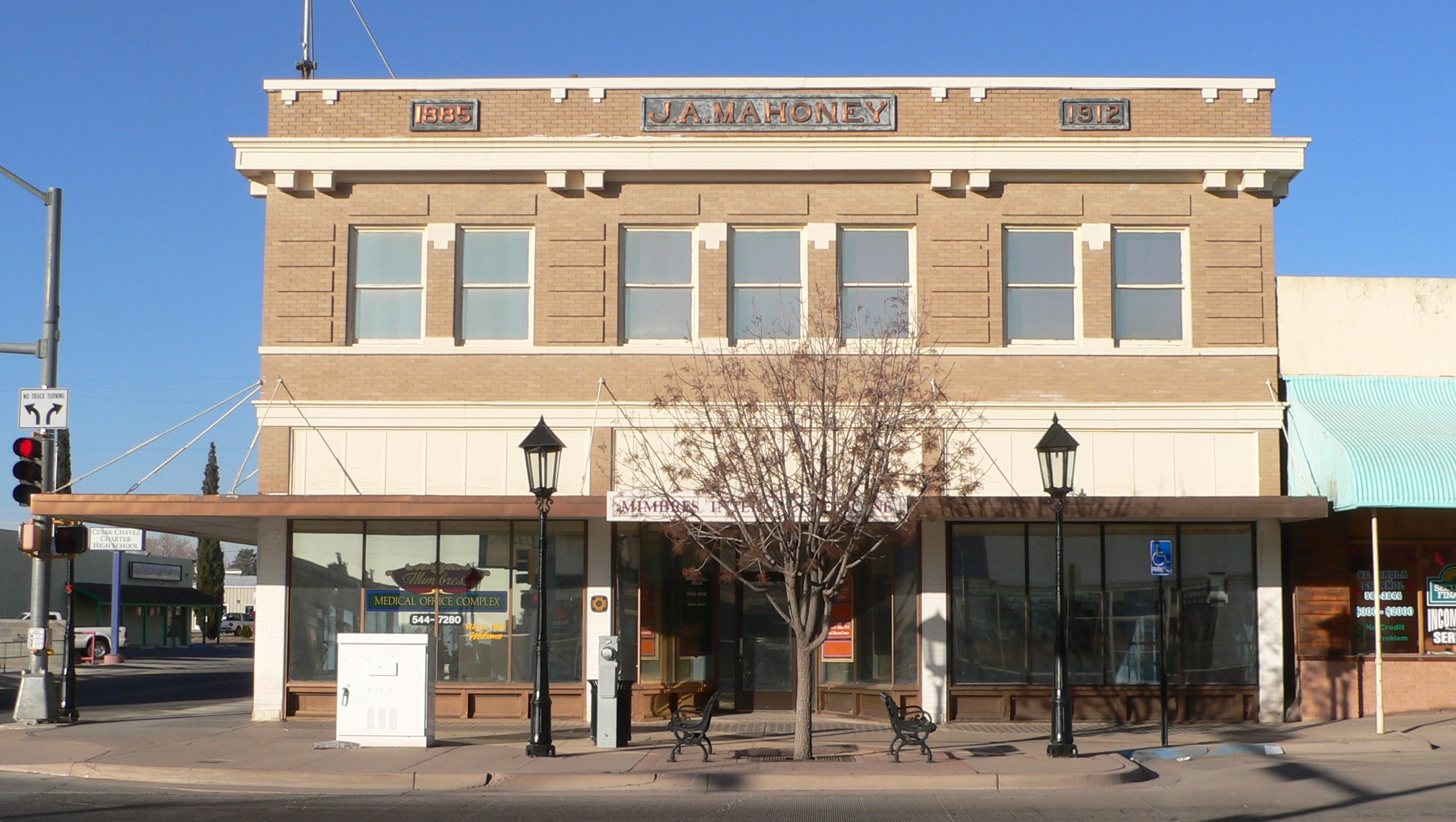

- Location within New Mexico
- Location: Gold and Spruce Sts., Deming, New Mexico
- Coordinates: 32°16′04″N 107°45′32″W
- Area: less than one acre
- Built: 1912
- Built by: Mahoney, Joseph P.
- Architect: Trost & Trost
- NRHP reference No.: 80002551
- Added to NRHP: September 30, 1980

The J.A. Mahoney Building, or Mahoney Building, at Gold and Spruce Sts. in Deming, New Mexico, was built in 1912. It was listed on the National Register of Historic Places in 1980.

It is also a contributing building in the Downtown Deming Historic District.

It was designed by El Paso architects Trost & Trost. It was built by Joseph Mahoney "a leading merchant and landowner of Deming and Luna County, to house his hardware and home furnishings store (basement and ground level) and to provide ample and, for the time, luxurious private office space on the second floor (sixteen offices, plus a large reception area, two residential suites and a wide corridor)."

It is now doctors offices and other businesses.
