= Cañoncito, Rio Arriba County, New Mexico =

Cañoncito, New Mexico
- Unincorporated community
- Location within New Mexico
- Coordinates: 36°10′51″N 105°49′56″W
- Country: United States
- State: New Mexico
- County: Rio Arriba
- Elevation: 6,224 ft (1,897 m)
- Time zone: UTC-7 (Mountain (MST))
  - Summer (DST): UTC-6 (MDT)
- Area code: 505
- GNIS feature ID: 904701

Cañoncito is an unincorporated community in Rio Arriba County, New Mexico, United States. Cañoncito is located on Embudo Creek, 3.4 miles (5.5 km) east-southeast of Dixon.
