= Red Moon =

Red moon may refer to:

- Red moon, the color of the Moon in a complete lunar eclipse
- Red moon, another name for a full moon

Red Moon may also refer to:

== Film and TV ==
- Red Moon (1951 film) (Italian Luna rossa), a 1951 film
- Red Moon (2001 film) (Italian Luna rossa), a 2001 film
- The Red Moon (film), a 2014 Moroccan film
- The pilot episode of the 2019 TV series For All Mankind

== Music ==
- Red Moon (The Call album), 1990
- Red Moon (Kalafina album), 2010
- Red Moon (Mamamoo EP), 2018
- Red Moon (Kard EP), 2020
- "Red Moon" (song), by Lil Uzi Vert, 2023
- The Red Moon EP, by Turin Brakes, 2005
- "Red Moon", song by Will Wood and the Tapeworms, 2015
- "Red Moon", song by Kim Woo-seok, 2020
- Red Moon, a.k.a. Debrah Scarlett (born 1993), Norwegian-Swiss singer-songwriter
- The Red Moon (Johnson and Cole), a 1908 theatrical show

== Other uses ==
- Red Moon (game), a game in the 1988 Time and Magik text adventure games
- Red Moon, a science fiction BBC radio drama winner of the 2019 BBC Audio Drama Award for Best Podcast or Online Only Audio Drama
- Red Moon (novel), a 2018 science fiction novel

== See also ==
- Luna rossa (disambiguation), red moon in Italian
- "Red Moon of Zembabwei", a Conan the Barbarian story by L. Sprague de Camp and Lin Carter in the July 1974 Fantastic
- Blood Moon (disambiguation), reference to the blood-red color at eclipse, among other meanings
