= Luna Rossa Winery =

U.S. winery

Coordinates: 32°15′47.0″N 107°48′48.5″W

Luna Rossa Winery is an American winery in Deming, New Mexico. It owns New Mexico Vineyards, the largest vineyard in New Mexico.

Luna Rossa was founded by Paolo and Sylvia D'Andrea in June 2005.

== See also ==
- List of wineries in New Mexico
- New Mexico wine
