= Blood Moon =

Blood Moon or Bloodmoon may refer to:

== Folklore and tradition ==
- Hunter's moon, the first full moon after the harvest moon
- Xquic, a mythological Mayan heroine sometimes glossed as "Blood Moon" or "Blood Girl/Maiden" in English
- Blood Moon (eclipse), a popular term to describe the reddish color of the Moon during the total lunar eclipse
  - Blood moon prophecy, a prophecy surrounding the tetrad of lunar eclipses beginning April 2014

== Film ==
- Bloodmoon (1990 film), an Australian horror film
- Bloodmoon (1997 film), an American martial arts film
- Blood Moon (2014 film), a British Western horror film
- Bloody Moon, a Spanish-German horror film
- Wolf Girl (film), a film with the alternate title Blood Moon

== Literature ==
- Blood Moon (novel), a 2009 novel by Garry Disher
- Blood Moon, a 2025 novel by Sandra Brown
- Blood Moon, a 2022 novel by Heather Graham and Jon Land
- Blood Moon, a 1996 novel by Hal Lindsey
- Blood Moon, a 2019 nonfiction book by John Sedgwick

== Music ==
- Blood Moon (Apes & Androids album), a 2008 album by Apes & Androids
- Blood Moon (Cold Chisel album), a 2019 album by Cold Chisel
- Blood Moon, a 2022 album by RY X
- Blood Moon (EP), a 2021 EP by Oneus
- Bloodmoon: I, a 2021 album by Converge and Chelsea Wolfe, and "Blood Moon", a song on the album
- "Blood Moon", a 2022 single by Starbenders
- "Bloodmoon", a 2023 song by Kamelot from The Awakening

== Television ==
- Bloodmoon, the working title for a canceled Game of Thrones successor series
- "Blood Moon" (CSI: Miami), a 2004 episode
- "Blood Moon" (Into the Dark), a 2021 episode
- "Blood Moon" (Quantum Leap), a 1993 episode
- "Blood Moon" (Sleepy Hollow), a 2013 episode

== Games ==
- The Elder Scrolls III: Bloodmoon, an expansion to the 2002 video game Morrowind

== See also ==
- Red Moon (disambiguation)
