= Levi Romero (poet) =

American poet and lecturer

- Born: April 5, 1961 (age 65); Dixon, New Mexico, U.S.

Academic background
- Education: University of New Mexico (BA, MA)

Academic work
- Discipline: Architecture; Creative writing Chicano studies
- Sub-discipline: Poetry; Pueblo Revival architecture

Levi Romero (born April 5, 1961) is an American poet, academic, architect, and lecturer in creative writing and Chicano studies at the University of New Mexico. In 2012, he was named the centennial poet for New Mexico.

== Early life and education ==
Romero was born in Dixon, New Mexico, located in the Embudo Valley. He enrolled at Española Valley High School in Española, New Mexico. He soon transferred to Peñasco High School in Penasco, New Mexico. Romero ultimately graduated from Menaul Boarding School in Albuquerque. After graduating from Menaul, Romero attended the University of New Mexico, where he earned a Bachelor of Arts in architecture in 1994 and Master of Arts in architecture 2000.

Romero has described his upbringing as "communal," noting that the families who inhabited the valley often shared child-rearing duties and other familial responsibilities. Romero's first language was New Mexican Spanish. He subsequently learned English in elementary school. Romero has stated that though he considers himself Chicano, he prefers the term Nuevoméxicano, or "New Mexican." Further, the manito dialect, which is central to the region of Northern New Mexico, colors the bulk of the language seen of Romero's work.

== Career ==
=== Poetry ===
Romero writes almost entirely in free-verse form. He writes his poems in both English and Spanish. His first full book of poetry (In the Gathering of Silence) was published in 1996. By 2010, Romero continued to write on the side while working as a visiting Research Scholar in the School of Architecture and Planning at UNM.

The cultural and geographical landscapes of the Embudo Valley influences many of Romero's early and later works. A notable example is his poem "Tres Copas de Chanate Black and Sweet," which features characteristics of Romero's hometown and the surrounding area. A portion of the poem reads:

"pickup trucks once danced

into the Royal Fork restaurant parking lot

from Gallup and Farmington

slipping through the honeydew

sweetness of ripening September"

A concept that Romero frequently deals with in his poetry is counterculture, primarily that which exists in the Southwest. The primary counterculture Romero examines is the lowrider (lowcura in Spanish). The lowrider tradition is known as a cultural marker in not only the Embudo Valley where Romero grew up, but in multiple places across the Southwest. In brief, the lowrider can be reasonably described as someone who modifies classic cars such that the body of the vehicle rides very close to the ground. Romero considers low-riding as a vehicle through which to express one's identity. This can be seen in the poem "Wheels," which was published in the Gathering of Silence. A particular aspect Romero touches on is the so-called enchantment of the low-ride. He writes:

"how can I tell you

baby, oh honey, you'll

never know the ride

the ride of a lowered chevy

slithering through the blue dotted night along

Riverside Drive Española."

Romero also derives inspiration from the everyday and the commonplace. Many of his poems feature snippets of conversation from strangers or interactions that might otherwise seem unimportant. For example, "Corner of 5th & Central, featured in A Poetry of Remembrance, takes place on a street corner. Romero writes:

"I am on the corner of 5th & Central

albuquerque, new mexico

united states of America

northern hemisphere

the planet is divided up into four quadrants

how I got started carving?"

=== Documentary work ===
Romero has cultivated an active interest in filmmaking in addition to his poetry. Similar to his poetry, the focus of his documentaries centers around the cultural landscape of New Mexico and the people therein. One of his documentaries, "Going Home Homeless," won the People's Choice Award at the 2014 Taos Film Festival.

=== Prizes and recognition ===
In the preface to A Poetry of Remembrance, Chicano author Rudolfo Anaya wrote: “The spiritual essence of the Rio Grande corridor and its tributaries shines in every poem. From the loco to the sublime, Levi's poems are a blessing on our heads.”

A Poetry of Remembrance was described by the Albuquerque Journal: "Whether recalling a 'love-hate' relationship' with his high school English teacher or remembering a street-corner encounter, Romero sees and hears the courage, grace, honesty, and beauty so many of us often miss. It is the poet's job to remind us of those things, and Romero does this admirably."

In addition to being named centennial poet of New Mexico in 2012, he was named as the state's inaugural Poet Laureate in 2020. Romero received the PBS Bill Moyers Language of Life Award.

== Published works ==
- In the Gathering of Silence (1996)
- A Poetry of Remembrance (2008)
- Sagrado: A Photopoetics Across the Chicano Homeland (2013)
