= Middle Rio Grande Valley AVA =

Wine growing region in New Mexico

Coordinates: 35°13′53″N 106°37′49″W

Middle Rio Grande Valley
- Wine region
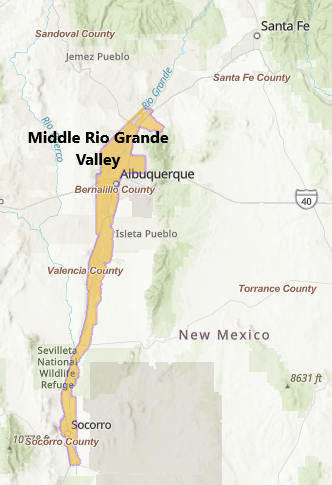
- Type: American Viticultural Area
- Year established: 1988
- Years of wine industry: 397
- Country: United States
- Part of: New Mexico
- Other regions in New Mexico: Mesilla Valley AVA, Mimbres Valley AVA
- Growing season: 180–200 days
- Climate region: Region IV-V
- Heat units: 3,795–4,726 GDD
- Precipitation (annual average): 8.1 to 9.2 in (210–230 mm)
- Soil conditions: medium, moderately or fine textured sand to clay
- Total area: 278,000 acres (435 sq mi)
- Size of planted vineyards: 458 acres (185 ha)
- No. of vineyards: 20
- Grapes produced: Cabernet Franc, Cabernet Sauvignon, Chardonnay, Gewürztraminer, Merlot, Pinot Noir, Riesling
- No. of wineries: 11

Middle Rio Grande Valley is an American Viticultural Area (AVA) located in Central New Mexico with a viticulture heritage dating back to 1629. The region extends from just south of Santa Fe to the bosque of the Rio Grande, centering around the Albuquerque metropolitan area. It was established as the nation's 98th and the state's third wine appellation on February 2, 1988, by the Bureau of Alcohol, Tobacco and Firearms (ATF), Treasury after reviewing the petition submitted by the Middle Rio Grande Chapter of the New Mexico Wine and Vine Society of Albuquerque, on behalf of local vintners, proposing a viticultural area named "Middle Rio Grande Valley."
The viticultural area encompasses 278,400 acres (112,700 ha) of land in a narrow valley no wider than 19 miles (31 km) along the Rio Grande valley from Santa Fe southward for approximately 106 miles (171 km) to San Antonio south of Albuquerque. The land ranges from 4,000 to 6,500 feet (1,200–2,000 m) in elevation. The climate is semi-arid, with warm days and cool nights. Sub-freezing temperatures occur in the winter.
The area consists of an irrigated valley of approximately 435 square miles (278,000 acres). At the outset, there were 6 bonded wineries in the viticultural area with others planned for the near future. A variety of Vitis vinifera and French hybrid grapes are grown. New Mexico State University has conducted viticultural research in test vineyards in the Middle Rio Grande Valley at the Los Lunas Agricultural Science Center. The plant hardiness zones are 7a and 7b.

== History ==
Winemaking began in the Middle Rio Grande Valley with the establishment of Franciscan missions in the seventeenth century. Grapes were first planted near Socorro County around 1630 by Fray Garcia de Zuniga 140 years before the Californian region produced wine. W.H. Davis wrote a book in 1857, titled El Gringo, that described a favorable claret that came from Bernalillo (Sandoval County]. A U.S. Department of Agriculture census of viticulture in the U.S. in 1880 listed New Mexico as fifth in the nation in wine production, with 3,150 acres (1,270 ha) of vineyards producing 908,500 US gal (3,439,000 L; 756,500 imp gal) of wine. Governor William G. Ritch wrote of the grape growing belt along the Rio Grande in The History, Resources and Attractions of New Mexico (1885). Winemaking continued in the Middle Rio Grande Valley until Prohibition in 1920 when most vineyards were replaced by other crops. After the Repeal of Prohibition in 1933, viticulture was revived but on a smaller scale.

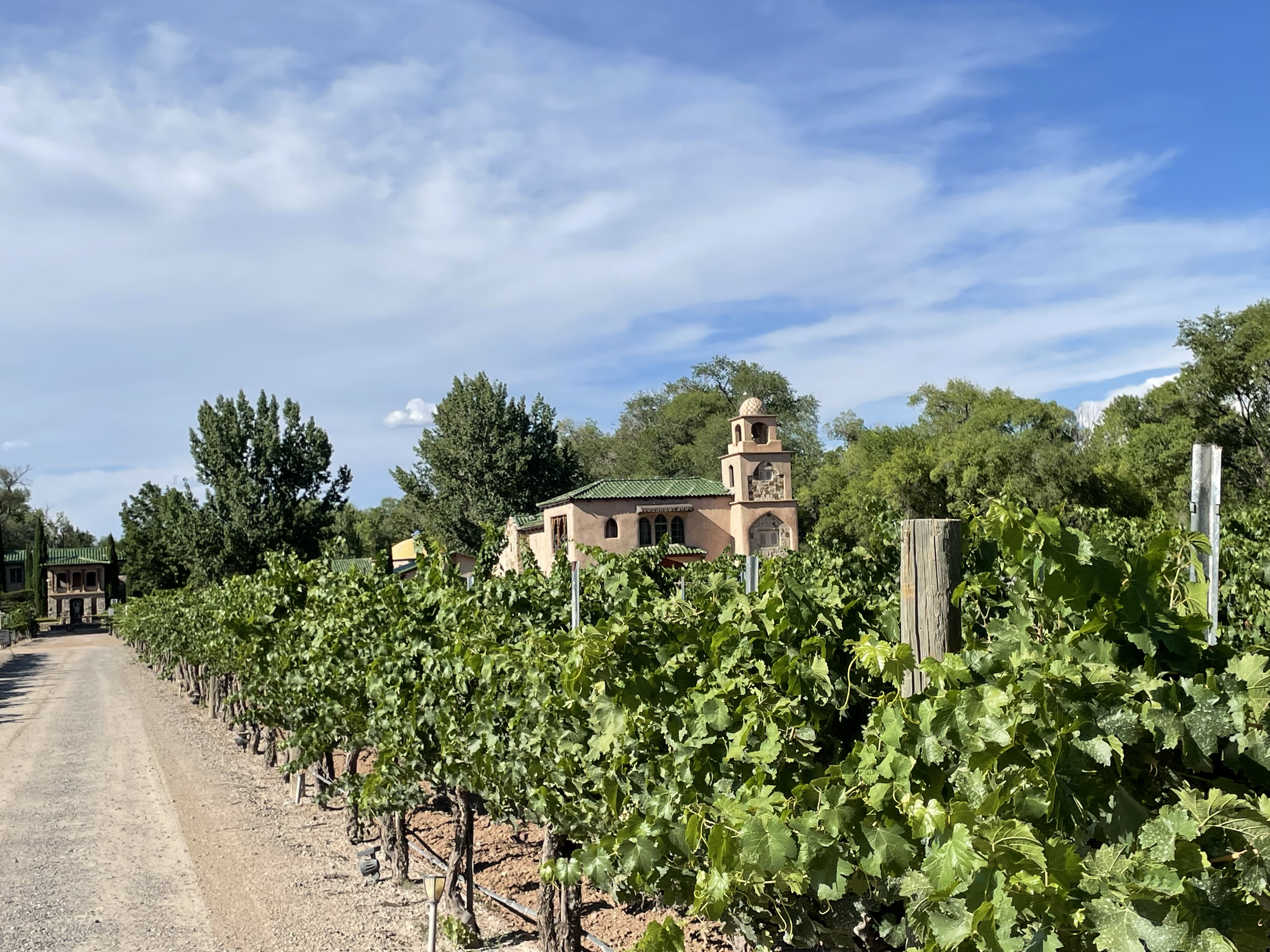
Casa Rondena Winery, Los Ranchos de Albuquerque

== Terroir ==
=== Topography ===
The viticultural area follows the Rio Grande River and surrounding irrigated land for the length of 106 mi (171 km). Elevations within the area range from approximately 4,800 to 5,200 feet (1,500–1,600 m) above sea level. The surrounding mountain areas located to the north, east, west and southwest have much higher elevations. There soils, water availability and climates differ from the Middle Rio Grande Valley area. Based on the evidence provided in the notice of proposed rulemaking, ATF finds that the Middle Rio Grande Valley viticultural area defines a region with unique climate and growing conditions and distinct valley features different from the surrounding areas.

=== Climate ===
The climate in the Middle Rio Grande Valley is classified as arid continental type and it is characterized by low rainfall, warm summers, and mild winters. Most precipitation occurs during summer months as brief thunder showers. Snow occurs occasionally in the winter but accumulations are small. Winds are light to moderate and usually stronger during Spring months. The average number of days without killing frost ranges between 180 and 200 days in this belt. Minimum and maximum daily temperatures fluctuate 30 to 35 degrees. Two tables were published in the notice of proposed rulemaking showing the climate comparisons between the Middle Rio Grande Valley and the surrounding areas.

=== Soils ===
Middle Rio Grande Valley viticultural area is located in a Basin province of the Warm Desert Region of New Mexico. The Rio Grande River is the principal drainage for the Middle Rio Grande Valley. Soils within the viticultural area are on the nearly level floodplain adjacent to the river and are deep, highly stratified and typically non- gravelly. The Typic Torrifluvent association is developed in alluvium of mixed origin. Most of the soil within this association is medium, moderately fine or fine textured, and a high percentage of it is well suited to irrigation for a wide variety of crops. Subsurface layers are similar but may range in texture from sand to clay. Representative soil series of the Middle Rio Grande Valley are of Gila, Glendale or Vinton series. By contrast, soils adjacent to the viticultural area that occur on the strongly sloping uplands north of the Rio Grande plain have soils of the Typic Torriorthents which have gravelly, sandy surface layers and coarse textured subsurface layers. Soil series in this area are Bluepoint and Caliza. Higher soils are rough broken lands of Nickel and Canutio series and include a layer of gravel with subsurface caliche and clay layers. Steep side slopes cut with streambeds often show exposed areas of bedrock in the eroded hilly areas.

== Viticulture ==
In 1988, there were six bonded wineries in the viticultural area with a total capacity in excess of 216,500 US gal (820,000 L; 180,300 imp gal) of wine per year. At least two more wineries were in the planning or construction phases. There were twenty growers with more than one acre (0.40 ha) of wine grapes in the viticultural area with a total acreage of approximately 458 acres (185 ha). Grape varieties grown in the Middle Rio Grande Valley, in descending order of acreage, include Vidal Blanc, Chancellor, Seyval Blanc, Villard Blanc, Chelois, Leon Millot, Pinot Chardonnay, De Chaunac, Baco Noir, Steuben and others.

== See also ==
- New Mexico wine
