= Deming Armory =

Historic armory in Luna County, New Mexico, United States

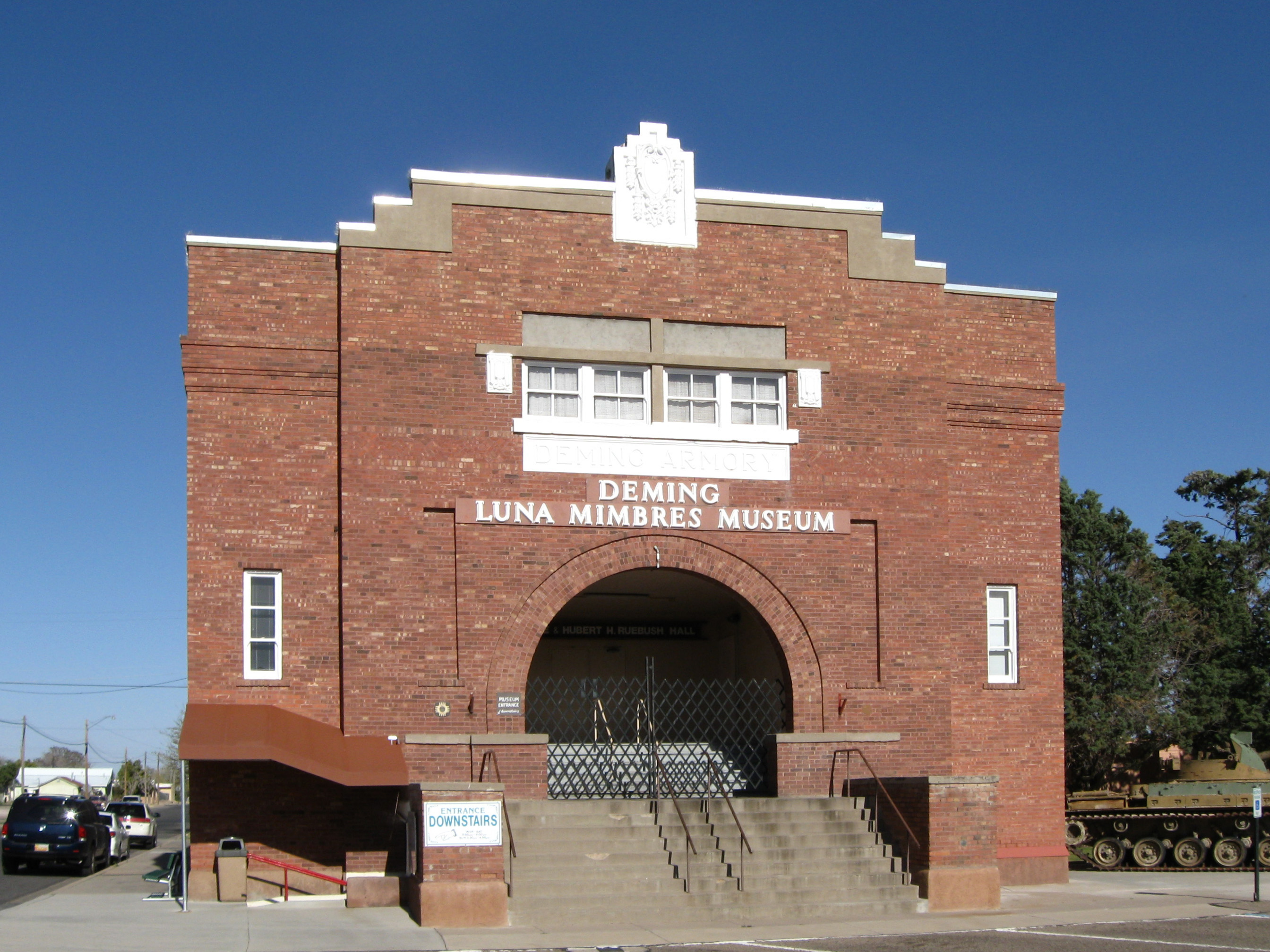
- Deming Armory in 2009
- Interactive map of the Deming Armory area
- Former names: State Armory
- Alternative names: Deming Luna Mimbres Museum

General information
- Status: Used as a museum
- Type: Government armory
- Architectural style: Castellated style
- Location: 301 South Silver Avenue, Deming, New Mexico, United States
- Coordinates: 32°15′58″N 107°45′29″W
- Elevation: 4,337 ft (1,322 m)
- Current tenants: Deming Luna Mimbres Museum
- Construction started: 1915
- Completed: 1916
- Cost: US$17,500
- Client: US Department of the Army
- Owner: Luna County Historical Society

Dimensions
- Other dimensions: 50 feet (15 m) across x 132 feet (40 m) deep

Technical details
- Floor count: 2
- Floor area: 14,000 sq ft (1,300 m^{2})

Design and construction
- Architect: Henry C. Trost
- Architecture firm: Trost & Trost
- Main contractor: W. W. Barracks

Other information
- Public transit: Deming
- Deming Armory
- U.S. National Register of Historic Places
- NM State Register of Cultural Properties
- Location within New Mexico
- Architect: Henry C. Trost
- NRHP reference No.: 83001624
- NMSRCP No.: 584

Significant dates
- Added to NRHP: April 21, 1983
- Designated NMSRCP: January 20, 1978

The Deming Armory (formerly known as the State Armory, now also known as the Deming Luna Mimbres Museum) is a historic armory in the United States, located at 301 South Silver Avenue in Deming, Luna County, New Mexico. The building was built for the United States Department of the Army in 1915–16, and is currently being used as the premises for the local museum in Deming. The armory was added to the New Mexico State Register of Cultural Properties in 1978 and was listed on the National Register of Historic Places in 1983.

== History ==
The building, designed by architect Henry C. Trost, was originally constructed as a National Guard armory. The building was the first armory to be built after New Mexico became a state in 1912. It was constructed to train soldiers to guard the border with Mexico during the ongoing Mexican Revolution.

The armory served the New Mexico National Guard for 60 years. The building housed a chapter of the USO during World War II, in support of the men training at Deming Army Airfield. During the years that the building served as a military facility, it was also used as a community center for hosting dances, basketball games and other local events.

Two events in 1976 contributed towards the launch of a campaign to acquire the Deming Armory as new premises for the town's museum. First, the National Guard vacated the building and moved to a new facility on the south side of Deming. Second, a local businessman, Hubert Ruebush, offered to donate his mother's old electric washing machine, the first such washer in Deming, to the museum. When Ruebush learned that the museum could not accommodate the washer in its cramped facilities, he donated $6000 to acquire the armory on the condition that his donation be matched through local fundraising. Ruebush's condition was quickly satisfied, and a delegation from Deming subsequently negotiated a selling price of $11,500 for the building with the State Armory Board in Santa Fe.

== Architecture ==
The Deming Armory is an imposing red-brick building, two stories in height and resting on a raised basement. It comprises three bays along the front elevation, with a depth of nine bays, and pilasters divide the side elevations. The facade is characterized by decorative brickwork, concrete detailing, and a large central arch leading to double-leaf doors. The walls of the building are 13 inches (330 mm) thick.

== Deming Luna Mimbres Museum ==
The Deming Luna Mimbres Museum, also known as the Deming Luna County Museum, is operated by the Luna County Historical Society. The museum's exhibits focus on the everyday lives and history of area residents. Collections include Mimbres pottery, dolls and toys, glass, china, crystal, teapots, silver, copper and Depression glass, and saddles and ranching equipment. Other exhibits include period rooms, furniture, paintings, tools, clothes, Native American artifacts, gems and geodes, weapons, war memorabilia, vehicles and farm equipment.

== See also ==
- National Register of Historic Places listings in Luna County, New Mexico
