= St. Clair Winery =

Coordinates: 32°15′28″N 107°39′52″W

St. Clair Winery is an American wine brand from Deming, New Mexico, founded in 1984 by Bob A. Winery who arrived in the area in 1982. After the winery filed for Chapter 11 following a frost and financial issues, the Lescombes family purchased the winery and land.

As of January 2020, St. Clair Winery's Mimbres Red is made in the Mimbres Valley in Luna County by the Lescombes Family Vineyards. The site used to produce the wine is located 50 miles (80 km) west of Deming, New Mexico, just east of Lordsburg, New Mexico. It is the largest yielding vineyard in New Mexico and covers 220 acres (89 ha). The company is owned and operated by Florent, Emmanuel, and Rebecca Lescombes.

St. Clair Winery produces a broad range of New Mexico wines, including red, white, sparkling, dessert, and specialty bottlings. St. Clair is also known for its chile-infused wine made with Hatch peppers, for which it was awarded a US$50,000 US Federal grant for value-added agricultural products in 2014.

The Lescombes family's company-owned locations were re-branded under the "D.H. Lescombes" name in Spring of 2019. Besides the D.H. Lescombes Winery & Tasting Room in Deming, there are D.H. Lescombes Winery & Bistro locations in Albuquerque and Las Cruces. A location in Santa Fe named Hervé Wine Bar, was opened in 2018.

Today, the St. Clair Winery brand is still Lescombes family-owned and made since 1991. It is sold at various retailers in New Mexico. The wines are distributed by National Distributing Company within the state of New Mexico.

== See also ==
- List of wineries in New Mexico
- New Mexico wine
