= Henry Street Gang =

The Henry Street Gang was a Chicago street gang of the late nineteenth century.

Formed by Chris Merry in the early 1890s, the Henry Street Gang was based in Chicago's Southwest Side committing armed robbery against local merchants and street peddlers. Based along Maxwell and Halsted Streets, the gang often stole from local businesses while posing as push cart vendors. The gang developed a method of robbery known as the "kick in" where Merry and six members would pull up to a local store and, with one man staying with the wagon and two lookouts outside, Merry and the other members would kick in the entrance and haul off the stores merchandise onto the wagon. The gang continued to raid Southside neighborhoods for several years until Merry was hanged for murdering his invalid wife. The gang disappeared within some months thereafter. The gang's "kick in" robbery would later be used during the 1930s by Depression-era criminals such as John Dillinger and others.
