= Henry St. =

Studio album by The Tallest Man On Earth
- Released: April 14, 2023
- Genres: Folk rock, Indie Rock
- Length: 42:09
- Label: Anti-

The Tallest Man On Earth chronology
Too Late For Edelweiss (2022)	Henry St. (2023)

Singles from Henry St.
- 1. "Every Little Heart" Released: February 1, 2023; 2. "Henry St." Released: March 6, 2023; 3. "Looking For Love" Released: April 12, 2023

Henry St. is the sixth studio album by Swedish folk musician The Tallest Man On Earth. It was released on 14 April 2023 by Anti-.

== Critical reception ==
Critical reception for Henry St. was generally positive. The album has a score of 74 out of 100 on the review aggregate website Metacritic based on reviews from 5 critics.

== Track listing ==
All songs by Kristian Matsson except where noted. Music By Kristian Matsson. Lyrics by Kristian Matsson and Amelia Meath.

No.	Title	Writer(s)	Length
1.	"Bless You"	Amelia Meath	4:03
2.	"Looking For Love"		3:35
3.	"Every Little Heart"		3:09
4.	"Slowly Rivers Turn"		3:35
5.	"Major League"		3:06
6.	"Henry St."		4:29
7.	"In Your Garden Still"		4:29
8.	"Goodbye"		4:04
9.	"Italy"		4:30
10.	"New Religion"		4:24
11.	"Foothills"		2:41
Total length:			42:09

Professional ratings
Aggregate scores
Source	Rating
Metacritic	74/100
Review scores
Source	Rating
Sputnikmusic	4.3/5 stars
Clash Music	7/10
AllMusic	3.5/5 stars
Pitchfork	6.0
Spectrum Culture	75%

== Personnel ==
Credits adapted from the album liner notes.

- Kristian Matsson – Vocals, Acoustic Guitar, Feedback, Banjo, Ukulele (Track 7), 12-String Guitar
- Ryan Gustafson – Classical Guitar, Electric Guitar, Lap Steel, Ukulele (Track 9)
- TJ Maiani – Drums (Track 1, 3, 4, 5, 7, 8 and 10)
- Nick Sanborn – Bass, Electronics, Piano (Track 1, 2 and 5), Organ (Track 2), Drums (Track 2), Drum Programming
- CJ Camerieri – Trumpet, French Horn
- Adam Schatz – Saxophone
- Phil Cook – Piano (Tracks 6, 9, 10 and 11), Keys, Organ (Track 7, 8, 9 and 11), Wulitzer
- Rob Moose – Strings
