= La Viña Winery =

American winery in La Union, New Mexico

Coordinates: 31°58′11.6″N 106°39′9.1″W

La Viña Winery is an American winery in La Union, New Mexico. It was established in 1977 and is the oldest continuously running winery in New Mexico. The winery was bought by Ken and Denise Stark in 1993. They moved the winery, originally located in southern New Mexico, to La Union, building a new winery but retaining the old name. The winery co-sponsored a grape-growing workshop with New Mexico State University's Cooperative Extension Service and Texas Cooperative Extension in September 2004.

== See also ==
- List of wineries in New Mexico
- New Mexico wine
