= Dixon, New Mexico =

Census-designated place in Rio Arriba, New Mexico, United States

- Census-designated place
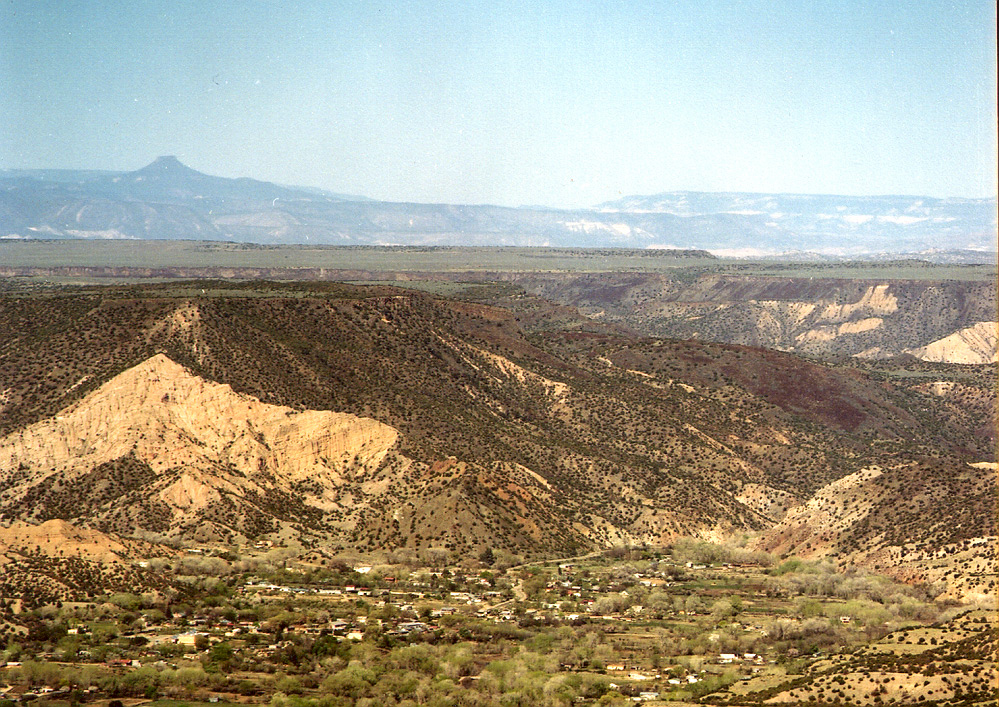

- Location in New Mexico Location in the United States
- Coordinates: 36°11′22″N 105°51′50″W
- Country: United States
- State: New Mexico
- County: Rio Arriba

Area
  - Total: 11.61 sq mi (30.06 km^{2})
  - Land: 11.53 sq mi (29.87 km^{2})
  - Water: 0.073 sq mi (0.19 km^{2})
- Elevation: 6,188 ft (1,886 m)

Population (2020)
  - Total: 938
  - Density: 81/sq mi (31.4/km^{2})
- Time zone: UTC-7 (Mountain (MST))
  - Summer (DST): UTC-6 (MDT)
- ZIP code: 87527
- FIPS code: 35-20830
- GNIS feature ID: 2584088

Dixon is an unincorporated community located in Rio Arriba County, New Mexico, United States, on New Mexico State Road 75, just east of New Mexico State Road 68, in the north-central part of the state, and is approximately 20 miles (32 km) southwest of Taos. The elevation of Dixon is 6,028 feet (1,837 m) above sea level. It is on the banks of the Embudo Creek, a tributary of the Rio Grande. Embudo Creek flows into the Rio Grande two miles (3.2 km) downstream from Dixon.

As of the 2020 census, Dixon had a population of 938. About 70% of residents identify as Hispanic. Many non-Hispanics have made their homes here since the mid-1960s.

== History ==
The area was inhabited by Tiwa peoples from nearby Picuris Pueblo, then settled by Spanish colonists under the 1725 Embudo Land Grant. The original name was El Puerto del Embudo de Nuestro Señor San Antonio and the grant was made in 1725, to Francisco Martín, Lázaro Córdova and Juan Márquez. The acequias (irrigation canals) were the first public works project of any land grant, so they were started immediately after settlement, on September 20, 1725, and there are 10 Historic Acequias with senior water rights on the Embudo River and one with junior water rights. On the Rio Grande there are two with senior rights and two with junior water rights. The aldea was known as San Antonio del Embudo until around 1900 when a post office was established and the name was changed to Dixon, reputedly to honor Collins Dixon, a school teacher who taught here in the late 19th century; one tradition has him being a Civil War army deserter; his descendants live around nearby Española.

== Climate and wineries ==
Because of the temperate climate generated by the local topography and helped by the acequias (irrigation ditch system), the Embudo Valley has become a significant fruit and grape growing area and the greater Dixon area has two wineries, the La Chiripada Winery and the Vivác Winery.

== Art and the Dixon Studio Tour ==
The substantial number of artists and craft people living in the area led to the 1982 creation of the Dixon Studio Tour which annually draws many visitors during the two days in November that it occupies. There are several galleries in the area, including: Rift Gallery, Rare Earth Gallery, Alluvial, and Metier Fine Handweaving and Craft. Annual summer stonecarving workshops are held at Southwest Stoneworks adjacent to Rift Gallery.

== Points of interest ==
About 2 miles (3.2 km) north of the town on New Mexico State Road 75, rock and mineral collectors can visit the Harding Mine, a pegmatite mine donated to the University of New Mexico by Dr. Arthur Montgomery. Maps and release forms to visit the mine can be obtained at the University of New Mexico, Department of Earth and Planetary Sciences, or at the Dixon home of Gilbert Griego, mine caretaker, or at the Embudo Valley Library in Dixon.

== Community ==
Dixon is home to the community supported Embudo Valley Library, radio station KLDK-LP and the Dixon Cooperative Market, and during the summer months the Dixon Farmers' Market. It also has a retreat center, at Mission Embudo, which offers space for workshops and retreats.

== Education ==
It is in Española Public Schools. Dixon has one elementary school, Dixon Elementary. The comprehensive public high school is Española Valley High School.

== Demographics ==
Historical population
Census	Pop.	Note	%±
2020	938		—
U.S. Decennial Census

== Notable people ==
- Al Hurricane, musician often referred to as "The Godfather" of New Mexico music
- Levi Romero, poet, architect, and professor at the University of New Mexico
