= New Mexico wine =

Wine made from grapes in New Mexico, United States

New Mexico
- Wine region
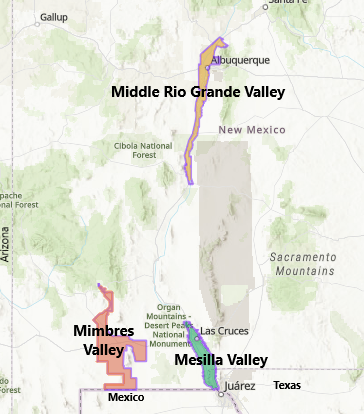
- New Mexico's AVAs
- Official name: State of New Mexico
- Type: U.S. State Appellation
- Year established: 1912
- Years of wine industry: 397
- Country: United States
- Sub-regions: Mesilla Valley AVA, Middle Rio Grande Valley AVA, Mimbres Valley AVA.
- Total area: 78 million acres (121,298 sq mi)
- Size of planted vineyards: 1,200 acres (490 ha)
- Grapes produced: Cabernet Sauvignon, Zinfandel, Sangiovese, Pinot noir, Ruby Cabernet, Nebbiolo, Dolcetto, Refosco, Barbera, Merlot, Petite Sirah, Syrah, Tempranillo, Cabernet Franc, Mourvèdre, Gewurztraminer, Chardonnay, Chenin blanc, Malvasia bianca, Muscat Canelli, Pinot gris, Viognier, Riesling, Muscat of Alexandria, Orange Muscat, Sauvignon blanc, Baco noir, Chambourcin, De Chaunac, Leon Millot, Marechal Foch, Seyval blanc, Vidal blanc, Villard blanc
- No. of wineries: Over 42

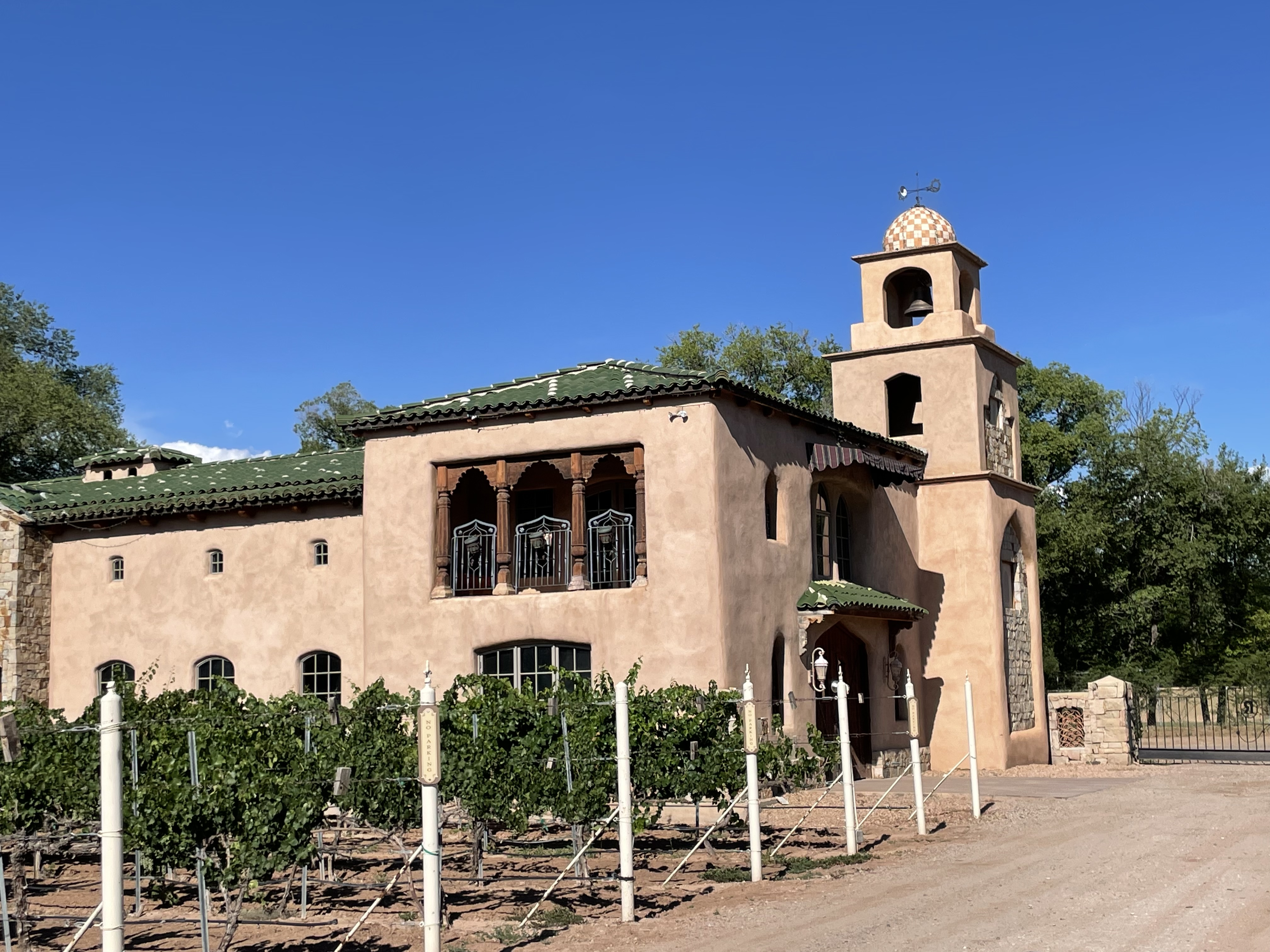
Casa Rondena Winery, Los Ranchos de Albuquerque, NM. July, 2022.

New Mexico wine refers to wine made from grapes grown in the U.S. state appellation of New Mexico and is home to the oldest wine-making tradition in the United States. Its American wine production lies primarily along the Rio Grande River flowing from the capital of Santa Fe, by the city of Albuquerque with its surrounding metropolitan area, and through the Mesilla Valley. Viticulture also thrives in the Mimbres River valley. In 1629, Franciscan friar Garcia de San Francisco y Zǘñiga and a Capuchín friar named Antonio de Arteaga planted the first wine grapes in Santa Fe de Nuevo México, in what became the current Middle Rio Grande Valley AVA. Consequently, wineries reside in the aforementioned Middle Rio Grande Valley, as well as the Mesilla Valley AVA and the Mimbres Valley AVA.

Viticulture took hold since its 1629 introduction, in the middle Rio Grande and the surrounding area, and by the year 1880 grapes were grown on over 3,000 acres (1,214 ha), and wineries produced over 1,000,000 US gallons (3,800,000 L) of wine. The editor of the Socorro bulletin predicted in 1880 that "We see in the present attention given to grape culture, an important and growing industry which, in a few years, will assume proportions of no ordinary nature."

The wine industry in New Mexico declined in the latter decades of the nineteenth century in part due to flooding of the Río Grande. Prohibition also forced many wineries to close, while others remained operational providing sacramental wine to primarily Catholic as well as other Christian churches. The modern New Mexico wine industry received significant support in 1978 when a government-sponsored study encouraged winegrowers to grow New Mexican heritage grapes, and to work in collaboration with Italian, Spanish and French wineries to make hybrid grape varieties.

New Mexico now has more than 60 wineries producing 900,000 US gallons (3,400,000 L) of wine annually.

== History ==
=== Origins of viticulture in New Mexico ===
In 1598 Santa Fe de Nuevo México was founded, after Don Juan de Oñate led Spanish colonists to the upper valleys of the Rio Grande near Española, New Mexico. Santa Fe, New Mexico was established in 1610, and further south near the Mesilla Valley Franciscans followed the colonists to minister Christianity to the Native Americans and Hispanos of New Mexico. The Franciscans who settled along the Rio Grande needed to hold daily mass; central to each mass was Holy Communion, a sacrament that includes the consumption of wine, which upon transubstantiation, becomes the blood of Christ shed for the redemptions of sinners. The friars needed a local source for their sacramental wine since the next nearest supply was several months' travel away. In this region of the Upper Río Grande is where grape vines were first introduced to New Mexico.

Before grapevines were planted in New Mexico, the Franciscans had wine shipped from Spain. The sacramental wine was light pink in color, had a sherry-like taste, was 18% alcohol, and 10% sugar. The wine was transported in heavy jugs resembling those in Roman times. The stoneware jugs held approximately 2.6 to 3.6 gallons (9.8 to 13.6 liters) each and were sealed with a cork or wood plug. The jugs needed to be sealed with a green glaze, applied to the inside of the jug. This glaze would have contained lead that leaked out into the wine during prolonged exposure to heat or to the acid in the wine.

Grapevine planting in New Mexico was initially hindered by Spanish law which in 1595 forbid the exportation of Spanish grapevines to protect the Spanish agriculture industry. At the time, Spanish wine exports provided one fourth of Spain's foreign trade revenue. Franciscans chose to ignore this economic law and smuggled vines out of Spain into New Mexico around 1629. Fray García de Zúñiga, a Franciscan, and Antonio de Arteaga, a Capuchín friar, planted the first vines at a Piro pueblo just south of modern-day Socorro. The cuttings brought by the missionaries were a Vitis vinifera grape variety known as the Mission grape. This variety is still grown in New Mexico today.

As El Camino Real arrived in New Mexico, the city of Albuquerque was established to serve as an outpost for all of the towns and pueblos in the central Rio Grande. Wine was grown in these old towns, including near Barelas, Corrales, Old Town Albuquerque, Sandia Pueblo, Los Ranchos, and Isleta Pueblo. This region is now referred to as the Middle Rio Grande Valley AVA.

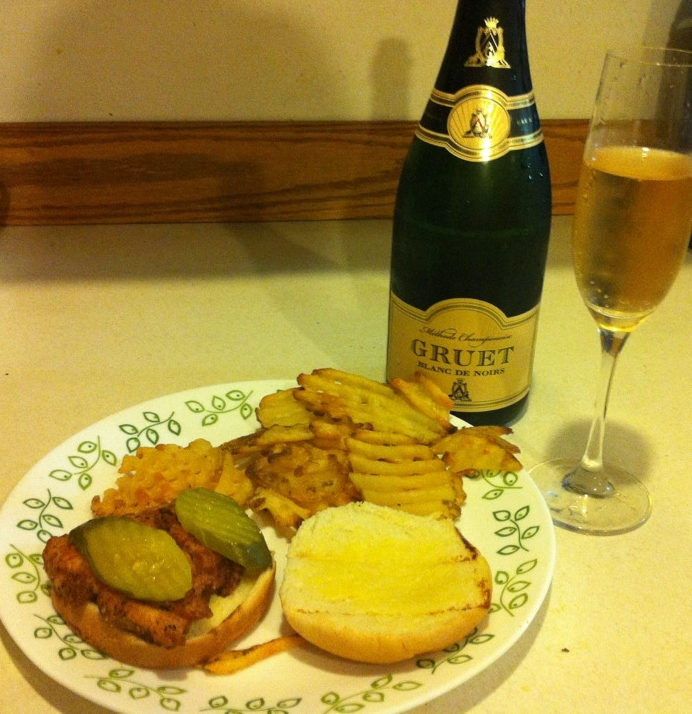
Sparkling wine made in New Mexico

=== Expansion of the wine industry in New Mexico ===
Between 1633 and 1800, numerous events took place which threatened the wine industry in New Mexico. Several pueblo revolts and hard winters threatened the grapes, but by the 1800s New Mexico had emerged as wine country. In 1800, vineyards were planted from Bernalillo to Socorro in central New Mexico and from Las Cruces to El Paso, Texas in the southern part of the state. In 1850, New Mexico became a territory of the United States. In 1868, Jesuit priests settled in New Mexico and brought their Italian wine making techniques, founding a winery in 1872. In 1870, New Mexico produced 16,000 US gallons (61,000 L) of wine. By 1880, New Mexico produced 908,000 US gallons (3,440,000 L). The 1880 census indicated that New Mexico had twice the grapevine area of New York, a more developed state. New Mexico was fifth in the nation in wine production.

New Mexico State University has long played a part in the cultivation, expansion, and education of grape growing and winemaking in New Mexico. In 1920, at the beginning of Prohibition in the United States, Giovanni Giorgio Rinaldi took over production of Christian Brothers Winery in Bernalillo. He enlisted the help of faculty at New Mexico A & M College, in Las Cruces, now New Mexico State University. With their help, Rinaldi improved grape production and experimented with other grape varieties and grape growing styles. Zinfandel, a grape from Europe Primitivo, was the result of experimentation with grape varieties by Rinaldi and New Mexico A & M. Rinaldi remained Christian Brother's Winery manager until 1933 when prohibition ended.

=== Decline and rebirth ===
Grapevine nursery at the largest vineyard in Deming, New Mexico

At the turn of the twentieth century, the Río Grande and its tributaries experienced extensive flooding. In 1926, the first Río Grande flood occurred that impacted the vineyards throughout the grape growing region, from Bernalillo to El Paso. Prohibition began in 1919, and only a small amount of medicinal alcohol could be legally produced and sold. Though the sale of wine was hindered, the grapevine acreage doubled between 1920 and 1930. In 1943, the largest Río Grande flood of the century destroyed vineyards throughout New Mexico. Vineyards that had been producing wine for fifty years were destroyed. What remained of the old commercial wine industry in New Mexico never recovered from these floods.

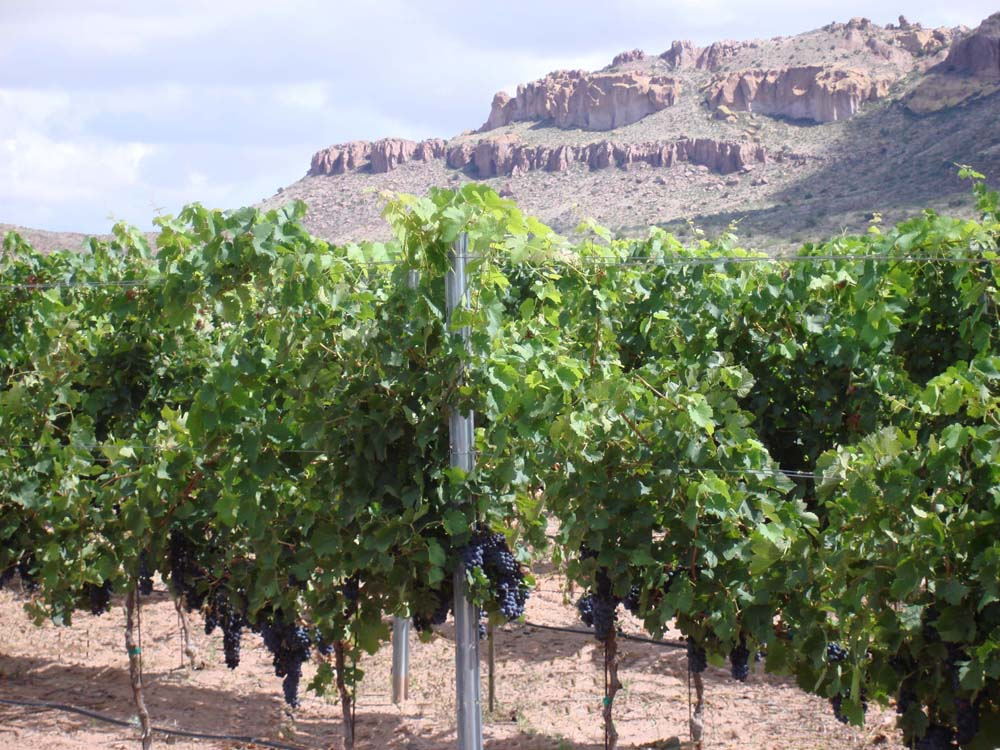
Southern New Mexico vineyard

By 1977, small commercial wineries opened their doors, creating wine from mostly French-Hybrid grape varietals. These cold-hardy grapevines prospered in northern New Mexico. The first of these wineries to open was La Viña Winery, now the oldest continually-operating winery in New Mexico. La Chiripada Winery, in Dixon, planted its vines in 1977, the first to be planted in Northern New Mexico since Prohibition. They opened with their first vintage in 1981, and remains family-operated to this day and is New Mexico's oldest continuously-owned winery.

In 1981, the Oppenheimer Corporation began marketing plots of "vineyard" land in the Armendariz Ranch, near Engle, which drew Hervé Lescombes and his family from Burgundy, France. Many more European investors followed suit, attracted to the inexpensive land and underdeveloped wine market. Due to the lack of water rights, and the great distance for irrigation, the land was deemed unfit for farming and many investors went bankrupt or pulled-out. Hervé Lescombes continued buying better-suited portions of land across southwest New Mexico, planting again in 1982. By 1984, St. Clair Winery opened their winery and first tasting room, quickly becoming the largest winery in New Mexico. Today, Hervé Lescombes' sons, Florent and Emmanuel, own and operate 5 locations across New Mexico, with over 180 acres (73 ha) of family-owned vineyards.

Between 1982 and 1983, 2,200 acres (890 ha) of vineyards were planted around Las Cruces. By 1986, there were 7,000 acres (2,833 ha) across New Mexico, falling to 700 acres (283 ha) by 1989. Many more vineyards and extensive acres of grapes were planted until present day.

== See also ==
- List of wineries in New Mexico

== Bibliography ==
- Heald, Eleanor & Ray (March 4, 2008). "Bringing the people to the wine: How New Mexico connects wines, tourism and its unique cuisine". Appellation America.
- Peavler, Jim; Green, Ron Wayne (October 26, 1995). "New Mexico Wine Country". VIVA New Mexico!. Archived from the original on March 12, 2015.
