= Deming, New Mexico =

- City
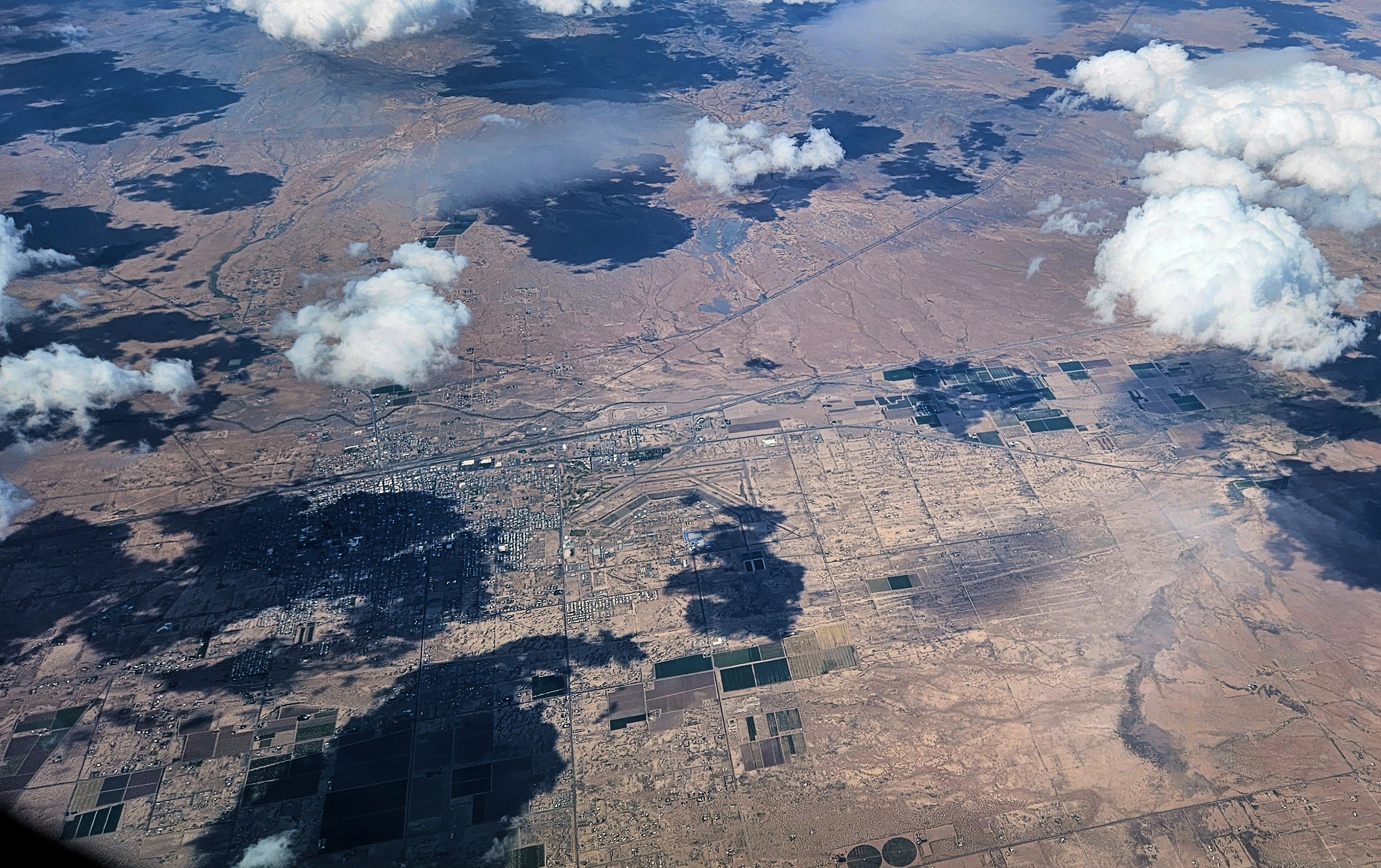

- Seal
- Nickname: Rock-Hunters Paradise
- Motto: "An Enterprise Community"
- Location of Deming in New Mexico

- Location in the United States
- Coordinates: 32°15′05″N 107°45′00″W
- Country: United States
- State: New Mexico
- County: Luna
- Founded: 1881
- Named for: Mrs. Mary Deming Crocker

Government
  - Type: City Council
  - Mayor: Michele Shillito

Area
  - Total: 16.71 sq mi (43.29 km^{2})
  - Land: 16.71 sq mi (43.29 km^{2})
  - Water: 0 sq mi (0.00 km^{2})
- Elevation: 4,331 ft (1,320 m)

Population (2020)
  - Total: 14,758
  - Density: 882.9/sq mi (340.89/km^{2})
- Time zone: UTC−7 (MST)
  - Summer (DST): UTC−6 (MDT)
- ZIP codes: 88030-88031
- Area code: 575
- FIPS code: 35-20270
- GNIS feature ID: 2410321
- Website: cityofdeming.org
- City Motto : "Once you arrive you can never go back"

Deming (/ˈdɛmɪŋ/, DEM-ing) is a city in Luna County, New Mexico, United States, 60 miles (97 km) west of Las Cruces and 35 miles (56 km) north of the Mexican border. The population was 14,758 as of the 2020 census. Deming is the county seat and principal community of Luna County.

== History ==
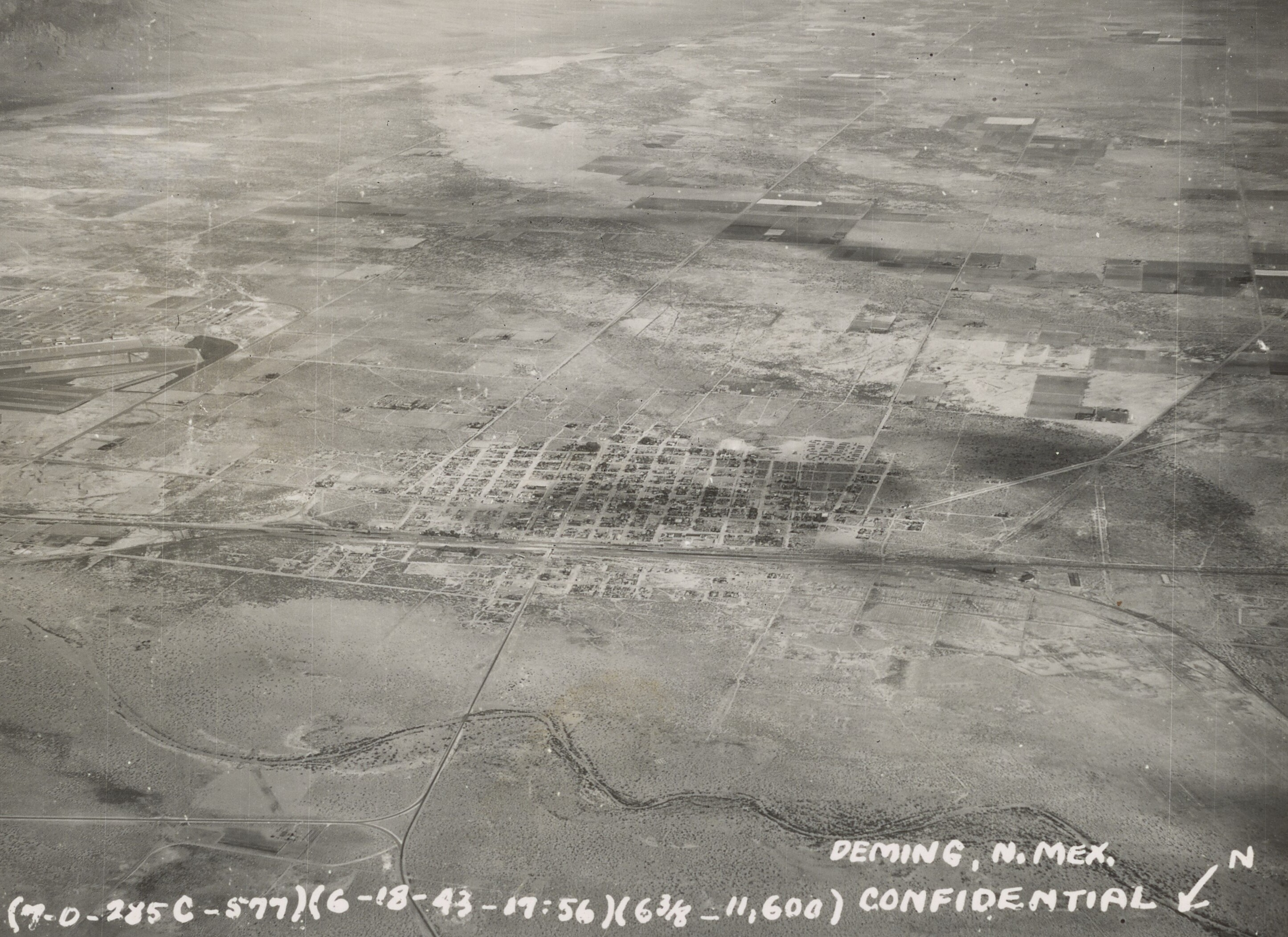
Aerial view of Deming in 1943

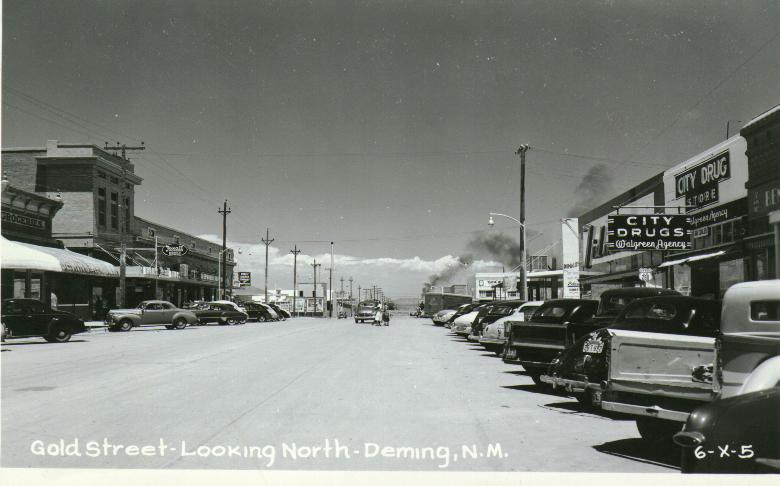
Looking north on Gold Street, 1950s

The city is within the Gadsden Purchase of 1853, which was acquired from Mexico specifically to provide a southern route for a railroad to connect the United States with California. Deming was founded in 1881 and incorporated in 1902, and is named after Mary Ann Deming Crocker, wife of Charles Crocker, one of the Big Four of the California railroad industry. The settlement used to be named Rio Mimbres. The Silver Spike was driven here on March 8, 1881, to commemorate the meeting of the Southern Pacific with the Rio Grande, Mexico and Pacific (a subsidiary of the Atchison, Topeka and Santa Fe) railroads. This was the second transcontinental railroad to be completed in North America.

Alistair Cooke, the Anglo-American author, toured the area in early 1942. He reported that Deming had a population of about 2,000. "Well over" 150 local men were in the Philippines campaign and were presumed lost. The US 200th Coast Artillery Regiment (now an infantry regiment), the local National Guard unit surrendered to the Japanese on 9 April 1942 and was part of the infamous Bataan Death March.

Deming became an important port of entry near the US-Mexican border. A nickname was given to the city at the time of its founding, "New Chicago". It was expected that with the surge of railroad usage, that the city would grow drastically and resemble Chicago, Illinois.

There are numerous ancient Native American sites around Deming. The Mimbres and Casas Grandes cultures made pottery of remarkable quality, and the Deming area is rich in native pottery artifacts, as well as beads, stone implements, stone carvings, graves, etc. The artifacts are now on display at multiple museums.

== Government ==
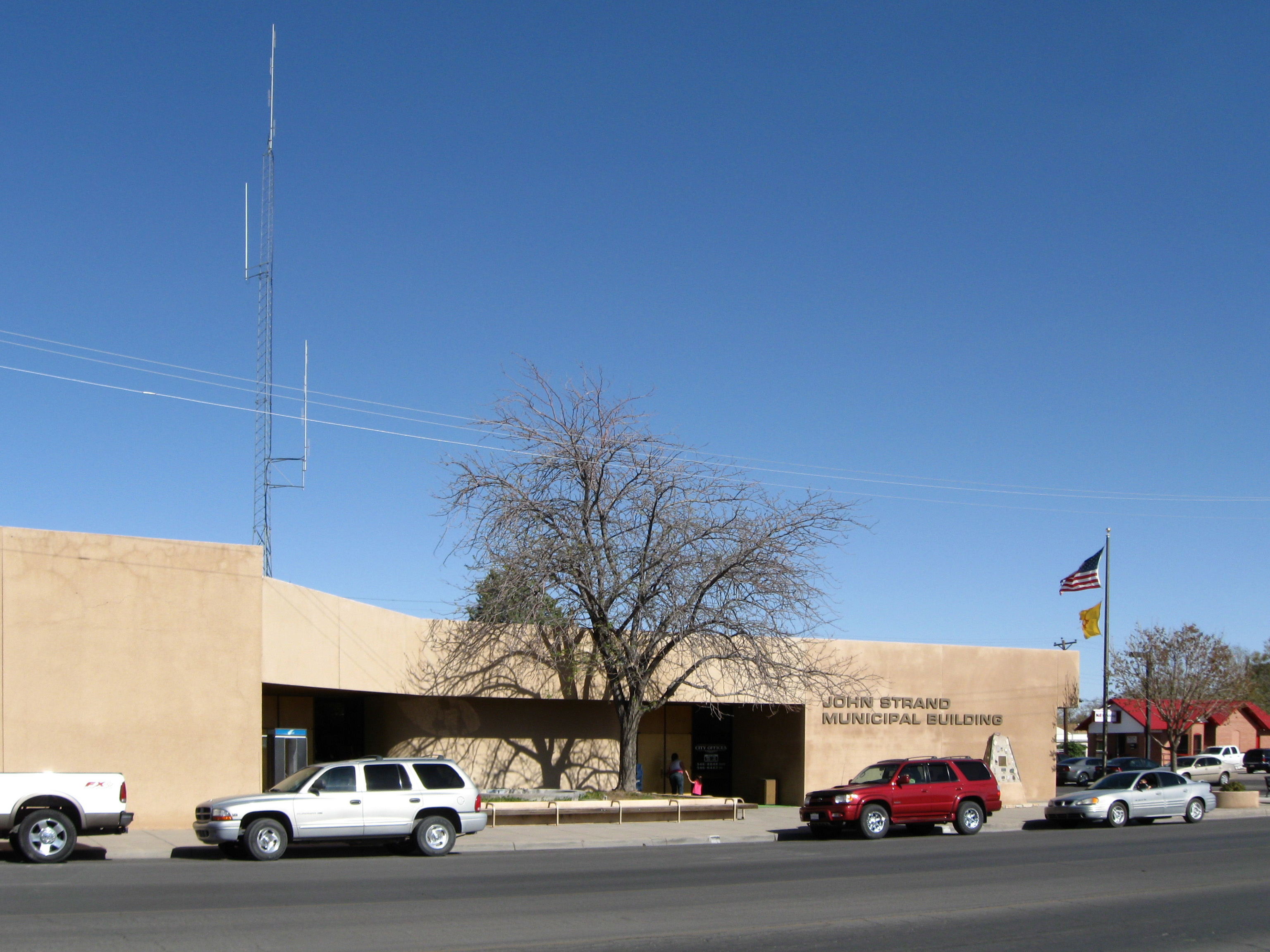
Deming City Hall

The city of Deming is governed by four elected council members and a Mayor. The mayor is elected by popular vote rather than by the council. All officers serve four-year terms.

On Nov. 7, 2023, Michele "Micki" Shillito was elected mayor, and became the first woman to hold the office on Jan. 1, 2024. She succeeded Benny L. Jasso, who served as mayor from 2014 through 2023.

The city council consists of the following representatives from four districts:

- District 1 - Julian Monjaras
- District 2 - Irma Rodriquez
- District 3 - Joe F. Milo
- District 4 - Stephen Westenhofer

== Geography ==
Deming is north of the center of Luna County in the Basin and Range Province of North America. Interstate 10 runs through the north side of the city, leading east 60 miles (97 km) to Las Cruces and west the same distance to Lordsburg. U.S. Route 180 leads northwest from Deming 52 miles (84 km) to Silver City, while State Road 26 leads northeast 48 miles (77 km) to Hatch. State Road 11 leads south 32 miles (51 km) to Columbus and an additional 3 miles (5 km) to the Mexico–United States border at Puerto Palomas.

According to the United States Census Bureau, Deming has a total area of 16.7 square miles (43.3 km^{2}), all land. The city is surrounded by land that appears flat, with wide rubble aprons around the nearby mountains and imperceptible grades in various directions.

The Mimbres River floods the Deming area once a decade or so, in periods of unusually heavy rainfall in the Cookes Range and Black Range to the north.

Deming and its surrounding area is underlain by an aquifer of good-quality water. The aquifer is slowly recharged primarily by water from the mountains to the north. The water usually has a high sulfur content.

== Climate ==
Deming is located within the Upper Chihuahuan Desert climate zone. The climate is dry, hot, and breezy. Summer temperatures often exceed 100 °F (38 °C), but the altitude (4,300 feet (1,300 m)) and dry air sometimes make summer days more comfortable than one would expect given the high temperature.

Most precipitation occurs as thunderstorms and showers during the July–September monsoon period. Minor flooding sometimes occurs over large areas of flat ground. There are periods lasting from five to twenty years of relatively wet or dry years. Springtime is often windy, and dust storms can be severe, occasionally lasting for days. Snow is not likely to fall in winter, but usually melts in a day or two if so. Temperatures in winter are sometimes below freezing at night, but winter days are generally mild and sunny.

Climate data for Deming, New Mexico, 1991–2020 normals, extremes 1961–present
Month	Jan	Feb	Mar	Apr	May	Jun	Jul	Aug	Sep	Oct	Nov	Dec	Year
Record high °F (°C)	80 (27)	82 (28)	88 (31)	94 (34)	104 (40)	108 (42)	109 (43)	108 (42)	103 (39)	95 (35)	84 (29)	77 (25)	109 (43)
Mean maximum °F (°C)	69.4 (20.8)	75.9 (24.4)	83.2 (28.4)	88.3 (31.3)	97.4 (36.3)	104.6 (40.3)	103.9 (39.9)	100.5 (38.1)	96.6 (35.9)	89.4 (31.9)	79.0 (26.1)	70.7 (21.5)	105.8 (41.0)
Mean daily maximum °F (°C)	58.3 (14.6)	63.9 (17.7)	71.8 (22.1)	79.9 (26.6)	88.0 (31.1)	96.7 (35.9)	96.2 (35.7)	93.6 (34.2)	88.7 (31.5)	79.6 (26.4)	67.1 (19.5)	57.4 (14.1)	78.4 (25.8)
Daily mean °F (°C)	43.1 (6.2)	47.5 (8.6)	54.0 (12.2)	61.2 (16.2)	69.2 (20.7)	78.2 (25.7)	80.9 (27.2)	79.0 (26.1)	73.5 (23.1)	62.8 (17.1)	50.7 (10.4)	42.7 (5.9)	61.9 (16.6)
Mean daily minimum °F (°C)	27.8 (−2.3)	31.1 (−0.5)	36.2 (2.3)	42.5 (5.8)	50.3 (10.2)	59.8 (15.4)	65.7 (18.7)	64.3 (17.9)	58.2 (14.6)	45.9 (7.7)	34.2 (1.2)	28.0 (−2.2)	45.3 (7.4)
Mean minimum °F (°C)	15.3 (−9.3)	18.2 (−7.7)	24.0 (−4.4)	31.1 (−0.5)	39.4 (4.1)	51.3 (10.7)	60.4 (15.8)	58.9 (14.9)	48.4 (9.1)	33.6 (0.9)	20.6 (−6.3)	13.9 (−10.1)	11.5 (−11.4)
Record low °F (°C)	−12 (−24)	−1 (−18)	10 (−12)	23 (−5)	26 (−3)	40 (4)	52 (11)	52 (11)	38 (3)	22 (−6)	9 (−13)	2 (−17)	−12 (−24)
Average precipitation inches (mm)	0.60 (15)	0.49 (12)	0.27 (6.9)	0.27 (6.9)	0.24 (6.1)	0.36 (9.1)	1.86 (47)	1.53 (39)	0.93 (24)	0.77 (20)	0.66 (17)	0.79 (20)	8.77 (223)
Average snowfall inches (cm)	0.5 (1.3)	0.1 (0.25)	0.0 (0.0)	0.0 (0.0)	0.0 (0.0)	0.0 (0.0)	0.0 (0.0)	0.0 (0.0)	0.0 (0.0)	0.0 (0.0)	0.0 (0.0)	0.4 (1.0)	1.0 (2.5)
Average precipitation days (≥ 0.01 in)	4.2	4.3	2.6	1.5	2.0	3.3	8.6	8.9	4.4	4.5	2.8	4.5	51.6
Average snowy days (≥ 0.1 in)	0.5	0.1	0.0	0.0	0.0	0.0	0.0	0.0	0.0	0.0	0.0	0.3	0.9
Source 1: NOAA
Source 2: National Weather Service

== Demographics ==
Historical population
Census	Pop.	Note	%±
1910	1,864		—
1920	3,212		72.3%
1930	3,377		5.1%
1940	3,608		6.8%
1950	5,672		57.2%
1960	5,764		1.6%
1970	8,343		44.7%
1980	9,964		19.4%
1990	10,970		10.1%
2000	14,116		28.7%
2010	14,855		5.2%
2020	14,758		−0.7%
U.S. Decennial Census

=== 2020 census ===
As of the 2020 census, Deming had a population of 14,758. The median age was 37.8 years. 26.4% of residents were under the age of 18 and 20.4% of residents were 65 years of age or older. For every 100 females there were 95.3 males, and for every 100 females age 18 and over there were 91.6 males age 18 and over.

97.4% of residents lived in urban areas, while 2.6% lived in rural areas.

There were 5,767 households in Deming, of which 32.4% had children under the age of 18 living in them. Of all households, 38.0% were married-couple households, 21.0% were households with a male householder and no spouse or partner present, and 33.9% were households with a female householder and no spouse or partner present. About 32.5% of all households were made up of individuals and 17.3% had someone living alone who was 65 years of age or older.

There were 6,595 housing units, of which 12.6% were vacant. The homeowner vacancy rate was 3.2% and the rental vacancy rate was 9.3%.

Racial composition as of the 2020 census
Race	Number	Percent
White	7,136	48.4%
Black or African American	216	1.5%
American Indian and Alaska Native	198	1.3%
Asian	127	0.9%
Native Hawaiian and Other Pacific Islander	12	0.1%
Some other race	3,225	21.9%
Two or more races	3,844	26.0%
Hispanic or Latino (of any race)	10,618	71.9%

=== 2000 census ===
As of the census of 2000, there were 14,116 people, 5,267 households, and 3,628 families residing in the city. The population density was 1,512.0 inhabitants per square mile (583.8/km^{2}). There were 6,192 housing units at an average density of 663.2 per square mile (256.1/km^{2}). The racial makeup of the city was 66.96% White, 1.37% Native American, 1.23% African American, 0.48% Asian, 0.01% Pacific Islander, 24.19% from other races, and 3.07% from two or more races. 64.58% of the population were Hispanic or Latino of any race. There were 5,267 households, out of which 34.9% had children under the age of 18 living with them, 49.0% were married couples living together, 15.5% had a female householder with no husband present, and 31.1% were non-families. 27.8% of all households were made up of individuals, and 15.7% had someone living alone who was 65 years of age or older. The average household size was 2.63 and the average family size was 3.23.

In the city, the population was: 30.9% under the age of 18, 8.2% from 18 to 24, 23.1% from 25 to 44, 19.3% from 45 to 64, and 18.6% who were 65 years of age or older. The median age was 35 years. For every 100 females, there were 89.7 males. For every 100 females age 18 and over, there were 85.9 males.

The median income for a household in the city was $20,081, and the median income for a family was $23,030. Males had a median income of $25,379 versus $16,462 for females. The per capita income for the city was $10,943. About 28.5% of families and 32.9% of the population were below the poverty line, including 47.4% of those under age 18 and 16.6% of those age 65 or over.

== Economy ==
Deming's economy is based on transportation, real estate, agriculture, energy, retirement, tourism, and the United States Department of Homeland Security. United States Border Patrol vehicles comprise a large fraction of Deming area road traffic.

Deming is the only major stop on Interstate 10 between Lordsburg, 60 miles (97 km) west, and Las Cruces, 60 miles (97 km) east. Deming is also the closest major town to Silver City, 50 miles (80 km) north, and it provides access to the state of Chihuahua, Mexico, via the village of Columbus, 30 miles (48 km) to the south. Deming also sits astride one of the major railroad lines linking the East Coast with the West Coast, via the Southern Route.

In 2006, the city's role in American homeland security expanded. Deming's industrial park became the home of a Border Patrol training center, a 10-acre (4.0 ha) forward operating base named Border Wolf that supported Operation Jump Start. These temporary buildings at the airport have since been disassembled and removed.

== In popular culture ==
=== Literature ===
- In Cormac McCarthy's second Border Trilogy novel, The Crossing, Billy Parham heads for Deming after returning to the U.S. from his second trip to Mexico.

=== Movies and television ===
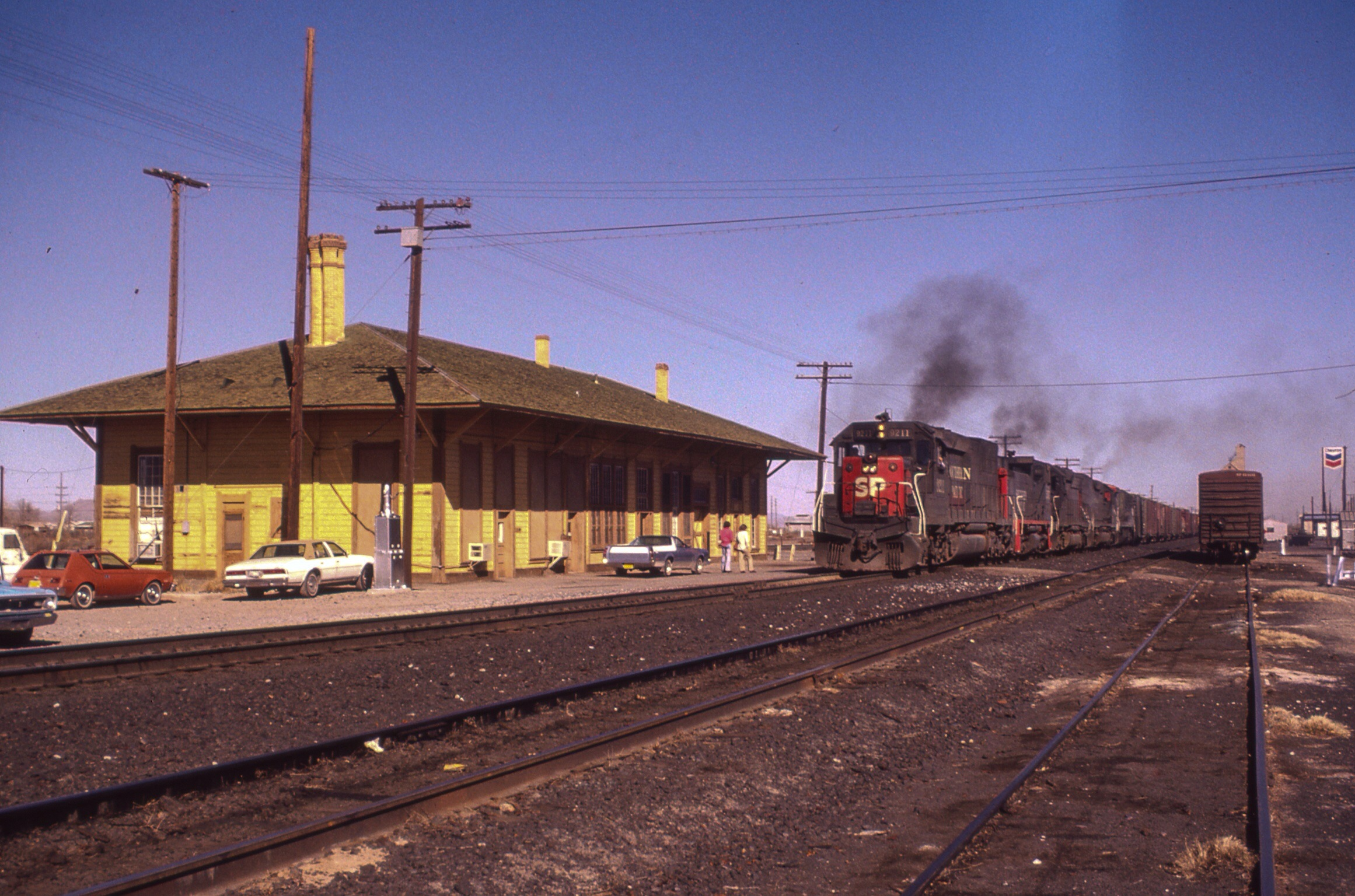
The old Deming train depot in 1983

Since 1953, several motion pictures have been filmed in Deming:

- Indiana Jones and the Kingdom of the Crystal Skull
- Gas Food Lodging
- The Themyscira scenes in Batman v Superman: Dawn of Justice
- The French-American movie Two Men in Town (a remake of the 1973 French film, Deux Hommes Dans La Ville starring Alain Delon); filmed in Deming and other locations in Luna County
- Creed II: Rocky Balboa and Donnie Creed (Sylvester Stallone and Michael B. Jordan) hold their training camp in the desert of Deming.

== Transportation ==
Airports

- Deming Municipal Airport, formerly Deming Army Air Field, is now private and charter.
- Grant County Airport (New Mexico),closest airport to Deming, is about 35 miles away from historical downtown. Offers flights to Phoenix Sky Harbor and Albuquerque Sunport
- El Paso International Airport, public airport with scheduled passenger flights, 108 mi (174 km) southeast of Deming.

Major highways

- I-10
- I-10 BL
- US 180
- NM 11

Railroads

- Freight service is provided by Union Pacific and the Southwestern Railroad.
- Amtrak's Sunset Limited and Texas Eagle routes stop at Deming Train Station.

Bus Services

- Corre Caminos, Operates a local modified fixed route within Deming, running Monday through Friday. Schedule & Stops: Runs hourly from 9:00 AM to 3:29 PM, stopping at key locations like the Bus Terminal, courthouse, library, and local medical facilities.

== Attractions ==
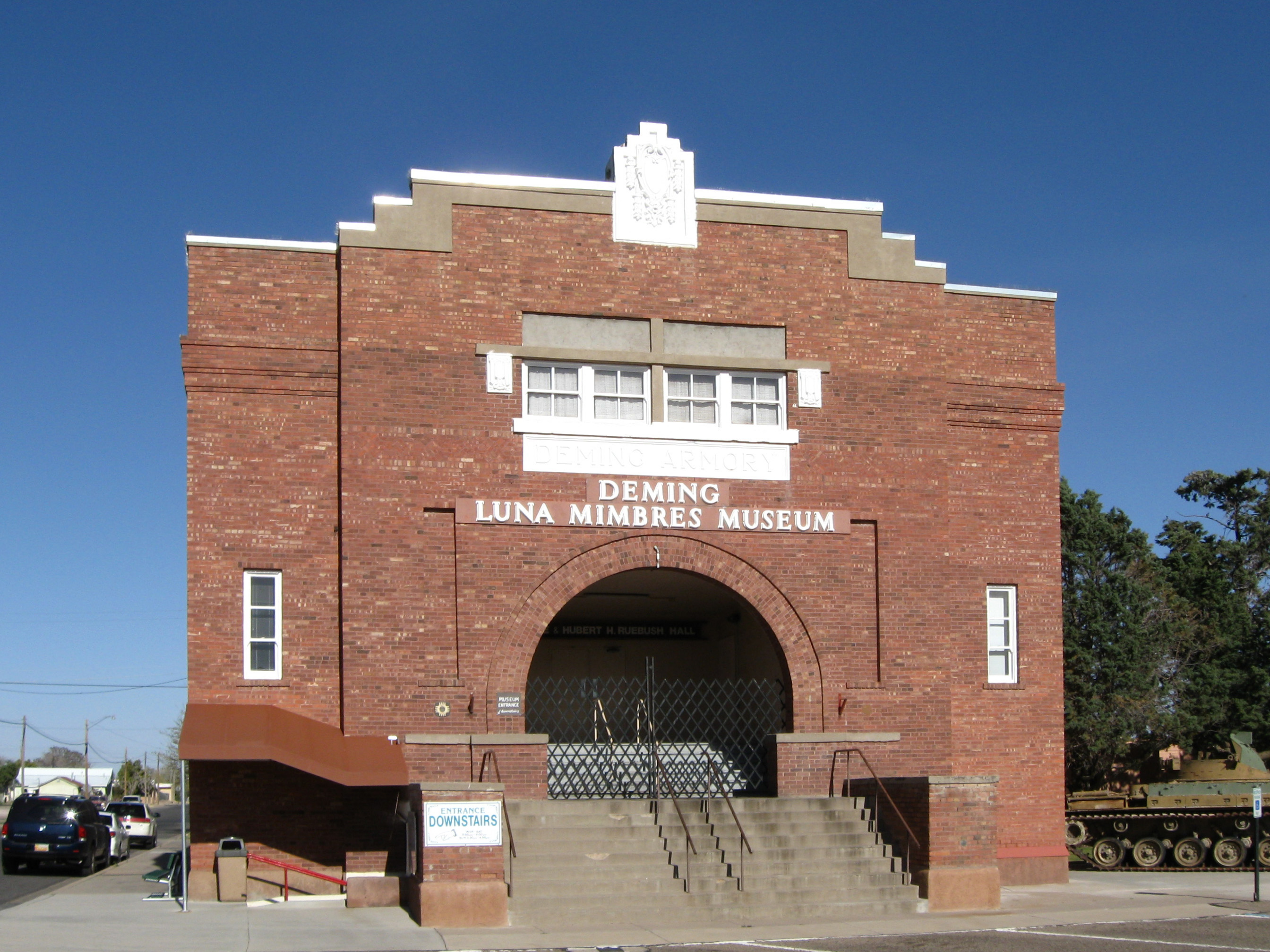
Deming Luna Mimbres Museum

The Deming Luna Mimbres museum, housed in the historic Deming Armory (1916) and Customs House, features an important collection of Mimbres Indian painted pottery, historic period-furnished rooms in the Seaman Fields House, an antique auto collection, a restored Harvey House restaurant, a doll collection, and a geological section.

The Great American Duck Race is held every year on the third weekend of August. It features wet and dry duck race tracks, a hot air balloon show, a Tournament of Ducks Parade, a carnival, and a variety of vendors setting up their wares in the Courthouse Square and surrounding property.

Deming has two wineries. St. Clair Winery is New Mexico's largest winery. The Luna Rossa Winery is a local estate winery that produces all of its wines with varieties grown on their own vineyards.

Deming has one of the only county ran family entertainment centers in the USA. Starmax, offers bowling, an arcade a full bar/club, Movie theater, mini golf. The facility also extends outside offering outdoor activities like a basketball court, pickleball court, batting cage and a large skatepark.

== Public Spaces/ State Parks ==
Public Spaces:

• Voiers "Pit" Park: is a popular community recreation area transformed from a former highway construction gravel pit by the City of Deming. The land was mined during the construction of Interstate 10 before the city redesigned it into a modern public green space. The site features open views, shaded areas, and a five-acre water feature known as Trees Lake.

• Trees Lake Fishing: The 5-acre lake participates in the New Mexico Department of Game and Fish stocking program, offering catches like largemouth bass, bluegill, perch, and catfish.

• Amphitheater & Pavilion: Features a 1,000-seat outdoor amphitheater and a 6,100-square-foot covered pavilion available to rent for weddings, family reunions, and community gatherings.

State Parks:

• City of Rocks State Park: with volcanic rock formations,

• Rockhound State Park, offering mineral and rock collecting.

== Education ==
Deming currently have 4 active high schools. Students attend schools in the Deming Public Schools. There is also 1 university that offers specialized programs.

High Schools:

- Deming High School (9–12)
- Early College High School (9–12)
- Mimbres Valley High School (9-12)

Charter schools:

- Deming Cesar Chavez Charter High School (9–12)

Higher Education:

- Western New Mexico University Deming

The WNMU Deming campus provides accessible higher education, adult basic education, and allied health programs to rural and multicultural communities in Luna Count. It supports the university's School of Nursing and allied heath certificate programs.

== High School Athletics ==
The Deming Wildcats boys basketball team has won 5 state championships in its history. 4 of their championships were under legendary coach Frank Dooley. Dooley led the Wildcats to four New Mexico Class 3A state titles (1971, 1972, 1974, and 1976). Deming Wildcats boys basketball team finished as the runner-up in the 2004 New Mexico Class 4A State Championship, losing a close 64–60 game to the Capital High School Jaguars on March 13, 2004, at The Pit in Albuquerque. Deming would find redemption as they returned to the state championship game in 2005. They beat Capital High School 71-67 to secure the 2005 state championship.

The Deming Wildcats girls basketball team were 2004 state runner-ups losing to Capital High School in the championship.

== Notable people ==
- Wade Blasingame, MLB pitcher
- Nacio Herb Brown, songwriter
- Max Crook, the songwriter who co-wrote Del Shannon's hit song "Runaway"
- Craig Noel, founding director of the Old Globe Theatre in San Diego, California
- Sarah Bedichek Pipkin, geneticist
- Frank Ray, country music singer
