= Plains Apache language =

North American aboriginal language

Plains Apache
- Kiowa Apache
- Native to: United States
- Region: Caddo County, Oklahoma
- Ethnicity: Plains Apache
- Extinct: 2008, with the death of Alfred Chalepah Jr.
- Language family: Na-Dene: Athabaskan; Southern Athabaskan; Plains Apache

Language codes
- ISO 639-3: apk
- Glottolog: kiow1264
- ELP: Kiowa Apache
- Historical distribution of Southern Athabaskan languages. Plains Apache (labeled Kiowa Apache) is located in northwestern Oklahoma.

The Plains Apache language is a Southern Athabaskan language formerly spoken by the Plains Apache, organized as the Apache Tribe of Oklahoma, living primarily around Anadarko in southwest Oklahoma. The language is extinct as of 2008, when Alfred Chalepah, Jr., the last native speaker, died.

Plains Apache is the most divergent member of the Southern Athabaskan languages, a family which also includes Navajo, Chiricahua Apache, Mescalero Apache, Lipan Apache, Western Apache, and Jicarilla Apache. As a member of the broader Athabaskan family, it has an extremely complex system of verbal morphology, often enabling entire sentences to be constructed with only a verb.

== Phonology ==
This article follows the orthography of Bittle (1963); where this differs from the IPA, IPA is given between slashes.

=== Consonants ===
Plains Apache has a large consonant inventory resembling that of its close relatives Navajo and Western Apache.

		Bilabial	Alveolar			Post- alveolar	Velar	Glottal
		Bilabial	plain	lateral	fricated	Post- alveolar	Velar	Glottal
Plosive	tenuis	p ⟨b⟩	t ⟨d⟩	tɬ ⟨dl⟩	ts ⟨dz⟩	tʃ ⟨dž⟩	k ⟨g⟩	ʔ
Plosive	aspirated			tɬʰ ⟨tł⟩	tsʰ ⟨ts⟩	tʃʰ ⟨tš⟩	kʰ ⟨k⟩	ʔ
Plosive	glottalized		tʼ	tɬʼ ⟨tłʼ⟩	tsʼ	tʃʼ ⟨tšʼ⟩	kʼ	ʔ
Plosive	prenasalised		ⁿd					
Fricative	voiceless			ɬ ⟨ł⟩	s	ʃ ⟨š⟩	x	h
Fricative	voiced				z	ʒ ⟨ž⟩	ɣ	
Sonorant		m	n	l		j ⟨y⟩		

The phoneme /ⁿd/ is only found in prefixes and does not occur before /o/. /h/ is in free variation with /x/ preceding /a/ and also does not occur before /o/. The fricated alveolar and postalveolar series are tend to be realized as slightly retroflex preceding /i/ and /e/, though these variants are in free variation with the unretroflexed realizations. The plain alveolar and velar series are slightly fronted preceding /i/ and /e/, and slightly backed and rounded preceding /o/.

=== Vowels ===
Plains Apache distinguishes four vowel qualities, much like the other Southern Athabaskan languages.

	Front	Back
High	i	o
Mid	ɛ ⟨e⟩	o
Low	a	

Additionally, all vowels may be either short or long and nasal or oral. Length is indicated in the orthography by writing the vowel twice (e.g. kóó, 'water'); nasalization is indicated with an ogonek (e.g. nǫ̀ǫ̀, 'earth'). When long, the realization of /i/ tends to be closer to [i], and when short, closer to [ɪ]. An analogous alternation is true of /o/ [u~o], although this variation is more free, and is lexicalized by some speakers in certain words.

=== Syllable Structure ===
The Plains Apache syllable is maximally CCV:C, e.g. stłèèh 'pants', though initial clusters are rare and must co-occur with a long vowel, making most syllables (C)V(:)(C), e.g. xòòš 'cactus' and séé 'dust'. All consonants may appear in the syllable onset, although /l/ and a null onset are not permitted word-initially; only /d, g, ʔ, s, z, ʃ, ʒ, h, l/ and /ɬ/ may appear in the syllable coda, whether word-final or not.

=== Tone ===
Plains Apache has a register tone system with two levels, low and high. Low is written with a grave accent (e.g. bìs, 'bank'), and high is written with an acute accent (e.g. šéł, 'kindness'). Syllables with short vowels bear a single toneme, but those with long vowels have one toneme for each mora of the vowel, making for a total of four contours:

- high-high, tʼǫ́ǫ́š, 'bark'
- high-low, béè-lą̀ą̀ʔ, 'point'
- low-high, gòóʔ, 'snake'
- low-low, gààd, 'spread of cedars'

== Morphology ==
=== Nouns ===
Almost every noun in Plains Apache can optionally take a pronominal prefix to indicate its possessor. These prefixes are as follows (some of the prefixes have multiple forms in free variation; in these cases, the more common variant is listed first).

		Singular	Plural
1st person		ší-	dàxí- ~ dá-
2nd person		dí-	dàxí- ~ dá-
3rd person		bí- ~ mí-	
3rd person	indefinite	ʔí-	
4th person		góó- ~ gó-	

Some of these forms require further explanation. The indefinite third person may be used when the possessor is unknown, and is similar in meaning to 'someone's' (e.g. ʔí-bą̀ą̀s, 'a hoop owned by some unknown person'). The fourth person is reserved for possessors who are deemed to be in some way remote from the speaker, usually socially; compare bí-bą̀ą̀s, which would refer to a hoop belonging to someone who the speaker is familiar with and interacts with frequently and informally, and góó-bą̀ą̀s, used for someone who the speaker has a purely formal relationship with and does not know well.

The noun bases to which these prefixes can be added are of one of three classes: primary, compound, and nominalized. Primary noun bases are mostly monosyllabic stems such as t'èèš, 'charcoal', though a few of them seem to consist of an unidentified prefix and a stem (e.g. dèè-éh, 'antelope'), and some others are simply unanalyzable polysyllables, perhaps originally onomatopoeic (e.g. ʔą̀ą̀ʔą̀ʔ, 'magpie'). Many of the stem nouns have different forms depending on their morphological context, with an absolute form when unpossessed, an inflected form when possessed, and a combining form in compounds or nominalized phrases. The formation of these is generally irregular, although certain patterns do exist, such as initial x, s, and ł becoming ɣ, z, and l when inflected (e.g. sàà > bí-zàà, 'his language') and a final V:h becoming Vʔ (e.g. t'ààh > bí-t'áʔ, 'his feather').

Some stem nouns, especially those referring to body parts, are inalienably possessed, i.e. they cannot occur without a possessor prefix (e.g. bí-dààh, 'his lips', but not *dààh). In these cases the indefinite prefix must be used if one wishes to talk about the object without specifying the possessor (ʔí-dààh, 'lips'). In order to indicate alienable possession of these nouns, an additional possessor prefix can be attached before the indefinite prefix, yielding forms like bí-ʔí-k'àʔ, 'his fat (which comes from the body of something or someone else, but is now in his possession)' contrasting with bí-k'àʔ, 'his fat (which is a part of his own body)'. Some of these nouns may change their meaning when preceded by ʔí-, such as ʔí-bèʔ, 'milk' versus bí-bèʔ, 'her breast'. Lastly, some can only take the indefinite prefix, effectively turning them into regular alienably possessed nouns starting with ʔí- (e.g. ʔí-dààh, 'enemy', but bí-ʔí-dààh, 'his enemy', not *bí-dààh).

The second kind of noun bases are compounds, which are formed from two noun stems and sometimes an enclitic of obscure meaning (e.g. bí-déé-kòò, 'his tears', from déé, combining form of 'eye', and kòò, combining form of 'water'). The third kind of noun bases are nominalized verbs or phrases, which may or may not include some kind of a relative enclitic. Examples include dáł-ts'ààh, 'zebra, tiger', from the identical verb meaning 'marks are on it', and hà-ts'í-ɣą̀ą̀s-é, 'badger', from the verb hà-ts'í-ɣą̀ą̀s, 'he scratches out' plus the relative enclitic -é 'he who'.

=== Verbs ===
Like those of most other Athabaskan languages, Plains Apache verbs are highly morphologically complex, exhibiting polypersonal agreement, rich aspect marking, and the characteristic Athabaskan classifier system (a set of four mandatory valence-changing prefixes found throughout the family). Bittle (1963) identifies 14 positions in the verb template, divided into the verbal base (which defines the lexical meaning of the verb) and paradigmatic prefixes (which inflect the verb for person, number, tense, aspect, mood, and voice). The following verb template table is reproduced from Bittle:

Position	Verbal base		Paradigmatic prefixes
Position	Theme	Adverbial prefixes	Paradigmatic prefixes
1			Indirect object
2		Postposition	
3		Adverbial prefixes	
4	Theme prefix		
5			Iterative mode
6			Number prefix
7			Direct object
8			Deictic prefixes
9		Adverbial prefixes	
10			Tense prefix
11			Modal prefixes
12			Subject pronoun
13			Classifier
14	Stem		

However, a verb in Plains Apache never has an affix in each position. A typical verb might be inflected as follows:

ši- a- yi- dí- ∅- ∅- ʔą̀ą̀
1SG.OBJ- PP- 3OBJ- PFV- 3SBJ- CLF- give
'He gives it to me'

In this case, ši- is the indirect object prefix in slot 1, -a- is the postposition in slot 2, -yi- is the direct object prefix in slot 7, -dí- is the modal prefix in slot 11, slots 12 and 13 are occupied by zero morphemes, and ʔą̀ą̀ is the stem in slot 14. All other slots are empty.

The above example displays the zero classifier. Following is an example of a fully inflected verb with the ł- classifier prefix:

ši- go- ∅- ∅- ł- bèèš
1SG.OBJ- NUM- IPFV- 3SBJ- CLF- boil
'They two are boiling me'

== Syntax ==
Like other Southern Athabaskan languages, Plains Apache has strongly head-final tendencies, with a predominant word order of subject-object-verb and postpositions rather than prepositions. This is illustrated in the following example sentences:

dèènáá kóó ʔí- ł- bééš
man water INDEF- CLF- boil
'The man boils water'

séé mi- džǫ́ʔ- dą́ʔ dà- yi- ɣí- ø- ø- nííł
dirt 3SG- back- PP ADV- 3OBJ- PROG- 3SBJ- CLF- throw
'He threw dirt on his back'

However, due to the morphological complexity of Plains Apache verb inflection, it is often possible for a sentence to consist of a single verb, e.g.

da- di- ∅- į̀į̀d- ∅- mą̀ą̀s
NUM- THM- IPFV- 1DUPL.SBJ- CLF- {go to war}
'Each one of us is starting off to war'

Noun phrases always contain only a noun, as Plains Apache has no determiners or adjectives; the equivalent of adjectival modification is achieved by the use of compound and nominalized nouns discussed above.

== See also ==
- Apache
- Southern Athabaskan languages
- Kiowa
