= Western Apache language =

Southern Athabaskan language

Western Apache
- Ndee biyáti' / Nṉee biyáti'
- Native to: Mexico and United States
- Region: Sonora, Chihuahua and south-east Arizona
- Ethnicity: Western Apache
- Native speakers: 13,445, 65% of population (2013)
- Language family: Na-Dene: Athabaskan–Eyak; Athabaskan; Southern; Southwestern; Western; Western Apache
- Writing system: Latin

Official status
- Official language in: Mexico
- Recognised minority language in: San Carlos Apache Nation, Arizona
- Regulated by: Instituto Nacional de Lenguas Indígenas

Language codes
- ISO 639-3: apw
- Glottolog: west2615
- ELP: Western Apache
- Western Apache is classified as Definitely Endangered by the UNESCO Atlas of the World's Languages in Danger.

The Western Apache language is a Southern Athabaskan language spoken among the 14,000 Western Apache in Mexico in the states of Sonora and Chihuahua and in east-central Arizona. There are approximately 6,000 speakers living on the San Carlos Reservation and 7,000 living on the Fort Apache Reservation. In Mexico, they mainly live in Hermosillo, Sonora, and other native communities in Chihuahua.

== Dialects ==
Goodwin (1938) claims that Western Apache can be divided into five dialect groupings:

- Cibecue
- Northern Tonto
- Southern Tonto
- San Carlos
- White Mountain

Other researchers do not find any linguistic evidence for five groups but rather three main varieties with several subgroupings:

- San Carlos
- White Mountain
- Tonto (also known as Dilzhe'e)

Western Apache is most closely related to other Southern Athabaskan languages like Navajo, Chiricahua Apache, Mescalero Apache, Lipan Apache, Plains Apache, and Jicarilla Apache.

In 2011, the San Carlos Apache Tribe's Language Preservation Program in Peridot, Arizona, began its outreach to the "14,000 tribal members residing within the districts of Bylas, Gilson Wash, Peridot and Seven Mile Wash", only 20% of whom still speak the language fluently.

== Usage ==
The geographic locations of events are crucial components to any Western Apache story or narrative. All Western Apache narratives are spatially anchored to points upon the land, with precise depictions of specific locations, which is characteristic of many Native American languages. Basso called the practice of focusing on places in the language "speaking with names".

According to Basso, the Western Apache practice of "speaking with names" expresses functional range and versatility. Basso claims that "a description of a place may be understood to accomplish all of the following actions:

1. produce a mental image of a particular geographical location;
2. evoke prior texts, such as historical tales and sagas;
3. affirm the value and validity of traditional moral precepts (i.e., ancestral wisdom);
4. display tactful and courteous attention to aspects of both positive and negative face;
5. convey sentiments of charitable concern and personal support;
6. offer practical advice for dealing with disturbing personal circumstances (i.e., apply ancestral wisdom);
7. transform distressing thoughts caused by excessive worry into more agreeable ones marked by optimism and hopefulness;
8. heal wounded spirits."

Basso also claims the practice of "speaking with names" can occur only between those with shared "knowledge of the same traditional narratives". He notes that though many elders in Western Apache communities, such as Cibecue, share this knowledge, younger generations of Western Apache "are ignorant of both placenames and traditional narratives in increasing numbers", which makes engaging in the practice of "speaking with names" incredibly difficult.

== Revitalization efforts ==
Western Apache is an endangered language, and there are efforts to increase the number of speakers. One method of teaching Western Apache is the Total Physical Response (TPR) Method, which focuses, especially in early instruction, on commands. That method is best for teaching the straightforward aspects of grammar, such as yes-and-no questions, and can be enhanced with further grammatical exercises.

== Place names ==
Many Western Apache place names that are currently in use are believed to be creations of Apache ancestors. Keith Basso, a prominent Western Apache linguist, writes that the ancestors frequently traveled for food, and the need to remember specific places was "facilitated by the invention of hundreds of descriptive placenames that were intended to depict their referents in close and exact detail." Basso also writes that place names provide descriptions of specific locations and also "positions for viewing these locations". The place names are a fundamental aspect of Western Apache communication, allowing for what Basso describes as an appropriation of "mythic significance" for "specialized social ends" via the practice of "speaking with names".

Place names can be descriptive or commemorative or a means of identifying clans. Social groups will often use place names as a way to communicate. For example, they use place names to explain what happened to them: If there is a story linked to the location, they can relate to it or use it as a warning. This use of place names is known in the culture as "shooting with stories", as they shoot one another with stories like arrows of information.

== Phonology ==
=== Consonants ===
There are 31 consonants in Western Apache:

| | | Bilabial | Alveolar | | | Palatal | Velar | Glottal |
| | | Bilabial | plain | sibilant | lateral | Palatal | Velar | Glottal |
|---|---|---|---|---|---|---|---|---|
| Nasal | | m | n | | | | | |
| Stop | voiced | | (ⁿd/d) | | | | | |
| Stop | voiceless | p | t | ts | tɬ | tʃ | k | ʔ |
| Stop | aspirated | | tʰ | tsʰ | tɬʰ | tʃʰ | kʰ | |
| Stop | ejective | | tʼ | tsʼ | tɬʼ | tʃʼ | kʼ | |
| Fricative | voiceless | | | s | ɬ | ʃ | x | h |
| Fricative | voiced | | | z | | ʒ | ɣ | |
| Approximant | | | | | l | j | w | |

Stops are contrasted as aspirated, unaspirated and ejective, and occur in three places of articulation (bilabial, alveolar, and velar), although the bilabial stops are restricted in use. The voiceless unaspirated alveolars are realized as taps intervocalically but not stem-initially. There are no ejective bilabials, and aspirated bilabials (namely /pʰ/) are rare, mainly occurring in loanwords.

=== Vowels ===
There are 16 vowels in Western Apache:

| | | Front | | Central | | Back | |
| | | short | long | short | long | short | long |
|---|---|---|---|---|---|---|---|
| Close | oral | ɪ | iː | | | | |
| Close | nasal | ɪ̃ | ĩː | | | | |
| Open-mid | oral | ɛ | ɛː | | | o | oː |
| Open-mid | nasal | ɛ̃ | ɛ̃ː | | | õ | õː |
| Open | oral | | | a | aː | | |
| Open | nasal | | | ã | ãː | | |

An acute accent /á/ represents a vowel with a high tone. Low-toned vowels are not marked.

Phonetic Semantic signs are divided into two sub-parts: a logographs (denoting only one word) and phraseographs (denoting one or more words).

== Writing system ==
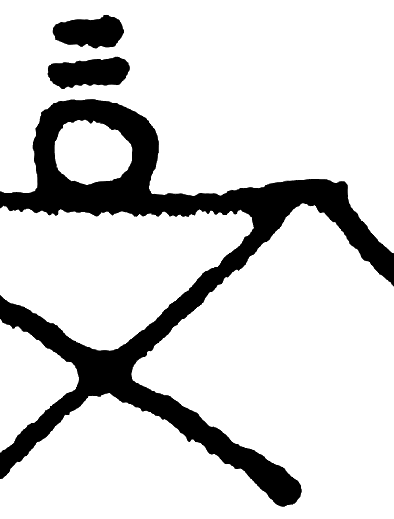
Partial image of one of the pictographs on the cover of Basso's Western Apache language and culture

The only writing system native to Western Apache is a system of symbols created in 1904 by Silas John Edwards to record 62 prayers that he believed came to him from heaven. A Silas John prayer-text is a set of graphic symbols written on buckskin or paper. The symbols are arranged in horizontal lines which are read from left to right in descending order. Symbols are separated by a space, and each symbol corresponds to a single line of prayer, which may consist of a word, a phrase, or one or more sentences. An interesting feature of this writing system is that it includes symbols for nonverbal actions as well as verbal speech.

Symbols can either be "compound" or "non-compound". Compound symbols consist of two symbols being combined in order to form a new symbol. Non-compound symbols are symbols that are not combination of two separate symbols. The "names" of non-compound symbols are the same as the line of text that the symbols elicit. Because of this, the linguistic referent of a non-compound symbol is always the same as the meaning of the element that forms it and can be learned in a single operation.

=== Alphabet and pronunciation ===
Western Apache uses a modified version of the Latin alphabet:

| Letter | | Example | | |
| orthography | IPA equivalent | orthography | IPA | meaning |
|---|---|---|---|---|
| ʼ | /ʔ/ | oʼiʼán | [oʔɪʔán] | hole |
| A | /a/ | acha | [atʃʰa] | ax |
| B | /p/ | bésh | [pɛ́ʃ] | knife |
| Ch | /tʃʰ/ | chizh | [tʃʰɪʒ] | wood |
| Chʼ | /tʃʼ/ | chʼah | [tʃʼax] | hat |
| D | /t/ | dǫ́ʼ | [tṍʔ] | fly |
| Dl | /tɬ/ | dlǫ́ʼ | [tɬṍʔ] | bird |
| Dz | /ts/ | dził | [tsɪɬ] | mountain |
| E | /ɛ/ | eʼilzaa | [ɛʔɪlzaː] | picture |
| G | /k/ | gaagé | [kaːkɛ́] | crow |
| Gh | /ɣ/ | ighál | [ɪɣál] | bells |
| H | /x/ | hashbidí | [xaʃpɪtɪ́] | quail |
| I | /ɪ/ | izee | [ɪzɛː] | medicine |
| J | /dʒ/ | jaasíláhá | [dʒaːsɪ́láxá] | earrings |
| K | /kʰ/ | kee | [kʰɛː] | shoe |
| Kʼ | /kʼ/ | kʼaa | [kʼaː] | bullets |
| L | /l/ | iloh | [ɪlox] | thread |
| Ł | /ɬ/ | łóg | [ɬók] | fish |
| M | /m/ | mbá | [mpá] | coyote |
| N | /n/ | nadą́ʼ | [natã́] | corn |
| O | /o/ | oyeeł | [ojɛːɬ] | carry |
| P | /pʰ/ | piishi | [pʰɪːʃɪ] | swallow |
| S | /s/ | silaada | [sɪlaːta] | soldier |
| Sh | /ʃ/ | shash | [ʃaʃ] | bear |
| T | /tʰ/ | tús | [tʰús] | jug |
| Tʼ | /tʼ/ | itʼoh | [ɪtʼox] | nest |
| Tł | /tɬʰ/ | tłád / ikʼah | [tɬʰát] / [ɪkʼax] | oil |
| Tłʼ | /tɬʼ/ | tłʼoh | [tɬʼox] | plants |
| Ts | /tsʰ/ | tséé | [tsʰɛ́ː] | rock |
| Tsʼ | /tsʼ/ | tsʼaał | [tsʼaːɬ] | cradleboard |
| U | /u/ | tú | [tʰú] | water |
| W | /w/ | iwoo | [ɪwoː] | teeth |
| Y | /j/ | yoo | [joː] | beads |
| Z | /z/ | zas | [zas] | snow |
| Zh | /ʒ/ | zhaali | [ʒaːlɪ] | money |
| aa | /aː/ | | | |
| ą | /ã/ | | | |
| á | /á/ | | | |
| ą́ | /ã́/ | | | |
| ąą | /ãː/ | | | |
| é | /ɛ́/ | | | |
| ę | /ɛ̃/ | | | |
| ę́ | /ɛ̃́/ | | | |
| ęę | /ɛ̃ː/ | | | |
| í | /ɪ́/ | | | |
| į | /ɪ̃/ | | | |
| į́ | /ɪ̃́/ | | | |
| įį | /ɪ̃ː/ | | | |
| ó | /ó/ | | | |
| ǫ | /õ/ | | | |
| ǫǫ | /õː/ | | | |
| ǫ́ | /ṍ/ | | | |
| ú | /ú/ | | | |

== Grammar ==
Western Apache uses a classificatory verb system comparable to that in both Jicarilla and Mescalero Apache. Basso gives this example: "the stems –tii and –'a are used in the phrases nato sentii and nato sen'a both of which may be translated broadly as "hand (me) the tobacco." The difference in meaning between the two verb forms is signaled by their stems:

- –tii refers to the handling of a single, elongated object (e.g., a cigarette)
- –'a refers to the handling of a single, compact object (e.g., a packet of cigarettes).

In short, the referent of the noun nato ("tobacco") is made more precise according to the stem with which it is coupled."

The use of classificatory verbs is similar to that of nouns: the speaker must select an expression that corresponds to the situation in the world he wishes to refer to. The speaker must place specific objects into categories and use the appropriate verb form in accordance with the particular category. Basso gives these examples of classifications for the Western Apache verb system:

=== Animal/Non-animal ===
There are two features on this dimension: "animal" and "non-animal".

- The former, designated by the symbol (a1) includes all vertebrates and insects.
- The latter, designated (a2), includes flora, liquids, minerals, and practically all items of material culture.

=== Enclosure ===
There are two features on this dimension.

- The first (b1) refers to the condition whereby the item or object being talked about is enclosed in a container.
- The second (b2) refers to the condition whereby it is not enclosed, i.e., not in a container.

=== State ===
There are three features on this dimension:

"solid" (c1), "plastic" (c2), and "liquid" (c3).

The second feature refers to moist, plastic substances such as mud, wet clay, etc., and might also have been defined as "neither solid nor liquid".

=== Number ===
There are three features on this dimension:

"one" (d1), "two" (d2), and "more than two" (d3).

=== Rigidity ===
There are two features on this dimension:

"rigid" (e1), and "non-rigid" (e2).

The Apache consider an object to be rigid (nkliz) if, when held at its edge or end, it does not bend.

=== Length ===
There are two features on this dimension:

- The first (f1), refers to the condition whereby the horizontal length of an object is at least three times greater than either its width of height.
- The second feature (f2) refers to the condition whereby the length of an object is less than three times its width or height.

=== Portability ===
There are two features on this dimension:

"portable" (g1) and "non-portable" (g2).

- The former refers to items light enough in weight to be easily carried by one person.
- The latter refers to items sufficiently heavy to require at least two people to carry them.

== Examples ==
- Hat' ii baa nadaa? – What are you doing?/What are you busy with?
- Shiyoo' baa nashaa. – I am doing my beading.
- Doo shaa nadaa da. – Don't bother me.
- Naa naghaa. – S/he is bothering you

== Bibliography ==
=== Language pedagogy ===
- Arizona State University & American Indian Language Development Institute. (1983). Nohwiyati' [Our language]. SIL.
- Bunney, Curtis. (1974). Nnee baa nadaagoni' [Apache stories]. San Carlos, AZ: Rice School District.
- Bunney, Curtis. (1974). Oshii bigonsh'aa. San Carlos, AZ: Rice School District.
- Bunney, Curtis. (n.d.). Apache Workbook l: Oshii bigonsh'aa. San Carlos, AZ: Rice School District.
- Bunney, Curtis. (n.d.). Nnee dii k'ehgo daagoląąni'. San Carlos, AZ: Rice School District.
- Bunney, Curtis. (n.d.). The Little Red Hen (and other stories): Chaghashe bi nagoni'e. San Carlos, AZ: Rice School District.
- Bunney, Curtis, and Crowder, Jack. (1972). Western Apache Series. San Carlos, AZ: Rice School District. [20 booklets].
- Crowder, Jack L. (1972). The cactus boy: Hosh nteelé ishkiin. San Carlos, AZ: Rice School District No. 20.
- Crowder, Jack L. (1972). Chagháshé táági [The three children]. San Carlos, AZ: Rice School District No. 20.
- Crowder, Jack L. (1972). Da'ónjii nadaagohilnéhé [We read we play]. San Carlos, AZ: Rice School District No. 20.
- Crowder, Jack L. (1972). Doo hant'é dalke' da. San Carlos, AZ: Rice School District No. 20.
- Crowder, Jack L. (1972). Gosh'ii: Shíí Mary nshlii: Gosh'ii. San Carlos, AZ: Rice School District No. 20.
- Crowder, Jack L. (1972). Haigo: Zas naláá. San Carlos, AZ: Rice School District No. 20.
- Crowder, Jack L. (1972). Idiists'ag, gosh'ii: [I hear, I see]. San Carlos, AZ: Rice School District No. 20.
- Crowder, Jack L. (1972). Kih nagodenk'áá: Kih diltli'. San Carlos, AZ: Rice School District No. 20.
- Crowder, Jack L. (1972). Mary hik'e tl'oh bilgo. San Carlos, AZ: Rice School District No. 20.
- Crowder, Jack L. (1972). Nnee kéhgo onltag bigonláa [Learn to count in Apache]. San Carlos, AZ: Rice School District No. 20.
- Crowder, Jack L. (1972). Shíí nnee nshlii. San Carlos, AZ: Rice School District No. 20.
- Crowder, Jack L. (1972). Shíígo shil nlt'éé. San Carlos, AZ: Rice School District No. 20.
- Crowder, Jack L. (1972). Shiyo' tséé dotl'izhi alzáa [Mary's peridot necklace]. San Carlos, AZ: Rice School District No. 20.
- Crowder, Jack L. (1972). Stephen hik'e na'inniihí [Stephen and the airplane]. San Carlos, AZ: Rice School District No. 20.
- Crowder, Jack L. (1972). Tahbiyú [Early morning]. San Carlos, AZ: Rice School District No. 20.
- Crowder, Jack L. (1972) Tl'oh tú yidlaa. San Carlos, AZ: Rice School District No. 20.
- Crowder, Jack L. (1972). Tulgayé ligayi: Tulagayé bijaa igodi [The white donkey]. San Carlos, AZ: Rice School District No. 20.
- Crowder, Jack L. (1972). The wild animals: Itsá. San Carlos, AZ: Rice School District No. 20.
- Crowder, Jack L. (1972). [Apache language readers]. San Carlos, AZ.
- Edgerton, Faye E.; & Hill, Faith. (1958). Primer, (Vols. 1–2). Glendale, AZ.
- Goode, Phillip. (1985). Apache language course and lesson plans for Globe High School: Grades 9–12. [Unpublished manuscript].
- Goode, Phillip. (1996). Total physical response sentences from Asher (1982) translated into San Carlos Apache, with commentary by Willem J. de Reuse. [Unpublished manuscript].
- Hunn, E. S. (n.d). Western Apache Language and Culture (Book). Ethnohistory, 38(4), 463.* Johnson, James B.; Lavender, Bonnie; Malone, Beverley; Bead, Christina; & Clawson, Curry. (n.d.). Yati' nakih [Two languages]: Kindergarten bi naltsoos choh [Kindergarten's big book]. Title VII Bilingual Education Program Kindergarten Curriculum Manual. Fort Apache, AZ: White Mountain Apache Tribe.
- Malone, Wesley; Malone, Beverly; & Quintero, Canyon Z. (1983). New keys to reading and writing Apache, (rev. ed.). Fort Apache, AZ: White Mountain Apache Culture Center.
- Nevins, T. J., & Eleanor Nevins, M. (2013). Speaking in the mirror of the other: Dialectics of intersubjectivity and temporality in Western Apache discourse. Language And Communication, 33292–306.
- Perry, Edgar. (1989). Apache picture dictionary. Fort Apache, AZ: White Mountain Apache Culture Center.
- Perry, Edgar; & Quintero, Canyon Z. (1972). Now try reading these. Fort Apache, AZ: Apache Culture Center.
- Quintero, Canyon Z. (1972). Keys to reading Apache. Fort Apache, AZ: White Mountain Apache Culture Center.
- de Reuse, Willem J. (2006). A practical grammar of the San Carlos Apache language. LINCOM Studies in Native American Linguistics 51. LINCOM. ISBN 3-89586-861-2.
- de Reuse, Willem J.; & Adley-SantaMaria, Bernadette. (1996). Ndee biyáti' bígoch'il'aah [Learning Apache]: An introductory textbook in the White Mountain Apache language for non-speakers. [Unpublished manuscript].
- de Reuse, Willem J.; & Goode, Phillip. (1996). Nnee biyati' yánlti'go [Speak Apache]: An introductory textbook in the San Carlos Apache language for non-speakers. [Unpublished manuscript].
- Steele, Lola; Smith, Dorothy; & Bunney, Curtis. (n.d.). Nnee Díí Kehgo Daagolii' ni' [Apaches used to live this way]. San Carlos, AZ: Rice School District No. 20.
- Steele, Lola; Smith, Dorothy; & Bunney, Curtis. (n.d.). Oshíí bígonsh'aa [I learn to read]. San Carlos, AZ: Rice School District No. 20.
- Uplegger, Francis J. (1966). Red man and white man in harmony: Songs in Apache and English. San Carlos, AZ: Lutheran Indian Mission.
- White Mountain Apache Culture Center. (1972). Apache months. Fort Apache, AZ: White Mountain Apache Culture Center.
- White Mountain Apache Culture Center. (1972). Apache plants. Fort Apache, AZ: White Mountain Apache Culture Center.
- White Mountain Apache Culture Center. (1972). Keys to reading and writing Apache. Fort Apache, AZ: White Mountain Apache Culture Center.
- White Mountain Apache Culture Center. (1972). Writing Apache. Fort Apache, AZ: White Mountain Apache Culture Center.
- Wycliffe Bible Translators. (1900). Apache reader.

=== Literature and dictionaries ===
- Basso, K. H. (1968). The Western Apache Classificatory Verb System: A Formal Analysis. Southwestern Journal of Anthropology, (3). 252.
- Basso, K. H., & Anderson, N. (1973). A Western Apache Writing System: The Symbols of Silas John. Science, (4090). 1013.
- Basso, Keith H. (1979). Portraits of "the whiteman": Linguistic play and cultural symbols among the Western Apache. Cambridge: Cambridge University Press. ISBN 0-521-29593-9.
- Basso, Keith H. (1990). Western Apache language and culture: Essays in linguistic anthropology. Tucson: University of Arizona Press. ISBN 0-8165-1323-6.
- Basso, Keith H. (1996). Wisdom sits in places: Landscape and language among the Western Apache. Albuquerque: University of New Mexico Press. ISBN 0-8263-1724-3.
- Bourke, John G.; & Condie, Carole J. (1990). Vocabulary of the Apache or 'Indé language of Arizona and New Mexico. Occasional publications in anthropology: Linguistic series, (no. 7). Greenley, CO: Museum of Anthropology, University of Northern Colorado.
- Bray, Dorothy, & White Mountain Apache Tribe. (1998). Western Apache-English dictionary: A community-generated bilingual dictionary. Tempe, AZ: Bilingual Press. ISBN 0-927534-79-7.
- De Reuse, W. J. (1997). Issues in Language Textbook Development: The Case of Western Apache.
- Goddard, Pliny E. (1918). Myths and tales from the San Carlos Apache. Anthropological papers of the American Museum of Natural History, (Vol. 24, Part 1). New York: The American Museum of Natural History.
- Goddard, Pliny E. (1919). Myths and tales from the White Mountain Apache. Anthropological papers of the American Museum of Natural History, (Vol. 24, Part 2). New York: The American Museum of Natural History.
- Goddard, Pliny E. (1919). San Carlos Apache texts. Anthropological papers of the American Museum of Natural History, (Vol. 24, Part 3). New York: The American Museum of Natural History.
- Goddard, Pliny E. (1920). White Mountain Apache texts. Anthropological papers of the American Museum of Natural History, (Vol. 24, Part 4). New York: The American Museum of Natural History.
- Gordon, Matthew; Potter, Brian; Dawson, John; de Reuse, Willem; Ladefoged, Peter (2001). "Phonetic structures of Western Apache". International Journal of American Linguistics. 67 (4): 415–481. doi:10.1086/466470. S2CID 143550122.
- Perry, Edgar. (1972). Western Apache dictionary. Fort Apache, AZ: White Mountain Apache Culture Center.
- Plocher, Johannes & Eilers, Herman. (1893). English Apache dictionary: Containing a vocabulary of the San Carlos Apache, also some White Mount. terms, and many sentences illustrating the use of the words. [Unpublished manuscript].
- Uplegger, Francis J. (1899–1964). Papers. [unpublished material].
- Uplegger, Francis J. (1900). Apache dictionary. [unpublished].
- Uplegger, Francis J. (1911). My life, how should it proceed. San Carlos, AZ [?]: Evangelical Lutheran Mission.
- Uplegger, Francis J. (1940–1960). Apache language songbook. [unpublished archival material].
