= Iván Alexander de León Aguirre =

Mexican anthropologist from Coahuila

Iván Alexander de León Aguirre is a Lipan Apache language-keeper, anthropologist, lecturer, and artist from Arteaga, Coahuila, Mexico.

== Early life ==
De León was born in the Mexican state of Coahuila in the Arteaga Mountains. As he grew up, he also spent time in the United States, "among the Apaches of western Oklahoma". His father, mother, and wider family preserved the Lipan language, while working the land with which it was associated.

According to an online biography,

From an early age, he was raised in the spirit of tradition and learned the teachings passed down from his grandparents and parents. As a child, he learned methods of hunting deer, bear, and other animals, which he used as food and as raw materials for clothing and tools. He also acquired knowledge about the animals, guardian spirits, and spiritual beings inhabiting his native mountains, as well as the properties of medicinal plants, ceremonies, and traditional healing practices.

His school education was in Spanish, and partly involved studying in Chihuahua.

== Ndé Nation ==
In 2018, De León founded the Ndé Nation association. As of 2022, De León was actively involved in seeking recognition for the Lipan people as an Indigenous people in Mexico. He points out that Lipan Apache are not the original inhabitants of Coahuila, like the Coahuiltecas and Irritilas are, but instead migrated into the region in the late 18th century. He said that much of the Apache culture in the region was lost.

He has been part of the Apache Language Council, and in 2023, delivered a speech entirely in Lipan to the tribune of the Chamber of Deputies of Mexico; a few months later, Mexico's Instituto Nacional de Lenguas Indígenas acknowledged the language, rating it as at "muy alto riesgo de desaparición" ("very high risk of disappearance"). An online biography says that

He pioneered the organization of Apache gatherings and festivals, which united Apache communities on both sides of the Mexico-US border. He has also established lasting relationships of cooperation and brotherhood with numerous Apache nations and tribes, including the Jicarilla Apache Nation of New Mexico, the San Carlos Apache Tribe of Arizona, the Mescalero Apache Tribe, the Plains Apache Tribe of Oklahoma, and the Lipan Apache Band of Texas.

In 2025, De León Aguirre accused Juan Luis Longoria Granados, leader of the N'dee/N'nee/ndé Nation, of inflating the estimated population of Apache people in Chihuahua, Coahuila, and Sonora to fraudulently obtain government funding. Longoria Granados estimated 50,000 residents were Apache. Aguirre states that only 2,000 Apache people live in these states.
