= Lipan language =

Eastern Southern Athabaskan language

Lipan
- Ndé miizaa
- Native to: Mexico, United States
- Region: Chihuahua, Coahuila, New Mexico, Texas
- Ethnicity: Lipan Apache people
- Native speakers: (undated figure of 110 in Mexico)
- Language family: Na-Dene: Athabaskan; Southern Athabaskan; Eastern; Lipan
- Writing system: Latin

Official status
- Official language in: Mexico
- Regulated by: Instituto Nacional de Lenguas Indígenas

Language codes
- ISO 639-3: apl
- Glottolog: lipa1241
- ELP: Lipan
- Lipan was classified as Extinct by the 2010 UNESCO Atlas of the World's Languages in Danger. It was classified in 2023 as at "muy alto riesgo de desaparición" ("very high risk of disappearance") by the Instituto Nacional de Lenguas Indígenas of Mexico.

Lipan (Lipan Apache: ndé miizaa) is an Eastern Southern Athabaskan language spoken by the Lipan Apache in the states of Coahuila and Chihuahua in northern Mexico, some reservations of New Mexico and parts of southern Texas. Lipan belongs to the Na-Dene languages family and it is closely related to the Jicarilla language, which is also part of the Eastern Southern Athabaskan languages.

== History ==
In 1981, it was reported that in New Mexico there were only 2 or 3 elderly speakers still alive.

On March 22, 2023, a speech in Lipan was given in the tribune of the Chamber of Deputies of Mexico. This speech was by an anthropologist and Lipan, Iván Alexander de León Aguirre, from Coahuila. The speech explained that Lipan and their language continues to exist in Mexico.

In the wake of this speech, on July 22, 2023, the Instituto Nacional de Lenguas Indígenas reported that the Lipan community estimated that there were one hundred and ten speakers of Lipan in Mexico, but that a community-based language planning council had been formed to revitalize the language. It presented and validated an official alphabet for Lipan in the Assembly Hall of Casas Grandes, Chihuahua. In 2025, De León was quoted as saying that Lipan people had teachers ready to teach their language, but required facilities from which to do it.

== Distribution ==
In Mexico, Lipan is traditionally spoken in some native communities in the states of Coahuila and Chihuahua: In Coahuila it was mainly spoken in Los Lirios and San Antonio de Alanzas in Arteaga Municipality, El Remolino and Zaragoza in Zaragoza Municipality, Sierra de Santa Rosa de Lima and Múzquiz in Múzquiz Municipality and the cities of Sabinas and Saltillo. In Chihuahua it is mainly spoken in Ciudad Juarez, the city of Chihuahua and other native towns.

Lipan was spoken in New Mexico in the Mescalero Reservation and in Texas near the Mexico–U.S. border.

== Phonology ==
=== Consonants ===
There are 30 consonants in Lipan Apache:

		Bilabial	Alveolar			Palatal	Velar	Glottal
		Bilabial	plain	sibilant	lateral	Palatal	Velar	Glottal
Nasal		m ⟨m⟩	n ⟨n⟩					
Stop	prenasal		ⁿd ⟨nd⟩					
Stop	voiceless	p ⟨b⟩	t ⟨d⟩	ts ⟨dz⟩	tɬ ⟨dl⟩	tʃ ⟨j⟩	k ⟨g⟩	ʔ ⟨'⟩
Stop	aspirated		tʰ ⟨t⟩	tsʰ ⟨ts⟩	tɬʰ ⟨tł⟩	tʃʰ ⟨ch⟩	kʰ ⟨k⟩	
Stop	ejective		tʼ ⟨t'⟩	tsʼ ⟨ts'⟩	tɬʼ ⟨tł'⟩	tʃʼ ⟨ch'⟩	kʼ ⟨k'⟩	
Fricative	voiceless			s ⟨s⟩	ɬ ⟨ł⟩	ʃ ⟨sh⟩	x ⟨x⟩	h ⟨h⟩
Fricative	voiced			z ⟨z⟩		ʒ ⟨zh⟩	ɣ ⟨gh⟩	
Approximant					l ⟨l⟩	j ⟨y⟩		

=== Vowels ===
There are 16 vowels in Lipan Apache:

		Front		Central		Back	
		short	long	short	long	short	long
Close	oral	i ⟨i⟩	iː ⟨ii⟩				
Close	nasal	ĩ ⟨į⟩	ĩː ⟨įį⟩				
Mid	oral	e ⟨e⟩	eː ⟨ee⟩			o ⟨o⟩	oː ⟨oo⟩
Mid	nasal	ẽ ⟨ę⟩	ẽː ⟨ęę⟩			õ ⟨ǫ⟩	õː ⟨ǫǫ⟩
Open	oral			a ⟨a⟩	aː ⟨aa⟩		
Open	nasal			ã ⟨ą⟩	ãː ⟨ąą⟩		

=== Tone ===
Tones are represented as high [V́], low [V̀], falling [V́V̀], and rising [V̀V́]. Rising and falling tones only occur on long vowels.

== Toponymy ==
The Lipan people preserve their own toponymic names to name important places within their history and culture that are part of the Ndé Bikéyaa ("Ndé land" in Lipan):

Mexico	Mehigu
Chihuahua City	Ją’éłąyá
Ciudad Juárez	Tsé Tahu’aya / Yaa tu enéé
Coahuila	Nacika

== Bibliography ==
- Breuninger, Evelyn; Hugar, Elbys; Lathan, Ellen Ann; & Rushforth, Scott. (1982). Mescalero Apache dictionary. Mescalero, NM: Mescalero Apache Tribe.
- Gatschet, Albert S. [1884]. Lipan words, phrases, and sentences. (Unpublished manuscript No. 81, Bureau of American Ethnology Archives, Smithsonian Institution).
- Gatschet, Albert S. [1885]. Lipan words, clans, and stories. (Unpublished manuscript No. 114, Bureau of American Ethnology Archives, Smithsonian Institution).
- Goddard, Pliny E. [1906]. Lipan texts. (Unpublished manuscript in Archives of Traditional Music, Indiana University, Bloomington.)
- Hoijer, Harry. (n.d.). Lipan texts. (Available from the American Philosophical Society, Chicago.) (Unpublished field notes, includes handwritten transcription and typed versions, 4 texts, one text published as Hoijer 1975).
- Hoijer, Harry. (1938). The southern Athapaskan languages. American Anthropologist, 40 (1), 75–87.
- Hoijer, Harry. (1942). Phonetic and phonemic change in the Athapaskan languages. Language, 18 (3), 218–220.
- Hoijer, Harry. (1945). The Apachean verb, part I: Verb structure and pronominal prefixes. International Journal of American Linguistics, 11 (4), 193–203.
- Hoijer, Harry. (1946). The Apachean verb, part II: The prefixes for mode and tense. International Journal of American Linguistics, 12 (1), 1–13.
- Hoijer, Harry. (1946). The Apachean verb, part III: The classifiers. International Journal of American Linguistics, 12 (2), 51–59.
- Hoijer, Harry. (1948). Linguistic and cultural change. Language, 24 (4), 335–345.
- Hoijer, Harry. (1956). Athapaskan kinship systems. American Anthropologist, 58 (2), 309–333.
- Hoijer, Harry. (1956). The chronology of the Athapaskan languages. International Journal of American Linguistics, 22 (4), 219–232.
- Hoijer, Harry. (1975). The history and customs of the Lipan, as told by Augustina Zuazua. Linguistics: An international review, 161, 5-37.
- Jung, Dagmar. (2000). "Word Order in Apache Narratives." In The Athabaskan Languages. (Eds. Fernald, Theodore and Platero, Paul). Oxford: Oxford UP. 92–100.
- Opler, Morris E. (1936). The kinship systems of the southern Athabaskan-speaking tribes. American Anthropologist, 38, 620–633.
- Opler, Morris E. (2001). Lipan Apache. In Raymond J. DeMallie (ed.), Plains, 941-952. Washington, D. C.: Smithsonian Institution.
- Webster, Anthony. (1999). "Lisandro Mendez’s ‘Coyote and Deer’: On narrative structures, reciprocity, and interactions." American Indian Quarterly. 23(1): 1-24.
