= Southern Athabaskan languages =

Subfamily of Athabaskan languages

Southern Athabascan
- Apachean
- Geographic distribution: Southwestern United States and northern Mexico
- Linguistic classification: Na-Dené: Athabaskan–Eyak; Athabaskan; Southern Athabascan
- Subdivisions: Plains Apache †; Western Apachean; Eastern Apachean

Language codes
- ISO 639-2 / 5: apa
- Glottolog: apac1239
- Historical distribution of Southern Athabaskan languages

- People: Apache
- Language: Apache
- Country: Apachería

Southern Athabaskan (also Apachean) is a subfamily of Athabaskan languages spoken primarily in the Southwestern United States (including Arizona, New Mexico, Colorado, and Utah) with two outliers in Oklahoma and Texas. The languages are spoken in the northern Mexican states of Sonora, Chihuahua, Coahuila and to a much lesser degree in Durango and Nuevo León. Those languages are spoken by various groups of Apache and Navajo peoples. Elsewhere, Athabaskan is spoken by many indigenous groups of peoples in Alaska, Canada, Oregon and northern California.

Self-designations for Western Apache and Navajo are N'dee biyat'i, and Diné bizaad or Naabeehó bizaad, respectively.

There are several well-known historical people whose first language was Southern Athabaskan. Geronimo (Goyaałé) who spoke Chiricahua was a famous raider and war leader. Manuelito spoke Navajo and is famous for his leadership during and after the Long Walk of the Navajo.

After splitting off the bulk of Athabaskan (perhaps as early as the first millennium BC, compare Navajo language § Classification), the Apachean branch appears to have entered southwestern North America sometime between the 11th and 16th centuries, see Apache § History, Navajo § History and Navajo language § History.

== Family division ==
The seven Southern Athabaskan languages can be divided into two groups according to the classification of Harry Hoijer: (I) Plains and (II) Southwestern. Plains Apache is the only member of the Plains Apache group. The Southwestern group can be further divided into two subgroups (A) Western and (B) Eastern. The Western subgroup consists of Western Apache, Navajo, Mescalero, and Chiricahua. The Eastern subgroup consists of Jicarilla and Lipan.

- Southern Athabaskan
  - †Plains Apache (a.k.a. Kiowa–Apache) (in Apache: Naishan)
  - Southwestern
    - Western
      - Chiricahua-Mescalero (in Apache: Ndee Bizaa)
        - Chiricahua (in Apache: N'nee biyat'i)
          - Chiricahua proper
          - Warm Springs
        - Mescalero (in Apache: Ndé Bizaa')
      - Navajo (a.k.a. Navahu˙) (in Navajo: Naabeehó bizaad, Diné bizaad)
      - Western Apache (a.k.a. Coyotero Apache) (in Apache: N'dee biyát'i)
        - Tonto (in Apache: Dilzhę́’é)
          - Northern Tonto
          - Southern Tonto
        - White Mountain
        - San Carlos
        - Cibecue (ˀa˙paču)
    - Eastern
      - Jicarilla (a.k.a. Hikariya Apache) (in Apache: Abáachi, Abáachi mizaa)
      - Lipan (in Apache: Ndé miizaa)

Hoijer's classification is based primarily on the differences of the pronunciation of the initial consonant of noun and verb stems. His earlier 1938 classification had only two branches with Plains Apache grouped together with the other Eastern languages (i.e. with Jicarilla and Lipan).

Mescalero and Chiricahua are considered different languages even though they are mutually intelligible. Western Apache (especially the Dilzhe'e variety) and Navajo are closer to each other than either is to Mescalero/Chiricahua. Lipan Apache and Plains Apache are nearly extinct, and Chiricahua is severely endangered. Mescalero, Jicarilla, and Western Apache are considered endangered as well, with some children still learning the languages despite the number of child speakers continuing to diminish. Navajo is one of the most vigorous North American languages, but has still faced decline, with use among first-graders decreasing from 90% in 1968 to 30% in 1998.

The Southern Athabaskan languages spoken in Mexico are regulated by the Instituto Nacional de Lenguas Indígenas (INALI) and have the official status of national languages of Mexico. To revitalize the languages, the institute created a community based Language Planning Council with native speakers to establish and develop grammar rules and the normalization of the writing system, an official alphabet has been validated since then while other grammar topics are still in development.

== Phonology ==
All Southern Athabaskan languages are somewhat similar in their phonology. The following description will concentrate on Western Apache. One can expect minor variations for other related languages (such as Navajo, Jicarilla, Chiricahua).

=== Consonants ===
Southern Athabaskan languages generally have a consonant inventory similar to the set of 33 consonants below (based mostly on Western Apache):

		Labial	Alveolar	Alveolar	Lateral	Palatal	Velar	Glottal
		Labial	Alveolar	(affricate series)			Velar	Glottal
Stop/ Affricate	unaspirated	p	t	ts	tɬ	tʃ	k (kʷ)	
Stop/ Affricate	aspirated		tʰ	tsʰ	tɬʰ	tʃʰ	kʰ (kʷʰ)	
Stop/ Affricate	glottalized		tʼ	tsʼ	tɬʼ	tʃʼ	kʼ	ʔ
Stop/ Affricate	prenasalized/ voiced	(ⁿb)	(ⁿd/d/n)					
Nasal	simple	m	n					
Nasal	glottalized	(ˀm)	(ˀn)					
Fricative	voiceless			s	ɬ	ʃ	x	h
Fricative	voiced	(v)		z	l	ʒ	ɣ (ɣʷ)	
Approximant						j	(w)	

- Only Navajo and Western Apache have glottalized nasals.

==== Orthography (consonants) ====
The practical orthography corresponds to the pronunciation of the Southern Athabaskan languages fairly well (as opposed to the writing systems of English or Vietnamese). Below is a table pairing up the phonetic notation with the orthographic symbol:

IPA	spelling	IPA	spelling	IPA	spelling	IPA	spelling
[t]	d	[tʰ]	t	[tʼ]	t’	[ j ]	y
[k]	g	[kʰ]	k	[kʼ]	k’	[h]	h
[ts]	dz	[tsʰ]	ts	[tsʼ]	ts’	[ʔ]	’
[tʃ]	j	[tʃʰ]	ch	[tʃʼ]	ch’	[l]	l
[tɬ]	dl	[tɬʰ]	tł	[tɬʼ]	tł’	[ɬ]	ł
[p]	b	[pʰ]	p	[ⁿb]	b/m	[ⁿd]	d/n/nd
[s]	s	[ʃ]	sh	[m]	m	[n]	n
[z]	z	[ʒ]	zh	[ˀm]	’m	[ˀn]	’n
[x]	h
[ɣ]	gh

Some spelling conventions:

1. Fricatives [h] and [x] are both written as h. (see also #2 below)
2. The fricative [x] is usually written as h, but after o it may be written as hw, especially in Western Apache (may be pronounced [xʷ]).
3. The fricative [ɣ] is written gh the majority of the time, but before i and e it is written as y (& may be pronounced [ʝ]), and before o it is written as w (& may be pronounced [ɣʷ]).
4. All words that begin with a vowel are pronounced with a glottal stop ’ [ʔ]. This glottal stop is never written at the beginning of a word.
5. Some words are pronounced either as d or n or nd, depending on the dialect of the speaker. This is represented in the consonant table above as [ⁿd]. The same is true with b and m in a few words.
6. In many words n can occur in a syllable by itself in which case it is a syllabic [n̩]. This is not indicated in the spelling.

=== Vowels ===
Southern Athabaskan languages have four vowels of contrasting tongue dimensions (as written in a general "practical" orthography):

	Front	Central	Back
High	i		
Mid	e		o
Low		a	

These vowels may also be short or long and oral (non-nasal) or nasal. Nasal vowels are indicated by an ogonek (or nasal hook) diacritic ˛ in Western Apache, Navajo, Mescalero, and Chiricahua; in Jicarilla, the nasal vowels are indicated by underlining the vowel, results in 16 different vowels:

		High-Front	Mid-Front	Mid-Back	Low-Central
Oral	short	i	e	o	a
Oral	long	ii	ee	oo	aa
Nasal	short	į	ę	ǫ	ą
Nasal	long	įį	ęę	ǫǫ	ąą

IPA equivalents for Western Apache oral vowels:

i = [ɪ], ii = [iː], e = [ɛ], ee = [ɛː], o = [o], oo = [ʊː], a = [ɐ], aa = [ɑː].

In Western Apache, there is a practice where orthographic vowels o and oo are written as u in certain contexts. These contexts do not include nasalized vowels, so nasal u never occurs in the orthography. This practice continues into the present (perhaps somewhat inconsistently).

However, in Harry Hoijer and other American linguists' work all o-vowels are written as o. Similarly, Navajo does not use orthographic u, consistently writing this vowel as o.

In Chiricahua and Mescalero, this vowel is written as u in all contexts (including nasalized ų).

Other practices may be used in other Apachean languages.

=== Tone ===
Southern Athabaskan languages are tonal languages. Hoijer and other linguists analyze Southern Athabaskan languages as having four tones (using Americanist transcription system):

- high (marked with acute accent ´, Example: á)
- low (marked with grave accent `, Example: à)
- rising (marked with háček ˇ, Example: ǎ)
- falling (marked with circumflex ˆ, Example: â)

Rising and falling tones are less common in the language (often occurring over morpheme boundaries) and often occur on long vowels. Vowels can carry tone as can syllabic n (Example: ń).

The practical orthography has tried to simplify the Americanist transcription system by representing only high tone with an acute accent and leaving low tone unmarked:

- high tone: á
- low tone: a

For example, niziz is written instead of the previous nìzìz.

Additionally, rising tone on long vowels is indicated by an unmarked first vowel and an acute accent on the second. It is vice versa for falling tone:

- rising: aá (instead of Americanist: ǎ·)
- falling: áa (instead of Americanist: â·)

Nasal vowels carry tone as well, resulting in a two diacritics on vowels with high tone: ą́ (presenting problems for computerization). Recently, de Reuse (2006) has found that Western Apache also has a mid tone, which he indicates with a macron diacritic ¯, as in ō, ǭ. In Chiricahua, a falling tone can occur on a syllabic n: n̂.

Here are some vowel contrasts involving nasalization, tone, and length from Chiricahua Apache:

cha̧a̧ 'feces'
chaa 'beaver'
shiban 'my buckskin'
shibán 'my bread'
bik’ai’ 'his hip'
bík’ai’ 'his stepmother'
hah’aał 'you two are going to chew it'
hah’ał 'you two are chewing it'

=== Comparative phonology ===
The Southern Athabascan branch was defined by Harry Hoijer primarily according to its merger of stem-initial consonants of the Proto-Athabascan series *k̯ and *c into *c (in addition to the widespread merger of *č and *čʷ into *č also found in many Northern Athabascan languages).

Proto- Athabascan		Navajo	Western Apache	Chiricahua	Mescalero	Jicarilla	Lipan	Plains Apache
*k̯uʔs	"handle fabric-like object"	-tsooz	-tsooz	-tsuuz	-tsuudz	-tsoos	-tsoos	-tsoos
*ce·	"stone"	tsé	tséé	tsé	tsé	tsé	tsí	tséé

Hoijer (1938) divided the Apachean sub-family into an Eastern branch consisting of Jicarilla, Lipan, and Plains Apache and a Western branch consisting of Navajo, Western Apache (San Carlos), Chiricahua, and Mescalero based on the merger of Proto-Apachean *t and *k to k in the Eastern branch. Thus, as can be seen in the example below, when the Western languages have noun or verb stems that start with t, the related forms in the Eastern languages will start with a k:

	Western				Eastern		
	Navajo	Western Apache	Chiricahua	Mescalero	Jicarilla	Lipan	Plains Apache
"water"	tó	tū	tú	tú	kó	kó	kóó
"fire"	kǫʼ	kǫʼ	kųų	kų	ko̱ʼ	kǫǫʼ	kǫʼ

He later revised his proposal in 1971 when he found that Plains Apache did not participate in the *k̯/*c merger, to consider Plains Apache to be equidistant from the other languages, now called Southwestern Apachean. Thus, some stems that originally started with *k̯ in Proto-Athabascan start with ch in Plains Apache, but the other languages start with ts.

Proto- Athabascan		Navajo	Chiricahua	Mescalero	Jicarilla	Plains Apache
*k̯aʔx̣ʷ	"big"	-tsaa	-tsaa	-tsaa	-tsaa	-cha

Morris Opler (1975) has suggested that Hoijer's original formulation that Jicarilla and Lipan in an Eastern branch was more in agreement with the cultural similarities between both and their differences from the other Western Apachean groups. Other linguists, particularly Michael Krauss (1973), have noted that a classification based only on the initial consonants of noun and verb stems is arbitrary and when other sound correspondences are considered the relationships between the languages appear to be more complex. Additionally, it has been pointed out by Martin Huld (1983) that since Plains Apache does not merge Proto-Athabascan *k̯/*c, Plains Apache cannot be considered an Apachean language as defined by Hoijer.

Other differences and similarities among the Southern Athabaskan languages can be observed in the following modified and abbreviated Swadesh list:

	Navajo	Chiricahua	Western Apache (San Carlos)	Jicarilla	Lipan
I	shí	shí	shíí	shí	shí
you	ni	ⁿdí	ⁿdi	ni	ⁿdí
we	nihí	náhí	nohwíí	nahí	nahí
many	łą́	łą́	łą́ą́	łá	łą́
one	ła’	ła’	ła’-	ła’	ła’-
two	naaki	naaki	naaki	naaki	naaki
big	-tso	-tso	-tso	-tso	-tso
long	-neez	-neez	-neez	-ⁿdees	-ⁿdiis
small	-yáázh	-zą́ą́yé	-zhaazh	-zhááh	-zhą́ą́yí
woman	’asdzání	’isdzáń	’isdzánhń	’isdzání	’isdzání
man	diné	nⁿdé	nnéé	diⁿdé	diⁿdí
fish	łóó’	łóí’	łóg	łógee	łǫ́’
dog	łééchą́ą́’í	kéjaa	łį́į́chaayáné	chíníí	nii’łį́
louse	yaa’	yaa	yaa’	yaa’	yaa
tree	tsin	tsin	ch’il	nooshchíí	chish
leaf	-t’ąą’	-t’ąą	-t’ąą’	-t’ąą’	-t’ąą’
meat	-tsį’	-tsįį	-tsį’	-tsį	-tsįį
blood	dił	dił	dił	dił	dił
bone	ts’in	ts’į’	ts’in	-ts’in	-ts’įh
grease	-k’ah	k’ah	k’ah	ik'a	xáí
egg	-yęęzhii	-gheezhe	-ghęęzh	-yezhii	-ghaish
horn	-dee’	-dee’	-dee’	-dee’	-dii’
tail	-tsee’	-tsee’	-tsee’	-tsee’	-dzistsii’
feather	-t’a’	-t’a’	-t’a’	-t’a’	-t’a’
hair	-ghaa’	-ghaa	-ghaa	-ghaa’	-ghaa
head	-tsii’	-tsii	-tsii	-tsii	-tsii’
ear	-jaa’	-zhaa	-jaa	-jaa	-jaa
eye	-náá’	-ⁿdáa	-náá	-ⁿdáá	-ⁿdáa
nose	-´-chį́į́h	-´-chį́	-chį́h	-chį́sh	-´-chį́sh
mouth	-zéé’	-zé	-zé’	-zé’	-zí’
tooth	-woo’	-ghoo	-ghoo’	-woo	-ghoo
tongue	-tsoo’	-zaade	-zaad	-zaadi	-zaadi
claw	-s-gaan	-s-gan	-gan	-s-gan	-s-gąą
foot	-kee’	-kee	-kee’	-kee	-kii
knee	-god	-go’	-god	-go’	-goh
hand	-´-la’	-laa	-la’	-la’	-laa’
