= Southern Apache Museum =

Museum in Houston, Texas, United States

- Former name: Southern Plains Museum and Cultural Center
- Location: Houston, Texas
- Coordinates: 29.798565°N 95.453642°W
- Website: apachemuseum.org

The Southern Apache Museum is a nonprofit 501(c)(3) in Houston, Texas located 9600 Hempstead Highway, 550 Northwest Mall.

This museum was created to educate the public about Native American history and cultures in Texas.

== Opening ==
The Southern Apache Museum (SAM) was founded by Chance L. Landry, an author and visual artist, who identifies as a Lipan Apache descent. On display in the museum are many original Native American paintings by Chance Landry depicting Native American Indian history in Texas. Southern Apache Museum had its grand opening on March 10, 2012.

== Closing ==
Southern Apache museumI closed in 2017 due to the owners of the mall engaging in redevelopment of its space. Virtual museum Now open!. We are looking for a new brick and mortor location. e_{mail any possible donated buildings, office spaces, or classrooms etc. please call 281-686-1462 chance landry}

== Virtual museum ==
The Southern Apache Museum launched a virtual Southern Plains Museum and Culture Center. visit virtual museum here https://www.apachemuseum.org/southern-plains-museum-and-cultural-center.html The City of Houston helped fund this educational endeavor.
