= Mescalero-Chiricahua language =

Language spoken in Oklahoma and New Mexico

Chiricahua
- Ndee bizaa
- Native to: Mexico and USA
- Region: Sonora, Chihuahua, Oklahoma, New Mexico
- Ethnicity: Chiricahua, Mescalero
- Native speakers: 1,500 (2007)
- Language family: Na-Dene: Athabaskan; Southern Athabaskan; Southwestern Apache; Western; Chiricahua

Official status
- Recognised minority language in: Mexico
- Regulated by: Instituto Nacional de Lenguas Indígenas

Language codes
- ISO 639-3: apm
- Glottolog: mesc1238
- ELP: Mescalero-Chiricahua
- Mescalero-Chiricahua is classified as Severely Endangered by the UNESCO Atlas of the World's Languages in Danger.

Mescalero-Chiricahua (also known as Chiricahua Apache) is a Southern Athabaskan language spoken by the Chiricahua and Mescalero people in Chihuahua and Sonora, México and in Oklahoma and New Mexico. It is related to Navajo and Western Apache and has been described in great detail by the anthropological linguist Harry Hoijer (1904–1976), especially in Hoijer & Opler (1938) and Hoijer (1946). Hoijer & Opler's Chiricahua and Mescalero Apache Texts, including a grammatical sketch and traditional religious and secular stories, has been converted into an online "book" available from the University of Virginia.

Virginia Klinekole, the first female president of the Mescalero Apache Tribe, was known for her efforts to preserve the language.

There is at least one language-immersion school for children in Mescalero.

== Phonology ==
=== Consonants ===
Chiricahua has 31 consonants:

		Bilabial	Alveolar			Post- alveolar	Palatal	Velar	Glottal
		Bilabial	plain	sibilant	lateral	Post- alveolar	Palatal	Velar	Glottal
Nasal	simple	m	n						
Nasal	post-stopped	(mᵇ)	nᵈ						
Plosive	plain	p	t	ts	tˡ~tɬ	tʃ		k	ʔ
Plosive	aspirated		tʰ	tsʰ	tɬʰ	tʃʰ		kʰ	ʔ
Plosive	ejective		tʼ	tsʼ	tɬʼ	tʃʼ		kʼ	ʔ
Fricative	voiceless			s	ɬ	ʃ		x	h
Fricative	voiced			z	ɮ	ʒ	ʝ	ɣ	

=== Vowels ===
Chiricahua has 16 vowels:

		Front		Central		Back	
		short	long	short	long	short	long
High	oral	i	iː				
High	nasal	ĩ	ĩː				
Mid	oral	ɛ	ɛː			o	oː
Mid	nasal	ɛ̃	ɛ̃ː			õ	õː
Low	oral			a	aː		
Low	nasal			ã	ãː		

Chiricahua has phonemic oral, nasal, short, and long vowels.

== Sources ==
- Hoijer, Harry. (n.d.). Chiricahua Apache stems. (Unpublished manuscript).
- Hoijer, Harry (1938). "The southern Athapaskan languages". American Anthropologist. 40 (1): 75–87. doi:10.1525/aa.1938.40.1.02a00080.
- Hoijer, Harry (1939). "Chiricahua loan-words from Spanish". Language. 15 (2): 110–115. doi:10.2307/408729. JSTOR 408729.
- Hoijer, Harry (1945). "Classificatory verb stems in the Apachean languages". International Journal of American Linguistics. 11 (1): 13–23. doi:10.1086/463846.
- Hoijer, Harry (1945). "The Apachean verb, part I: Verb structure and pronominal prefixes". International Journal of American Linguistics. 11 (4): 193–203. doi:10.1086/463871.
- Hoijer, Harry (1946). "The Apachean verb, part II: The prefixes for mode and tense". International Journal of American Linguistics. 12 (1): 1–13. doi:10.1086/463881.
- Hoijer, Harry (1946). "The Apachean verb, part III: The classifiers". International Journal of American Linguistics. 12 (2): 51–59. doi:10.1086/463889.
- Hoijer, Harry (1946). "Chiricahua Apache". In Osgood, C. (ed.). Linguistic structures in North America. New York: Wenner-Green Foundation for Anthropological Research.
- Hoijer, Harry; Opler, Morris E. (1980) [1938, University of Chicago Press; 1964, University of Chicago Press; 1970, University of Chicago Press]. Chiricahua and Mescalero Apache texts. New York: AMS Press. ISBN 0-404-15783-1.
- Opler, Morris E.; Hoijer, Harry (1940). "The raid and war-path language of the Chiricahua Apache". American Anthropologist. 42 (4): 617–634. doi:10.1525/aa.1940.42.4.02a00070.
- Pinnow, Jürgen (1988). Die Sprache der Chiricahua-Apachen: Mit Seitenblicken auf das Mescalero [The language of the Chiricahua Apache: With side glances at the Mescalero] (in German). Hamburg: Helmut Buske.
- Webster, Anthony K. (2006). "On Speaking to Him (Coyote): The Discourse Functions of the yi-/bi- Alternation in Some Chiricahua Apache Narratives". Southwest Journal of Linguistics. 25 (2): 143–160.
- Young, Robert W. (1983). "Apachean languages". In Ortiz, A. (ed.). Handbook of North American Indians. Vol. 10: Southwest. Washington: Smithsonian Institution. pp. 393–400. ISBN 0-16-004579-7.
