= Margo Tamez =

American author from Texas

- Born: January 28, 1962 (age 64); Austin, Texas, United States
- Occupations: Poet, historian, scholar, Indigenous rights
- Writing career
- Period: 1980s–present
- Notable works: Naked Wanting, Raven Eye

Margo Tamez (born January 28, 1962, in Austin, Texas, United States) is a historian, poet, and activist from Texas. She is a member of the Lipan Apache Band of Texas, an organization that does not have federal or state recognition.

A scholar, poet, and Indigenous rights defender, Tamez grew up in South Texas, the Lower Rio Grande Valley, and along the Texas-Mexico border.

Tamez's 2007 work, Raven Eye, is a literary work of the American poetry form known as the 'long poem', a form developed by Norman Dubie. Raven Eye won the 2008 WILLA Literary Award in poetry. In Raven Eye, Tamez drew from Athabaskan and Nahua creation stories, oral history, and Lipan Apache genocide narratives in combination with autobiography. Raven Eye connected the Lipan Apache oral narrative structure from the Lower Rio Grande valley and southern Texas to a literary aesthetic form that included pictorial writing and history of resistance. Her poetry is best known for stark, detailed examinations of gender violence, identity, non-recognition, genocide, and spaces of abjection (walls, the camp, death march, exile). Her prose reflects the critical views of processes and ongoing effects of fragmentation, historical erasure, and dispossession on Indigenous peoples, making crucial links between history and present forces (colonization, militarization) impacting Indigenous self-determination in regions bifurcated by settler nation borders where those who remained in traditional places were largely ignored by the state.

== Selected bibliography ==
=== Poetry and criticism ===
- Naked Wanting (University of Arizona Press, 2003).
- Raven Eye (University of Arizona Press, 2007).
- "Open Letter to Cameron County Commission," 2 Crit 110 (2009).
- "My Mother in Her Being--Photograph ca. 1947," Callaloo, Vol. 32, No. 1, Winter 2009, pp. 185–187.
- "Restoring Lipan Apache Women's Laws, Lands and Strength in El Calaboz Rancheria at the Texas-Mexico Border," Signs, Vol. 35, No. 3, 2010, pp. 558–569.
- "Our Way of Life is Our Resistance": Indigenous Women and Anti-Imperialist Challenges to Militarization along the U.S.-Mexico Border," Works and Days, Invisible Battlegrounds: Feminist Resistance in the Global Age of War and Imperialism, Susan Comfort, Editor, 57/58: Vol. 20, 2011.
- Father/Genocide, Turtle Point Press, 2021

=== Anthologies ===
- Dance the Guns to Silence: 100 Poems Inspired by Ken Saro-Wiwa
- Sister Nations, Heid Erdrich and Laura Tohe (Editors), New Rivers Press.
- Stories from Where We Live: The Gulf Coast, Sara St. Antoine (Editor), Milkweed Editions.
- Southwestern Women: New Voices, Caitlin L. Gannon (Editor), Javelina Pr.
