= Three Rivers, New Mexico =

Unincorporated community in New Mexico, United States

- Unincorporated community
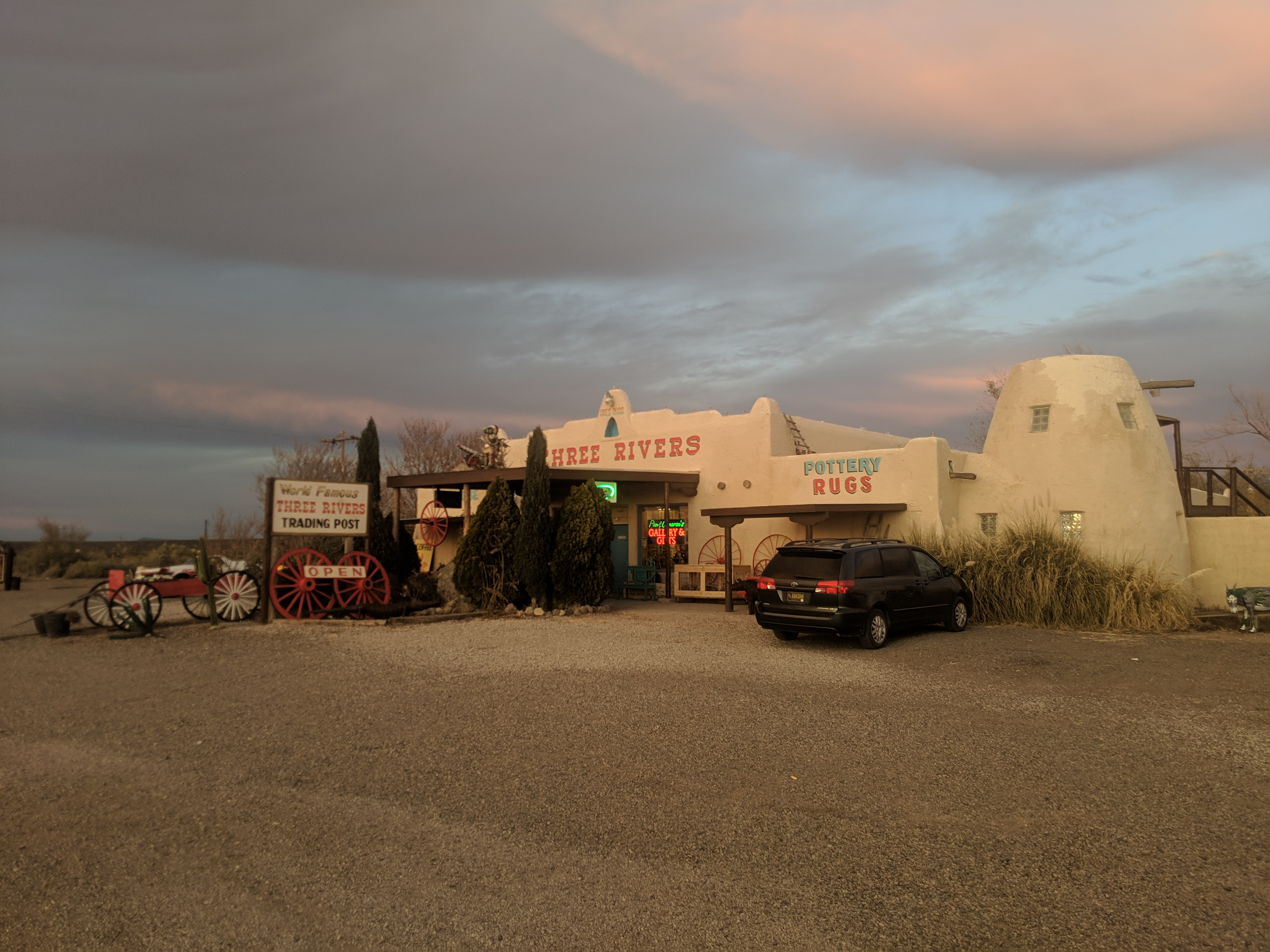
- Three Rivers Trading Post

- Location within the state of New Mexico Three Rivers, New Mexico (the United States)
- Coordinates: 33°19′17″N 106°04′30″W
- Country: United States
- State: New Mexico
- County: Otero County
- Elevation: 4,570 ft (1,390 m)
- Time zone: UTC-7 (Mountain (MST))
  - Summer (DST): UTC-6 (CDT)
- GNIS feature ID: 920716

Three Rivers is an unincorporated community in northern Otero County, New Mexico, United States.

== Notable people ==
- Virginia Klinekole, first female president of the Mescalero Apache, 1959
- Colin R. McMillan, businessman and politician
- Sara Misquez, president of the Mescalero Apache
