= Harry Hoijer =

American linguistic anthropologist (1904–1976)

- Born: September 6, 1904; Chicago, Illinois
- Died: March 4, 1976 (aged 71); Santa Monica, California
- Known for: Sapir–Whorf hypothesis
- Scientific career
- Fields: Linguistics; anthropology
- Institutions: University of Chicago
- Academic advisors: Edward Sapir

Harry Hoijer (September 6, 1904 – March 11, 1976) was an American linguist and anthropologist who worked on primarily Athabaskan languages and culture. He additionally documented the Tonkawa language, which is now extinct. Hoijer's few works make up the bulk of material on this language. Hoijer was a student of Edward Sapir.

Hoijer contributed greatly to the documentation of the Southern and Pacific Coast Athabaskan languages and to the reconstruction of proto-Athabaskan. Harry Hoijer collected a large number of valuable fieldnotes on many Athabaskan languages, which are unpublished. Some of his notes on Lipan Apache and the Tonkawa language are lost.

Hoijer coined the term "Sapir–Whorf hypothesis". He died in Santa Monica, California, on March 4, 1976.

== Bibliography ==
- Beals, Ralph L. (1977). "Harry Hoijer, 1904–1976". American Anthropologist. 79 (1): 105–110. doi:10.1525/aa.1977.79.1.02a00100.
- Bright, William (1964). "A bibliography of the publications of Harry Hoijer through 1963". International Journal of American Linguistics. 30 (2): 169–174. doi:10.1086/464772. S2CID 143691165.
- Earle, Timothy (ed.) (1984): On the Evolution of Complex Societies: Essays in Honor of Harry Hoijer 1982, Undena (for the UCLA Dept.of Anthr.), Malibu, CA..
- Kendall, Daythal L.; Landar, Herbert (1977). "The Hoijer Papers". International Journal of American Linguistics. 43 (4): 355. doi:10.1086/465506. S2CID 144320752.
- Landar, Herbert (1977). "Harry Hoijer (1904–1976) An annotated bibliography". International Journal of American Linguistics. 43 (4): 339–354. doi:10.1086/465505. S2CID 143579577.
- Maquet, Jacques (ed.)(1980), articles by Joseph Greenberg, Dell Hymes, Paul W. Friederich:On Linguistic Anthropology: Essays in Honor of Harry Hoijer 1979, Undena (for the UCLA Dept. of Anthr.), Malibu, CA..
- Maquet, Jacques (ed.)(1982): On Symbols in Anthropology: Essays in Honor of Harry Hoijer 1980, Undena (for the UCLA Dept. of Anthr.), Malibu, CA..
- Maquet, Jacques, Daniels, Nancy (eds.) (1984), articles by Sidney Mintz, Maurice Godelier, Bruce Trigger: On Marxian Perspectives in Anthropology. Essays in Honor of Harry Hoijer, 1981, Undena (for the UCLA Dept. of Anthr.), Malibu, CA.
- Williams, B. J., (ed.)(1986), articles by L.L. Cavelli-Sforza, et alii: On Evolutionary Anthropology. Essays in Honor of Harry Hoijer 1983, Undena (for the UCLA Dept. of Anthr.), Malibu, CA..

=== Works by Hoijer ===
- [Beals, Ralph L].; & Hoijer, Harry. (1953). An introduction to anthropology. New York: Macmillan Company. (Republished 1959, 1965, and 1971).
- Hoijer, Harry. (n.d.). Chiricahua Apache stems. [Unpublished manuscript].
- Hoijer, Harry. (n.d.). Mescalero Apache stems. [Unpublished manuscript].
- Hoijer, Harry. (1933). Tonkawa: An Indian language of Texas. New York: Columbia University. (Extract from Handbook of American Indian languages, Vol. 3).
- Hoijer, Harry (1938). "The southern Athapaskan languages". American Anthropologist. 40 (1): 75–87. doi:10.1525/aa.1938.40.1.02a00080.
- Hoijer, Harry (1939). "Chiricahua loan-words from Spanish". Language. 15 (2): 110–115. doi:10.2307/408729. JSTOR 408729.
- Hoijer, Harry (1943). "Pitch accent in the Apachean languages". Language. 19 (1): 38–41. doi:10.2307/410317. JSTOR 410317.
- Hoijer, Harry. (1945). Navaho phonology. University of New Mexico publications in anthropology, (No. 1).
- Hoijer, Harry (1945). "Classificatory verb stems in the Apachean languages". International Journal of American Linguistics. 11 (1): 13–23. doi:10.1086/463846. S2CID 144468739.
- Hoijer, Harry (1945). "The Apachean verb, part I: Verb structure and pronominal prefixes". International Journal of American Linguistics. 11 (4): 193–203. doi:10.1086/463871. S2CID 143582901.
- Hoijer, Harry. (1946). Chiricahua Apache. In C. Osgood (Ed.), Linguistic structures in North America. New York: Wenner-Green Foundation for Anthropological Research.
- Hoijer, Harry (1946). "The Apachean verb, part II: The prefixes for mode and tense". International Journal of American Linguistics. 12 (1): 1–13. doi:10.1086/463881. S2CID 143035135.
- Hoijer, Harry (1946). "The Apachean verb, part III: The classifiers". International Journal of American Linguistics. 12 (2): 51–59. doi:10.1086/463889. S2CID 144657113.
- Hoijer, Harry (1948). "Linguistic and cultural change". Language. 24 (4): 335–345. doi:10.2307/410353. JSTOR 410353.
- Hoijer, Harry (1948). "The Apachean verb, part IV: Major form classes". International Journal of American Linguistics. 14 (4): 247–259. doi:10.1086/464013. S2CID 144801708.
- Hoijer, Harry (1949). "The Apachean verb, part V: The theme and prefix complex". International Journal of American Linguistics. 15 (1): 12–22. doi:10.1086/464020. S2CID 143799617.
- Hoijer, Harry (1951). "Cultural Implications of Some Navaho Linguistic Categories". Language. 27 (2): 111–120. doi:10.2307/410424. JSTOR 410424.
- Hoijer, Harry (1956). "Athapaskan kinship systems". American Anthropologist. 58 (2): 309–333. doi:10.1525/aa.1956.58.2.02a00080.
- Hoijer, Harry (1956). "The Chronology of the Athapaskan languages". International Journal of American Linguistics. 22 (4): 219–232. doi:10.1086/464374. S2CID 144276480.
- Hoijer, Harry. (1963). The Athapaskan languages. In H. Hoijer (Ed.), Studies in the Athapaskan languages (pp. 1–29). Berkeley: University of California Press.
- Hoijer, Harry (1966). "Navaho". Lingua. 17 (1–2): 88–102. doi:10.1016/0024-3841(66)90005-2.
- Hoijer, Harry (1966). "Galice Athapaskan: A Grammatical Sketch". International Journal of American Linguistics. 32 (4): 320–327. doi:10.1086/464921. S2CID 143307601.
- Hoijer, Harry (1968). "Navaho Reference Verbs and Verb Expressions Made Up of Two Verb Forms". International Journal of American Linguistics. 34 (3): 176–182. doi:10.1086/465011. S2CID 143104146.
- Hoijer, Harry (1969). "Internal Reconstruction in Navaho". Word. 25 (1–3): 154–159. doi:10.1080/00437956.1969.11435565.
- Hoijer, Harry. (1970). A Navajo lexicon. University of California Publications in Linguistics (No. 78). Berkeley: University of California Press.
- Hoijer, Harry. (1971). Athapaskan morphology. In J. Sawyer (Ed.), Studies in American Indian languages (pp. 113–147). University of California publications in linguistics (No. 65). Berkeley: University of California Press.
- Hoijer, Harry. (1971). The position of the Apachean languages in the Athpaskan stock. In K. H. Basso & M. E. Opler (Eds.), Apachean culture history and ethnology (pp. 3–6). Tucson: University of Arizona Press.
- Hoijer, Harry. (1971). “Patterns of Meaning in Navaho.” In Themes in Culture. (eds. Zamora, Mario; Mahar, J.M.; and Orenstein, Henry.). Quezon City: Kayumanggi Publishers. 227–237.
- Hoijer, Harry (1975). "The history and customs of the Lipan, as told by Augustina Zuazua". Linguistics. 13 (161): 5–38. doi:10.1515/ling.1975.13.161.5. S2CID 144679924.
- Hoijer, Harry; & Opler, Morris E. (1938). Chiricahua and Mescalero Apache texts. The University of Chicago publications in anthropology; Linguistic series. Chicago: University of Chicago Press. (Reprinted 1964 by Chicago: University of Chicago Press; in 1970 by Chicago: University of Chicago Press; & in 1980 under H. Hoijer by New York: AMS Press, ISBN 978-0-404-15783-8).
- Opler, Morris E.; Hoijer, Harry (1940). "The raid and war-path language of the Chiricahua Apache". American Anthropologist. 42 (4): 617–634. doi:10.1525/aa.1940.42.4.02a00070.

=== Works edited by Hoijer ===
- Hoijer, Harry (Ed.). (1954). Language in culture: Conference on the interrelations of language and other aspects of culture. Chicago: University of Chicago Press.
- Hoijer, Harry (Ed.). (1963). Studies in the Athapaskan languages. University of California publications in linguistics (No. 29). Berkeley: University of California Press.
- Sapir, Edward, & Hoijer, Harry. (1967). Navaho texts. William Dwight Whitney series, Linguistic Society of America.
- Sapir, Edward, & Hoijer, Harry. (1967). Phonology and morphology of the Navaho language. Berkeley: University of California Press.
