= Virginia Klinekole =

American politician (1924–2011)

Virginia Shanta Klinekole

Mescalero Apache Tribal Council Member and President
- In office 1959–1986

Tularosa School Board
- In office 1960s – late 1960s

Mescalero Apache School Board
- In office 1980s–1990s

New Mexico Indian Education Advisory Council
- In office 1980s–1980s

Personal details
- Born: Virginia Shanta; June 13, 1924 Three Rivers, New Mexico
- Died: March 13, 2011 (aged 86) Three Rivers, New Mexico
- Spouse: Bruce W. Klinekole
- Children: Bruce W. Klinekole II, Gregg A. Klinekole, Gina R. Klinekole, Ruth "Wonzie" Klinekole Tiger
- Awards: Governor's Award for Outstanding New Mexican Women, 1988

Virginia Shanta Klinekole (June 13, 1924 – March 13, 2011), born Virginia Shanta, was a Mescalero Apache politician from New Mexico. She was elected as the first woman president of the Mescalero Apache Tribe, and served on the Tribal Council for nearly 30 years. She was known for being the first elected female leader of a major tribe, and for her work in preserving the Apache language.

== Early life and education ==
She was born Virginia Shanta and raised in Three Rivers, New Mexico, where she lived all of her life. She attended local and boarding schools. Shanta was reared in the Roman Catholic faith.

== Career ==
Klinekole worked as the Tularosa Public School Educational Liaison for the Mescalero Tribe, and strongly supported education for the children of the reservation, working to preserve the Apache language. She was "a member of the Tularosa School Board in the late 1960s and served on the Mescalero Apache School Board in the 1980s and 90s. She served on the New Mexico Indian Education Advisory Council in the 1980s and received the third annual governor's award for outstanding New Mexican women in 1988."

In 1959 she was elected as the first woman president of the Mescalero Apache, becoming "the first woman elected to lead any major tribe in the United States."

Following her term, she was repeatedly elected as a member of the Mescalero Apache Tribal Council. She served as a member until 1986, taking part in every aspect of managing the reservation.

== Personal life ==
She married Bruce W. Klinekole, who was a survivor of the Bataan Death March. They had four children: Bruce W. Klinekole II, Gregg A. Klinekole, Gina R. Klinekole, and Ruth "Wonzie" Klinekole Tiger. Her granddaughter Lindsey Shakespeare is a beadwork artist and doll maker.

== See also ==
- List of Native American politicians
- Native American women in politics
