= Lipan Apache Band of Texas =

Cultural organization in Texas

- Named after: Lipan Apache people, State of Texas
- Formation: 1999
- Founded at: Edinburg, Texas
- Type: Nonprofit organization
- Tax ID no.: US Texas TIN 32001461261; EIN 742953145
- Legal status: active
- Location: United States
- Members: 745 (2022)
- Official language: English
- Chairman: Richard Gonzalez (2022)
- Affiliations: Texas Tribal Buffalo Project
- Website: lipanapachebandoftexas.com

The Lipan Apache Band of Texas is a cultural heritage organization for individuals who identify as descendants of Lipan Apache people. The organization is based in Edinburg, Texas, with members living in Texas, Louisiana, California, and Mexico. It is neither a federally nor state-recognized tribe.

Other unrecognized organizations who also identify as Lipan Apache descendants include the Apache Council of Texas (Alice), Cuelgahen Nde Lipan Apache of Texas (Three Rivers), and the Lipan Apache Nation (San Antonio). The Lipan Apache Tribe of Texas (McAllen) is a separate organization and is state-recognized.

== Organization ==
The Lipan Apache Band of Texas, Inc., became a 501(c)(3) nonprofit organization in 1999. It is based in Edinburg, Texas.

Officers of the organization include:

- Tribal chairman: Richard Gonzalez
- Director and registered agent: Daniel Castro Romero Jr.
- Director: Richard A. Gonzalez
- Director: Rudy S. Perez
- Secretary: Virginia C. Romero

The Texas State Senate passed a congratulatory resolution to honor the Lipan Apache Band of Texas.

== Petition for federal recognition ==
In 1999, Daniel Castro Romero Jr. of San Antonio submitted a letter of intent to petition the U.S. federal government for recognition of the Lipan Apache Band of Texas, Inc.; however, the group never followed up with a complete petition for recognition.

== Activities ==
The Lipan Apache Band of Texas hosts an annual powwow in Fort Clark Springs, Texas, which has been honored in a congratulatory resolution. Each March, they participate in a living history celebration at Fort Clark.

The Mexican state of Coahuila invited LABT members to visit for a cultural exchange in 2009. In 2012, the group worked with the University of Texas Human Rights Clinic and LAW-Defense to create an "Early Action/Early Warning procedure report to stop racial discrimination.

Lucille Contreras, an LABT member, launched the Texas Tribal Buffalo Project in 2021. She purchased 77 acres (31 ha) in Waelder, Texas; formed a nonprofit organization; and developed a herd of American bison. The Nature Conservancy helped provide five bison to the project.

== Notable members ==
- Margo Tamez, historian, poet

== See also ==
- Mescalero Apache Tribe of the Mescalero Reservation
