= Jicarilla language =

Athabaskan language spoken in New Mexico

Jicarilla
- Abáachi mizaa
- Native to: United States
- Region: New Mexico
- Ethnicity: 3,100 Jicarilla Apache (2007)
- Native speakers: 510 (2015 census)
- Language family: Na-Dene: Athabaskan; Southern Athabaskan; Eastern; Jicarilla

Language codes
- ISO 639-3: apj
- Glottolog: jica1244
- ELP: Jicarilla Apache
- Jicarilla Apache is classified as Severely Endangered by the UNESCO Atlas of the World's Languages in Danger.

Jicarilla (Jicarilla Apache: Abáachi mizaa) is an Eastern Southern Athabaskan language spoken by the Jicarilla Apache.

== History ==
The traditional homelands of the Jicarilla Apache (Tinde) were located in the northeast and eastern regions of New Mexico. The Jicarilla Apache expanded over the Texas and Oklahoma panhandles and into the southeast section of Colorado and southwest corner of Kansas. The area supported the Jicarilla Apache with Plains Indian lifestyle. The tribe was divided among in this homeland by two clans: White Clan and Red Clan. The Jicarilla Apache went through multiple battles that led them to leave this homeland and were forced to relocate on a reservation in present day Dulce, New Mexico.

== Language revitalization ==
680 people reported their language as Jicarilla on the 2000 census. However, Golla (2007) reported that there were about 300 first-language speakers and an equal or greater number of semi-speakers (out of a total ethnic population of 3,100); the census figures therefore presumably include both fluent and semi-speakers. In 2003, the Jicarilla Apache Nation became the first Tribe in New Mexico to certify community members to teach a Native American language. By 2012, revitalization efforts had included the compilation of a dictionary, classes, and seasonal camps for young people.

== Phonology ==
=== Consonants ===
Jicarilla has 34 consonants:

		Labial	Alveolar			Palatal	Velar		Glottal
		Labial	plain	sibilant	lateral	Palatal	plain	labial	Glottal
Nasal		m	n						
Stop	voiced		d						
Stop	voiceless	p	t	ts	tɬ	tʃ	k	kʷ	ʔ
Stop	aspirated		tʰ	tsʰ	tɬʰ	tʃʰ	kʰ	kʷʰ	
Stop	ejective		tʼ	tsʼ	tɬʼ	tʃʼ	kʼ		
Fricative	voiceless			s	ɬ	ʃ	x	xʷ	h
Fricative	voiced			z		ʒ	ɣ	ɣʷ	
Approximant					l	j			

- What has developed into /d/ in Jicarilla corresponds to /n/ and /ⁿd/ in other Southern Athabaskan languages (e.g. Navajo and Chiricahua).

==== Aspirated stops ====
The consonant /tʰ/, occurring in most other Athabaskan languages, only occurs alone in a few forms in Jicarilla and has mostly merged with /kʰ/. This consequently has made most of the aspirated stops in Jicarilla velar.

==== Fricatives and approximants ====
- [w] and [ɰʷ] are allophones of /ɣʷ/.
- [ɰ] is an allophone of /ɣ/.

==== Nasals ====
- /m/ is never found word-finally and its most frequent position is in prefixes.
- /n/: See section on Syllabic /n/.

==== Syllabic /n/ ====
The consonant /n/ can appear as a syllable and bear a high or low tone, but not a falling tone. High-toned /ń/ actually represents an underlying syllable, /nÍ/. There are four possible contours for Vowel-/n/ and /n/-/n/ combinations: Low-high, High-low, High-high, and Low-low. The contours are illustrated in the following table:

Contour	Vowel-/n/ Combination	Gloss	/n/-/n/ Combination	Gloss
Low-High	héenkés	'What time is it?'	Nńde	'stand up'
High-low	Ánł’íí	'You (sg.) are doing something, trying'	ńnshé	'You sheared it'
High-high	’igo’áń	'hole'	Ha’ńń	'whoever'
Low-low	‘ágonlaa	'You (sg.) made something'	Bił nnzíí	'You got sleepy'

(Modified from Tuttle & Sandoval 2002, p. 109)

/n/ may occur between /t/, /ʔ/, or /n/ and any stem-initial consonant, but when /n/ occurs alone before a stem-initial consonant, it forms a syllable of its own. When preceded by another prefix consonant, /n/ may or may not be judged to form a syllable by native speakers of Jicarilla.

=== Vowels ===
Jicarilla has 16 vowels:

		Front		Central		Back	
		short	long	short	long	short	long
Close	oral	i (ɪ)	iː				
Close	nasal	ĩ (ɪ̃)	ĩː (ɪ̃ː)				
Close-mid	oral	e	eː			o (ʊ)	oː
Close-mid	nasal	ẽ	ẽː			õ	õː
Open	oral			a (ə)	aː		
Open	nasal			ã	ãː		

All vowels may be

- oral or nasal
- short or long

The long high front oral vowel is phonetically higher than its nasal and short counterparts ([iː] vs. [ɪ, ɪ̃, ɪ̃ː]). The short back vowel is higher than its long and nasal counterparts ([ʊ] vs. [oː, õ, õː]). The short low vowel is higher than its long and nasal counterparts ([ə] vs. [aː, ã, ãː]).

Nasal vowels are indicated by underlining in the Jicarilla orthography.

- There are oral and nasal versions of each vowel, but not all combinations of vowel quality, nasality, and tone are possible.

=== Tone ===
Jicarilla has three different tones: high, low, and falling.

High tone is indicated with an acute accent. Low tone is unmarked. Falling tone is indicated by a sequence of acute-accented vowel and an unmarked vowel.

- high tone: tsé [tsʰé] (rock), dééh [téːx] (tea)
- low tone: ts’e [ts’è] 'sagebrush', jee [tʃèː] 'pitch'
- falling tone: zháal [ʒâːl] (money), ha’dáonáa [xàʔtáònâː] (how?)

=== Syllables ===
==== Syllable structure ====
Syllables may be constructed as CV, CVC, or CV:C (C – Consonant; V – Vowel) depending on the morphology of a sequence. Onset may be any consonant, but coda consonants are limited to /ʔ/, /l/, /ɬ/, /ʃ/, /h/, /s/ and /n/.

==== Syllable duration ====
A study of the durational effects of Jicarilla Apache show that morphology and prosody both affect and determine the durational realization of consonants and syllables. It was found that in a recording of a passage read by native speakers stem, suffix, and particle syllables were found to be longer than prefix syllables, but there is not enough a distinction to see difference in duration. Syllables at the end of phrases were lengthened differently from syllables lengthened because of stress; this is in regards to a ratio of onset lengthening to rhyme lengthening. This study was only a beginning to analysis of Apachean language prosody.

== Morphophonology ==
The Athabaskan morphophonological process known as the "d-effect" occurs when 1st pl/dual iid- is prefixed to a verb stem. The following examples are taken from Phone, Olson and Martinez 2007: 39:

- -iid- + classifier [ɬ] → [ɬ]
  - ex. óołkai (< /ʔo-iːt-ɬ-kʰaiʔ/) 'we two count it'
- -iid- + stem initial [ʔ] → [t’]
  - ex. hit’aał (< /hi-iːt-ʔaaɬ/) 'we two chew it'
- -iid- + stem initial [m] → [h]
  - ex. hiihmas (< /hi-iːt-mas/) 'we two are rolling'
- -iid- + stem initial [n] → [h]
  - ex. goohndé (< /go-iːt-nté/) 'we two shout'
- -iid- + stem initial [j] → [t], [ts]
  - ex. hiidá (< /hi-iːt-já/) 'we two eat it'
- -iid- + stem initial gh [ɣ] → [k]
  - ex. hiigá (< /hi-iːt-ɣá/) 'we two kill them'
- -iid- + stem initial [z] → [ts]
  - ex. naa’iidzii(< /naː-í-iːt-ziː/) 'we two work'
- -iid- + stem initial [l] → [tɬ]
  - ex. haatƚee (< /ha-iːt-leː/) 'we two pull it out with a rope'
- -iid- + other consonant → ø (zero)
  - ex. hiiká (< /hi-iːt-kʰáʔ/) 'we two pound (a drum)'

== Sample text ==
Excerpt from Wilson & Martine (1996: 125-126)
Abáchii miizaa	English Translation
Shíí Rita shíízhii. Lósii’yé shii’deeshchíí shíí á’ee néésai. Shiika’éé na’iizii’íí nahiikéyaa’íí miiná’iisdzo’íí éí yaa shishíí. Shii’máá éí gé koghá’yé sidá nahaa daashishíí. Shiidádéé naakii. Dáłaa’é éí édii. Dáłaa’é éí dá aada’é miigha. Shiishdázha dáłánéé. Ałtso nada’iizii. Łe’ dá á’ee Lósii’ee daamigha. Isgwéela’yé naséyá, éí Lósii’ee naséyá dá áństs’íísédá. Łe’gó Santa Fe’yé dáłaa’é hai shee goslíí á’ee. Łe’gó Ináaso’yé éí kái’ii hai shee goslíí....	My name is Rita. I was born and grew up in Dulce. My father worked to take care of our land. My mother stayed home and took care of all of us. I had two sisters. One of them is deceased. The other lives far from here. I have many younger sisters. They all work. Some of them live in Dulce. When I was a youngster, I went to school in Dulce. Then I lived for a year in Santa Fe. Later I lived three years in Ignacio....

== Vocabulary ==
=== Jicarilla words of Spanish origin ===
The Jicarilla people have been in contact with Spanish-speaking and English-speaking peoples for a long time and have over time adopted loanwords that have influenced Jicarilla phonology. Most of the sounds used to take in a loanword from Spanish are sounds in Jicarilla. Some sounds not occurring in Jicarilla phonology are changed into Jicarilla as follows:

- /r/ → /l/ or /lal/ as in alalóos (from Spanish ‘arroz’ ‘rice’); goléelo (from correo ‘mail’)
- /ɾ/ → /ɬ/ as in déełbidi (from intérprete 'interpreter')
  - Or /l/ as in béela (from pera 'pear')
- /f/ → /h/ as in as’dóoha (from estufa 'stove')
  - Or /ʔ/ as in ga’ée (from café 'coffee')
  - Or /k/ as in kéesda (from fiesta 'party')
- /gu/ → /ɣʷoː/ as in awóoha (from aguja 'needle')
- /b/ → /p/ as in báaso (from vaso 'drinking glass')

Words of Spanish origin using /p/ in Jicarilla are the only instances where the /p/ or any other labial obstruent did not descend from a sonorant.

- /ɲ/ → /j/ with nasalization of following corresponding vowel

Báayoo (from paño 'scarf')

- Syllable final /l/ turns into /ɬ/ in words of Spanish origin in Jicarilla even though /l/ is a possible coda in Jicarilla. See:

Bíił (from automóvil 'automobile')

Bołdóon (from bulto 'small haystack')

Gołjóon (from colchón 'mattress')

(Observations from entries in Pono, et al., p. 9-16)

== See also ==
- Southern Apache Museum

== Bibliography ==
- Goddard, Pliny E. (1911). Jicarilla Apache texts. Anthropological papers of the American Museum of Natural History. Vol. 8. New York: The American Museum of Natural History. LCCN 15003021.
- Opler, Morris (1938). Myths and tales of the Jicarilla Apache Indians. New York: The American Folk-Lore Society. LCCN 38022477. OCLC 2341647.
- Opler, Morris (January–June 1941). "A Jicarilla expedition and scalp dance". The Journal of American Folklore. 54 (211–212). Narrated by Alasco Tisnado: 10–23. doi:10.2307/535798. JSTOR 535798.
- Opler, Morris Edward (April–June 1947). "Mythology and folk belief in the maintenance of Jicarilla Apache tribal endogamy". The Journal of American Folklore. 60 (236): 126–129. doi:10.2307/536694. JSTOR 536694.
- Phone, Wilma; Torivio, Patricia (1981). Jicarilla mizaa medaóołkai dáłáéé. Albuquerque: Native American Materials Development Center.
- Phone, Wilhelmina; Olson, Maureen; Martinez, Matilda (2007). Axelrod, Melissa; Gómez de García, Jule; Lachler, Jordan; Burke, Sean M. (eds.). Dictionary of Jicarilla Apache: Abáachi Mizaa Iłkee' Siijai. University of New Mexico Press. ISBN 978-0-8263-4078-8.
- Pono, Filomena P.; Vincenti, Arnold; Phone, Wilma (1976). Spanish Words in the Jicarilla Language (PDF). Loveland, CO: Center for In-Service Education.
- Tuttle, Siri G.; Sandoval, Merton (2002). "Jicarilla Apache". Journal of the International Phonetic Association. 32: 105–112. doi:10.1017/S0025100302000191.
- Tuttle, Siri G. (2005). "Duration, Intonation and Prominence in Apache". In Hargus, Sharon; Rice, Keren (eds.). Athabaskan Prosody. Current Issues in Linguistic Theory. Vol. 269. pp. 331–344. doi:10.1075/cilt.269.19tut. ISBN 978-90-272-4783-4.
- Wilson, Alan; Vigil Martine, Rita (1996). Apache (Jicarilla). Guilford, CT: Audio-Forum. ISBN 0-88432-903-8. (Includes book and cassette recording).
