= Plains Apache =

Native American tribe in southwest Oklahoma

Apache Tribe of Oklahoma Plains Apache
Ná'ishą, Ka-ta-kas
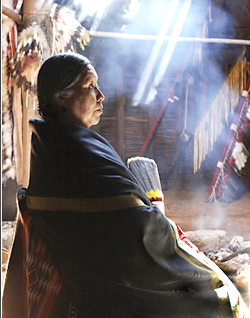
- Vanessa Jennings, a Plains Apache/Kiowa/Gila River Pima artist and traditionalist

Total population
- 2,263

Regions with significant populations
- United States (Oklahoma)

Languages
- English, formerly Plains Apache language

Religion
- Indigenous religion, Native American Church, Christianity

Related ethnic groups
- fellow Apache, Navajo, and Tsuutʼina

The Plains Apache are a small Southern Athabaskan tribe who live on the Southern Plains of North America, in close association with the linguistically unrelated Kiowa Tribe. Today, they are headquartered in Southwestern Oklahoma and are federally recognized as the Apache Tribe of Oklahoma. They mostly live in Comanche and Caddo County, Oklahoma.

== Name ==
Their autonym is Ná'ishą, or "takers" based on their skill at stealing horses, or Naishadena, meaning "our people." This is also written Na-i-shan Dine.

They were also called Káłt'inde or γát dìndé meaning "cedar people" or Bek'áhe meaning "whetstone people".

The Plains Apache are also known as the Kiowa Apache. To their Kiowa allies, who speak an unrelated language, the Plains Apache are known as Semat.

== Government ==
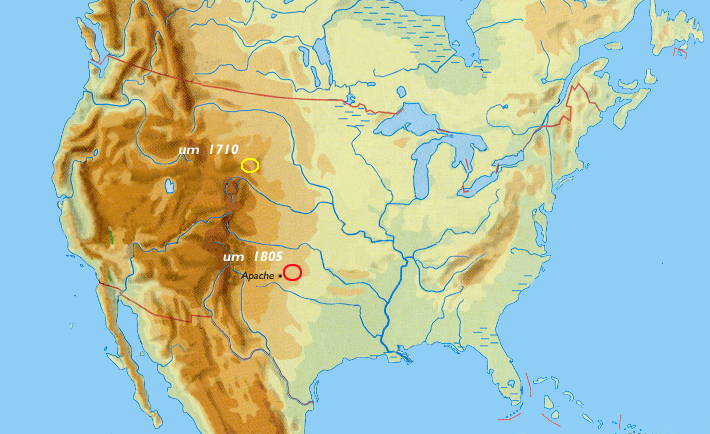
Location of Plains Apache lands

Map of Apache Tribe of Oklahoma's tribal jurisdictional area (OTSA) and nearby jurisdiction areas. Shared with Kiowa Tribe, Comanche Nation and Fort Sill Apache Tribe of Oklahoma.

Today the tribe is headquartered in Anadarko, Oklahoma. Their tribal jurisdictional area covers parts of Caddo, Comanche, Cotton, Greer, Jackson, Kiowa, Tillman and Harmon Counties in Oklahoma.

In 2011, the tribe had 2,263 total citizens, of whom 1,814 lived in-state. Tribal enrollment is based on 1/8 blood quantum, meaning a person must be able to prove they have at least 1/8 Native American ancestry to be considered eligible for tribal enrollment.

As of 2025, the current administration is:

- Chairman: Durell Cooper
- Vice Chairman: Matthew Tselee
- Secretary/Treasurer: Ruth Bert
- Committee Member: Donald Komardley
- Committee Member: Dustin Cozad

In addition to the Apache Business Committee outlined above, the tribe also operates the following tribal departments:

- AOA (Administration on Aging)
  - Director: Billy Harris
- Housing Authority of the Apache Tribe
  - Director: Ronald Twohatchet
- Child Welfare
- EPA (Environmental Program)
  - Director: Wamblee Smith
- Finance
  - Director: Wendy Whiteshield
- Food Distribution
  - Director: Jennifer Boynton
- Human Resources
  - Director: Tamara Paukei
- Procurement Director:
  - Joann Belgarde
- Social Services
  - Supervisory Social Worker: Sallie Allen
- Tax Commission Tax Clerk: Sandy Jay
- Vocational Rehab
  - Director: Tanner Mahseet
- CHR (Community Health Rep)
  - Director: Antionette Short
- (Violence Against Indian Women)
- Apache Tribal Enrollment
  - Director: Lisa Bower VAIW

== Economic Development ==
The Apache Tribe of Oklahoma owns and operates the Apache Golden Eagle Casino in Apache, Oklahoma. The Golden Eagle Casino was previously closed in 2013 due to a tribal dispute, along with the Silver Buffalo Casino in Anadarko, Oklahoma. Only the Golden Eagle Casino reopened once the dispute was settled. The casino is under the jurisdiction of the Apache Gaming Commission, headed by Gaming Commissioner Ryan Adudell. There is also a smokeshop and a gas station on the reservation.

The tribe issues their own tribal license plates through the Tax Commission.

== History ==
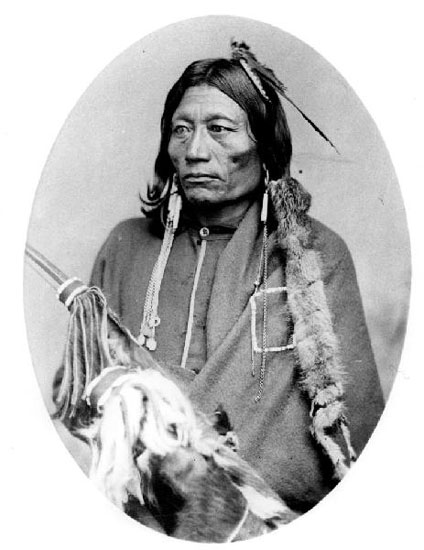
Essa-queta, Plains Apache chief

Their oral history states that the Plains Apache broke away from the Tsuutʼina, an Athabascan people who moved onto the Great Plains in Alberta, Canada. They have lived on the Great Plains since the 16th century. They migrated south, where the Lakota gave them territory south of the Black Hills in what became South Dakota and Wyoming.

The Apache are associated with the Dismal River culture (ca. 1650–1750) of the western Plains, generally attributed to the Paloma and Cuartelejo Apaches. Jicarilla Apache pottery has also been found in some of the Dismal River complex sites. Some of the people from the Dismal River culture joined the Plains Apache in the Black Hills.

=== 18th century ===
Due to pressure from the Comanche from the west and Pawnee and French from the east, the Kiowa and remaining people of Dismal River culture migrated south where they later joined the Lipan Apache and Jicarilla Apache nations.

In the early 18th century, the Plains Apache lived around the upper Missouri River and maintained close connections to the Kiowa. They were ethnically different and spoke different languages. They communicated with their allies using the sophisticated Plains Indian Sign Language.

The Plains Apache continued migrating south along the eastern Rocky Mountains and hunting bison. They allied with the Pawnee, Arapaho, and Kiowa.

Even before contact with Europeans, their numbers were never large, and their 1780 population was estimated at 400.

=== 19th century ===
The Plains Apache and Kiowa had migrated into the Southern Plains sometime around 1800. The Treaty of Medicine Lodge in 1867 established an Indian Reservation for the Kiowa, Plains Apache, and Comanche in Western Oklahoma. They were forced to move south of the Washita River to the Red River and Western Oklahoma with the Comanche and the Kiowa. The 1890 Census showed 1,598 Comanche at the Fort Sill reservation, which they shared with 1,140 Kiowa and 326 Plains Apache.

Some groups of Plains Apache refused to settle on reservations and were involved in Kiowa and Comanche uprisings, most notably the First Battle of Adobe Walls which was the largest battle of the Indian Wars. It would be the last battle in which the Natives repelled the U.S. Army in the Southern Plains.

The Kiowa-Comanche-Apache (KCA) Reservation was broken up into individual allotments under the 1889 Springer Amendment to the Indian Appropriations Act.

=== 20th century ===
The so-called "surplus" lands of the KCA Reservation were opened up to white settlement in 1901. The U.S. federal government took more KCA lands in 1906. Despite tribal opposition to the land sessions, the U.S. courts upheld allotment. Most Plains Apache families chose land north of the Wichita Mountains.

In 1966, the tribe organized a business committee and regained federal recognition. In 1972, the Kiowa, Comanche, and Plains Apache legally separated.

== Social organization ==
The Plains Apache social organization is split into numerous extended families (kustcrae), who camped together (for hunting and gathering) as local groups (gonka). The next level was the division or band, a grouping of several gonkas (who would come together, for mutual protection, especially in times of war).

In pre-reservation times there were at least four local groups or gonkas who frequently joined together for warring neighboring tribes and settlements.

Historically, the tribe was led by an elder council, chiefs, medicine men, and warriors. Women controlled and maintained family belongings, including tipis. Skilled artists joined women's societies.

== Language ==
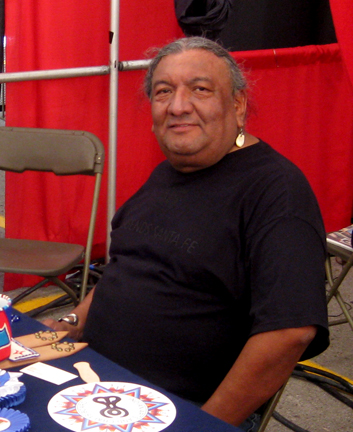
Richard Aitson, poet and award-winning beadworker, was both Kiowa and Plains Apache

The Plains Apache language is a member of the Southern Athabaskan language family, a division of the Na-Dene languages. The Plains Apache language, also referred to as Plains Apache, was the most divergent member of the subfamily. While three people spoke the language in 2006, the last fluent speaker died in 2008.

== Historical chiefs ==
- Gonkon (Gonkan – "Stays in Tipi" or "Defends His Tipi", also known as "Apache John"). A shortened form of his full name Gon-kon-chey-has-tay-yah (Man Over His Camp).
- Tsayaditl-ti (Ta-Ka-I-Tai-Di or Da-Kana-Dit-Ta-I – "White Man", ca. *1830 – ca. †1900)
- Koon-Ka-Zachey (Kootz-Zah). A shortened form of his full name Gon-kon-chey-has-tay-yah (Man Over His Camp).
- Essa-queta (better known as Pacer or Peso, derived from Pay-Sus, ca. *unknown – † 1875, Pacer was the leader of the Kiowa Apache tribe. Actually, Pacer was part of the peace faction and kept the main group of Plains Apaches on the reservation during the Red River War of 1874–75)
- Si-tah-le ("Poor Wolf")
- Oh-ah-te-kah ("Poor Bear")
- Ah-zaah ("Prairie Wolf")

== Notable tribal citizens ==
- Vanessa Jennings, Plains Apache/Kiowa/Pima beadwork artist and regalia-maker

== See also ==
- Apache
- Classification of Indigenous peoples of the Americas

== Bibliography ==
- Beatty, John. 1974. Kiowa-Apache Music and Dance. Occasional Publications in Anthropology: Ethnology Series. Number 31. Greeley, CO: Northern Colorado UP.
- Bittle, William. 1954. “The Peyote Ritual of the Plains Apache.” Oklahoma Anthropological Society. 2: 69-79.
- ______. 1962. “The Manatidie: A Focus for Plains Apache Tribal Identity.” Plains Anthropologist. 7(17): 152-163.
- ______. 1963. “Kiowa-Apache.” In Studies in the Athapaskan Languages. (Ed. Hoijer, Harry). University of California Studies in Linguistics vol. 29. Berkeley: California UP. 76-101.
- ______. 1964. “Six Plains Apache Tales.” Oklahoma Papers in Anthropology. 5:8-12.
- ______. 1971. “A Brief History of the Plains Apache.” Oklahoma Papers in Anthropology. 12(1): 1-34.
- ______. 1979. “Plains Apache Raiding Behavior.” Oklahoma Papers in Anthropology. 20(2): 33-47.
- Brant, Charles S. 1949. “The cultural position of the Kiowa-Apache.” Southwestern Journal of Anthropology. 5(1): 56-61.
- Brant, Charles S. 1950. “Peyotism among the Kiowa-Apache and Neighboring Tribes.” Southwestern Journal of Anthropology. 6(2): 212-222.
- Brant, Charles S. 1953. “Kiowa-Apache Culture History: Some Further Observations.” Southwestern Journal of Anthropology. 9(2): 195-202.
- Brant, Charles S. 1969. Jim Whitewolf: The Life of a Plains Apache. New York: Dover Publications.
- Jordan, Julia A. 2008 Plains Apache Ethnobotany. University of Oklahoma Press.
- McAllister, J. Gilbert. 1937. “Kiowa-Apache Social Organization.” In Social Anthropology of North American Tribes. (ed. Eggan, Fred). Chicago: Chicago UP.99-169.
- _______.1949. “Plains Apache Tales.” In The Sky is My Tipi. (ed. Boatright, Mody). Dallas: SMU Press. 1-141.
- _______.1970. Dävéko: Kiowa-Apache Medicine Man. Austin: Bulletin of the Texas Memorial Museum, No. 17.
- Meadows, William C. 1999. Kiowa, Apache, and Comanche Military Societies. University of Texas Press, Austin.
- Opler, Morris E. (1969). Western Apache and Plains Apache materials relating to ceremonial payment. Ethnology, 8 (1), 122-124.
- Opler, Morris E; & Bittle, William E. (1961). The death practices and eschatology of the Plains Apache. Southwestern Journal of Anthropology, 17 (4), 383-394.
- Schweinfurth, Kay Parker. (2002). Prayer on top of the earth: The spiritual universe of the Plains Apaches. Boulder: University Press of Colorado.
