= Lipan Apache people =

Native American ethnic group

Lipan Apache
Total population
- U.S. Census: 1,077 (2010), self-identified 100 (SIL 1977)

Regions with significant populations
- United States: New Mexico, Oklahoma, Texas
- Mexico: Coahuila

Languages
- English, Spanish, Lipan Apache

Related ethnic groups
- other Apache peoples

Lipan Apache are a band of Apache, a Southern Athabaskan Indigenous people, who have lived in the Southwest and Southern Plains for centuries. At the time of European and African contact, they lived in New Mexico, Colorado, Oklahoma, Texas, and northern Mexico. Historically, they were the easternmost band of Apache.

The descendants of the Lipan Apache live primarily in Texas, New Mexico, Oklahoma, Arizona, and northern Mexico. Some are enrolled in three federally recognized tribes: the Mescalero Apache Tribe in New Mexico, the Tonkawa Tribe of Indians of Oklahoma, and Apache Tribe of Oklahoma, which is also known as the Kiowa Apache or Plains Apache. The Lipan Apache, however, are not a federally recognized tribe. Additionally, Lipan Apache descendants are members of non-federally recognized groups.

== Name ==
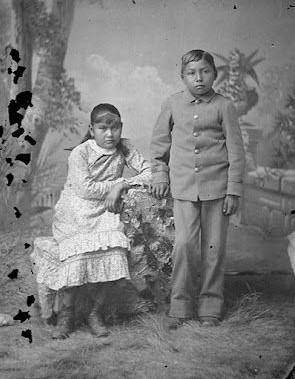
Two Lipan Apache children, Kesetta Roosevelt (d. c. 1906) and Jack Mather (d. 1888) from New Mexico, at Carlisle Indian School, c. 1885.

The name "Lipan" is a Spanish adaption of their self-designation as Łibaį́ Ndé or Lébai-Ndé ("Light Gray People"), reflecting their migratory story. The earliest known written record of the Lipan Apache identified this tribe as Ypandes.

Nancy McGown Minor wrote that the word Lipan stems from the Lipan words Łibaį́, which means 'gray', and ndé, which means 'people', which would make Lipan mean 'The Light Gray People'. The name Apache may be of Zuni origin, coming from the word apachu, which means 'enemy', or perhaps from the Ute, who referred to this group as Awa'tehe.

Apaches' autonym is Inde or Nde, meaning "the people."

The terms Eastern Apache and Texas Apache can also include them as well as the Chiricahua and Mescalero. I Fought a Good Fight: A History of the Lipan Apaches notes that Spanish explorers recorded their encounters with the Chipaines, Conejeros, Rio Colorados, and Anchos living along the Canadian River, who were ancestors of the Lipan.

== Language ==
Lipan Apache is a Southern Athabaskan language, considered to be closely related to the Jicarilla Apache language. Linguist Harry Hoijer noted that in 1938, the Lipan people in South Texas spoke a Southern Athapaskan language. As of 2009, there may be no remaining speakers, and the language is considered almost extinct or dormant. By 1981, only two or three elderly speakers of Lipan remained on the Mescalero Apache Reservation. There are ongoing efforts and funding aimed to revitalize the language.

== History ==
Confederated eastern Apache bands had a homeland that spanned from the Southern Great Plains to the Gulf of Mexico, with significant presence in what is now Texas. While there is little archeological evidence of the Lipan Apache, some pictographs in Paint Rock, Texas–located in Concho County–depict the Lipan's stories of emergence, sacred ceremonies, monsters, and mythic heroes. These pictographs span 12,000 years and may have contributions from as many as 300 tribes. The nomadic Lipan Apache, Jumanos, Tonkawa, and Comanche peoples inhabited the Concho Valley and are believed to have contributed to the drawings found at the pictograph site. Pictographs depicting a structure featuring crosses and a devil may relate to the mission and are believed to have been created by the Lipan.

=== 16th and 17th centuries ===
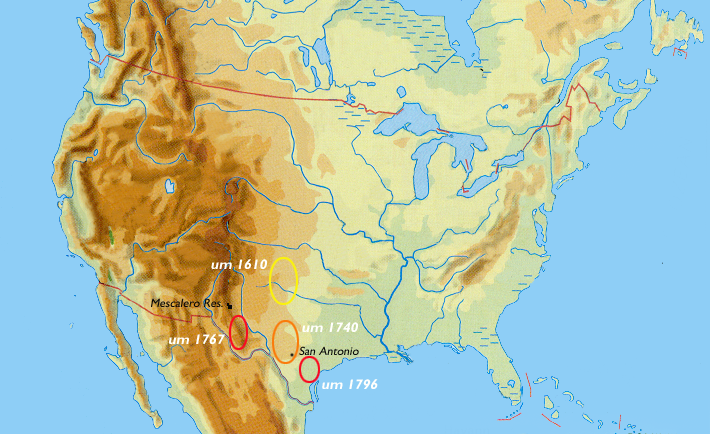
Map with locations of Lipan Apache territory in the 17th and 18th centuries

Ancestors of the Lipan Apache living along the Canadian River made the first known European contact during the Expedition of Francisco Vásquez de Coronado, who traveled there in 1541, and were still in the region when Diego de Vargas arrived in 1694. Historians believe the Teya Indians of the Texas Panhandle likely merged into the Lipan.

Lipan Apache obtained horses from the Spanish by 1608 and adopted a nomadic lifestyle. They were excellent horsemen and freely raided settlements. Throughout the 17th century, Spaniards raided Apache communities for slaves. The Acho, a branch of Lipan, fought with Taos Pueblo and Picuris Pueblo people against the Spanish in the 1680 Pueblo Revolt.

In 1684, Spanish colonists completed the Mission San Francisco de los Julimes near Presidio, Texas, to serve Jumano, Julime, and neighboring tribes. These tribes taught the peyote ceremony to the Tonkawa and Lipan, who in turn, shared it with the Comanches, Mescalero Apaches, and Plains Apaches. In the 1860s, Spanish chroniclers wrote that some Lipan Apache lived near the Gulf Coast and adopted lifeways of the neighboring Karankawa.

=== 18th century ===
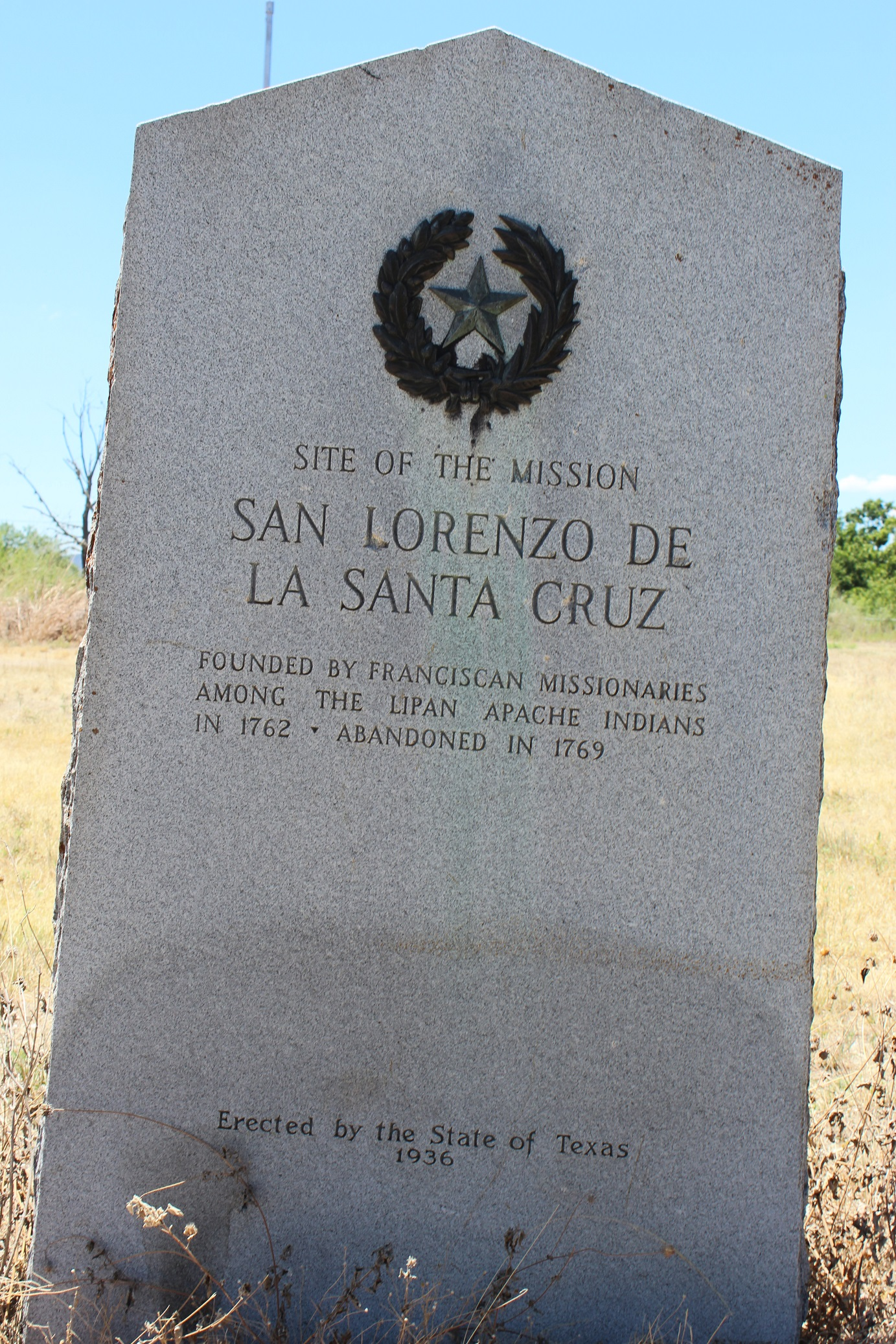
Historic marker for Mission San Lorenzo de la Santa Cruz, founded by Franciscan missionaries among the Lipan Apache Indians in 1762. Abandoned in 1769

By 1700, Lipan had settled across southern Texas and into Coahuila, Mexico. They still lived in agricultural settlements, where they farmed indigenous crops such as pumpkins, corn, and beans, as well as watermelons, introduced from Africa. French explorer Bénard de La Harpe encountered the Lipan Apache near present-day Latimer County, Oklahoma, in 1719.

The Lipan were first mentioned in Spanish records in 1718 when they raided Spanish settlements in San Antonio. They frequently raided Spanish supply trains traveling from Coahuila to the newly established San Antonio.

In 1749, two Lipan Apache chiefs joined other Apache leaders in signing one of the earliest recorded peace treaties with Spain in San Antonio. Some Lipan Apache people settled northwest of San Antonio during the mid-18th century.

Spanish colonists built forts and missions near Lipan settlements. A mission on the San Sabá River was completed in 1757 but destroyed by the Comanche and the Wichita. That same year, the Lipan Apache fought the Hasinais, a band of Caddo people. The Lipan participated in a Spanish expedition against the Wichita and Comanche in 1759 but were defeated in the Battle of the Twin Villages. Missions established for the Lipan at Candelaria and San Lorenzo were destroyed by the Comanche in 1767.

By 1767, all Lipan had completely deserted the Spanish missions. In the same year, Marquis of Rubí started a policy of Lipan extermination after a 1764 smallpox epidemic had decimated the tribe.

=== 19th century ===
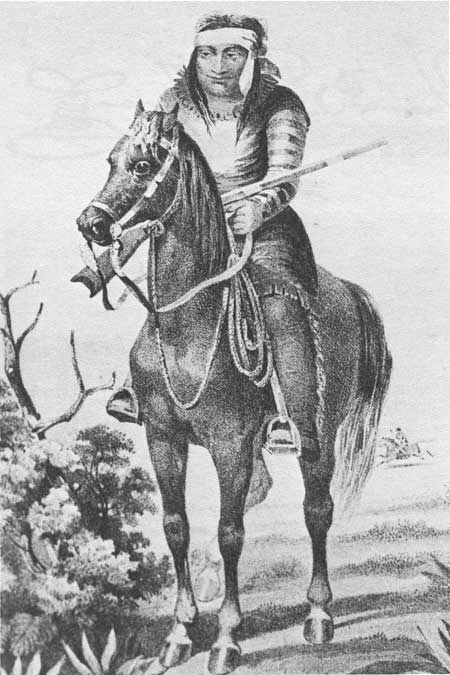
Illustration of a Lipan Apache warrior, 1857

In the early 19th century, Lipan Apache primarily lived in south and west Texas, south of the Colorado River to the Gulf of Mexico and east to the Rio Grande. They were allied to the Tonkawa beginning in this century. To resist their enemies the Comanche and the Mexicans, the Lipan Apache allied with the Republic of Texas in the 1830s. They served as scouts to the Texas Militia during the Texas Revolution of 1835–36.

The State of Texas owned massive war debts and used land sales to raise funds following statehood, leaving almost no land to American Indians. Texas established the Brazos Reservation in 1854, where around 2,000 members of the Caddo, Anadarko, Waco, and Tonkawa tribes, but then the tribes to relocate to Indian Territory by 1859.

In 1855, some Lipan Apache joined the Brazos Reservation; however, most did not. Some joined the Plains Apache in Oklahoma; others joined the Mescalero in New Mexico, and others fled to Mexico.

In 1869, Mexican troops from Monterrey were brought to Zaragosa to eliminate the Lipan Apache, who were blamed for inciting conflict. Chief Magoosh (Lipan, ca. 1830–1900) led his band from Texas and joined the Mescalero Apache on the Mescalero Reservation in 1870. Troops attacked many Lipan camps; survivors fled to the Mescaleros in New Mexico. From 1875 to 1876, United States Army troops undertook joint military campaigns with the Mexican Army to eliminate the Lipan from the state of Coahuila in northern Mexico. In 1879, a group of 17 Lipan settled near Fort Griffin, Texas, but in 1884 they were forcibly removed to Indian Territory, where they joined the Tonkawa.

In 1891, the Lipans negotiated with President of Mexico Porfirio Diaz to preserve the Lipan’s tribal land in Zaragosa. This agreement lasted about 12 years until they were displaced from Zaragosa after resisting joining the Mexican Army.

=== 20th century ===
In October 1903, 19 Lipan Apaches who fled Texas into Coahuila were taken to northwest Chihuahua and kept as prisoners of war until 1905. They were released to the Mescalero Reservation.

== Bands ==
The Lipan Apache emerged from an amalgamation of several Eastern Apache bands united within a large confederacy and who shared a cultural and historic bond. As a confederacy, they united to defend against the Comanche and their allies. By about 1720, the Comanche drove the Lipan Apache from the southern Great Plains. By the early 18th century, the Lipan were divided into regional groupings/divisions comprising several bands - the Forest Lipan division (Lower Lipan bands), the Plains Lipan division (Upper Lipan bands), and bands who lived primarily in northern Mexico (Mexican Lipan bands).

=== Lower Lipan bands; Forest Lipan division ===
- Red Hair People (Tséral tuétahäⁿ): absorbed later into the Sun Otter band or the Green Mountain band, lived south of the Nueces River in Texas, no longer existed in 1884.
- Sun Otter band (Tcheshä’ⁿ): ranged from San Antonio, Texas, south to the Rio Grande.
- Green Mountain band (Tsél tátlidshäⁿ): absorbed later by the High-Beaked Moccasin band, lived in the lower Texas Gulf Plains along the lower Colorado, Guadalupe and Nueces Rivers.
- High-Beaked Moccasin band (Kóke metcheskó lähäⁿ): lived south of San Antonio as far as northern Mexico.
- Tall Grass band (Cuelcahende): lived from southwestern Kansas to northeastern Durango.
- Heads of Wolves People (Tsés tsembai): lived above the Colorado River, possibly in the Lubbock area. May represent an early Lipan presence in north Texas before the Commanche moved in.
- Trees Tall Standing People (Tcic n’ti óané) & Red Mud People (Gocłic Łit’xuné): merged to form the Canneci Tinné, the easternmost band of Apache, whose territory includes present-day St. Martin & Lafayette parishes in Louisiana. The Canneci were noted as early as 1700 by Jean-Baptiste LeMoyne, Sieur de Bienville

=== Upper Lipan / Plains Lipan division ===
- Fire or Camp Circle band (Ndáwe ɣóhäⁿ): lived west to southwest of Fort Griffin, from the San Saba River to the Rio Grande River.
- Pulverizing or Rubbing band (Tchóⁿ kanäⁿ): absorbed later by the Little Breech-clout band, lived west of Fort Griffin, Texas, to the western side of the Rio Grande, believed extinct by 1884.
- Little Breech-clout band (Tchaⁿshka ózhäyeⁿ): lived along the lower Pecos River in Texas.
- Uplander band (Täzhä'ⁿ): lived along the upper Rio Grande in southern New Mexico but would migrate to the upper Nueces River in Texas to hunt buffalo.
- Prairie Men (Kó'l kukä'ⁿ): known as the Llaneros by the late 18th century, lived west of Ft. Griffin along the upper Colorado and Concho Rivers and ranged to west of the Pecos River.
- Wild Goose Band (Teł kóndahäⁿ): possibly absorbed by the Prairie Man band in the late 18th century, lived along the upper Colorado River west of Fort Griffin in Texas, were renowned and fierce warriors.
- North Band (Shä-äⁿ): lived in the mid-19th century in northwestern Texas in territory inhabited by the Kiowa Apache.

Mexican Lipan bands

- Big Water band (Kú’ne tsá): in the mid-18th century, this band broke from their kin in San Antonio and moved into northern Coahuila near Zaragos, lived along the Escondido and San Rodrigo Rivers and in the Santa Rosa and Sierra El Burro Mountains of Mexico.
- Painted Wood People (Tsésh ke shénde or Tséc kecénde): lived in Lavón, Coahuila, Mexico, between Zaragosa and Morelos, believed extinct by 1884.

The Spanish associated these groupings with the Lipan:

- Lipiyánes: a coalition of Lipans, Nastagés, and other Lipans who lived along the Pecos, joined together by 1780 under the leadership of Picax-Ande-Ins-Tinsle (Strong Arm), to battle the Comanche’s southern expansion.
- Natagés (Mescal People): culturally affiliated with the Mescalero Apache, lived along the Pecos River and were strong allies of the Lipan Apaches.
- Pelones (Bald/Hairless Ones): name given to the Forest Lipan division by the Spaniards probably in reference to Lipan custom of plucking facial hair, lived in the upper Brazos area along the Red River of north-central Texas.

== Population ==
Ethnographer James Mooney estimated that there were 500 Lipan Apache in 1690. Missionary priest Friar Diego Ximenez estimated the Lipan population to total 5,000 in 1762, 3,000 in 1763, and 4,000 in 1764. In 1778, Spanish military commanders meeting in Monclova, Coahuila, estimated the population of Lipan men to be 5,000. By 1820, Mexican government official Juan Padilla estimated that there were 700 Lipans in Texas. Opler and Ray estimated that the Lipan population between 1845-1855 ranged from 500 to 1000. The 1910 U.S. census lists 28 Lipan Apache people.

== 21st century ==
Lipan Apache descendants are enrolled in three federally recognized tribes:

- Mescalero Apache Tribe in New Mexico
- Tonkawa Tribe in Oklahoma
- Apache Tribe of Oklahoma

The Lipan Apache do not have their own distinct federally recognized tribe.

Several non-federally recognized tribes in Texas and Louisiana assert Lipan Apache heritage. These include the following.

=== Louisiana ===
- Choctaw-Apache Tribe of Ebarb, also known as the Choctaw-Apache Community of Ebarb, in Zwolle, Louisiana
- Canneci Tinné Apache Tribe, in Carencro, Louisiana

The State of Louisiana recognized the Choctaw-Apache Community of Ebarb by legislative action, House Concurrent Resolution 2, in 1978.

=== Texas ===
1. Apache Council of Texas in Alice, Texas
2. Cuelgahen Nde Lipan Apache of Texas in Three Rivers, Texas
3. Lipan Apache Band of Texas in Brackettville, Texas.
4. Lipan Apache Nation of Texas, also known as the Kuné Tsa Nde Band of the Lipan Apache Nation of Texas, in San Antonio, Texas
5. Lipan Apache Tribe of Bracketville Texas, Bracketville, TX
6. Lipan Apache Tribe of Texas in McAllen, Texas

Although Texas currently has "no legal mechanism to recognize tribes"; state recognition can occur through various means, including state law, administrative actions, legislation, and gubernatorial proclamations or executive orders, but most often through legislation. On March 18, 2009, Senate Resolution 438 and House Resolution 812, both titled "Recognizing the Lipan Apache Tribe of Texas," were passed by their respective chambers during the 81st Texas Legislative Session. These jointly issued congratulatory resolutions expressed the sentiments of both chambers in acknowledging the Lipan Apache Tribe of Texas as a historical tribe and commended the tribe's contributions to the state. In 2019, State of Texas 86th Legislature, adopted concurrent resolutions, Senate Concurrent Resolution No. 61 and House Concurrent Resolution No. 171, that affirmed the Texas Legislature's views that the Lipan Apache Tribe of Texas was "the present-day incarnation of a proud people who have lived in Texas and northern Mexico for more than 300 years". The resolutions also commended the Tribe for its valuable contributions to the state. The Senate, House, and the Governor signed each concurrent resolution.

Texas senate bills for formal state recognition of the Lipan Apache Tribe of Texas were introduced in 2021 and in 2022. Both bills died in committee.

The Lipan Apache Band of Texas was honored by the Texas state legislator in 2011 through House Resolution 540.

In December 2024, the Choctaw-Apache Community of Ebarb and the Lipan Apache Tribe of Texas were registered members of the National Congress of American Indians (NCAI) as state-recognized tribe tribes. NCAI requires annual registration with membership dues.

== Notable Lipan Apache chiefs ==
Below are historical chiefs with estimated times of when they were active.

- Bigotes (lit. 'Mustached One') (middle of the 18th century): In 1751, he left Texas and crossed the Rio Grande into Coahuila. About this date, they lived along the Rio Escondido and Rio San Rodrigo in Coahuila.
- Poca Ropa (lit. 'few or scant clothes') (c. 1750 – c. 1790) was Chief of the Little Breech-clout band along the lower Pecos River
- Cavezon/el Gran Cavezon (lit. 'The Big Head'): c. 1760 – c. 1790) was Chief of the Fire/Camp Circla band, lived along the San Saba River towards the upper Nueces River.
- Yolcha/Yolcna Pocarropa (c. 1822 – c. 1828) was Chief of several bands of the Littel Breech-clout band in western Texas, grandson of Poca Ropa. He was allied with Cuelgas de Castro. He moved his band from the lower Pecos River area in West Texas to the Laredo and lower Rio Grande region in late 1820s.
- Cuelgas de Castro (c. 1821 – c. 1842) was Chief of the Sun Otter band in the territory of San Antonio across the Rio Grande in Tamaulipas and played a large role in interactions between the Republic of Texas and the Lipan Apache. He was an ally of chiefs Flacco and Yolcha Pocarropa.
- Flacco (c. 1821 – c. 1843) was Chief of the High-Beaked Moccasin band east of San Antonio who had a history of aiding Texas Militian units. He was a friend of President of the Republic of Texas Sam Houston.
- Magoosh (Ma’uish): c. 1850 – 1900) was Chief of the Sun Otter band in southeastern Texas. Because of a severe epidemic, one part of this band went to Zaragosa in Coahuila, while the other part of Magoosh's band took refuge by the Mescalero and accompanied them in 1870 onto the Mescalero Reservation.
