= Instituto Nacional de Lenguas Indígenas =

Mexican government agency protecting indigenous languages

The Instituto Nacional de Lenguas Indígenas (English: National Indigenous Languages Institute) better known by its acronym INALI, is a Mexican federal public agency, created 13 March 2003 by the enactment of the Ley General de Derechos Lingüísticos de los Pueblos Indígenas (General Law of Indigenous Peoples' Linguistic Rights) by the administration of President Vicente Fox Quesada.

It is a decentralized agency of the Federal Public Administration, attached to the Secretariat of Public Education (Secretaría de Educación Pública, or SEP). Its supreme organ is the National Council, of which the Secretary of Public Education serves as president, with a Director General in charge of its day-to-day activities.

INALI works to promote and protect the use of Mexico's indigenous languages, which it divides into 68 living "linguistic groups" and hundreds of "linguistic varieties". While many of the "groups" have traditionally been considered single languages, INALI recommends that the "varieties" be considered as separate languages in all matters of justice, education, health, and civil administration or information. One of INALI's main tasks is to prevent the disappearance and extinction of indigenous languages that have survived from pre-Hispanic times.
