= Apache =

Indigenous peoples of the United States

Total population
- 194,715 (self-identified)

Regions with significant populations
- Southwest United States (Arizona, New Mexico, Colorado, Texas, Oklahoma) and Northern Mexico (Sonora, Coahuila, Chihuahua and Tamaulipas); Canada: 825 residents of Canada identified as having Apache ancestry in the 2016 Canadian census.

Languages
- Apache, Jicarilla, Plains Apache, Lipan Apache, Mescalero-Chiricahua, Western Apache, English, and Spanish

Religion
- Native American Church, Christianity, Indigenous religion

Related ethnic groups
- Navajo and other Athabascan language-speaking tribes

- People: Apache
- Language: Apache
- Country: Apachería

The Apache (/əˈpætʃi/ ə-PATCH-ee) are several Southern Athabaskan language-speaking peoples of the Southwest, the Southern Plains and Northern Mexico. They are linguistically related to the Navajo. They migrated from the Athabascan homelands in the north into the Southwest between 1000 and 1500 CE.

Apache bands include the Chiricahua, Jicarilla, Lipan, Mescalero, Mimbreño, Salinero, Plains, and Western Apache (Aravaipa, Pinaleño, Coyotero, and Tonto). Today, Apache tribes and reservations are headquartered in Arizona, New Mexico, Texas, and Oklahoma, while in Mexico the Apache are settled in Sonora, Chihuahua, Coahuila and areas of Tamaulipas. Each tribe is politically autonomous.

Historically, the Apache homelands have consisted of high mountains, sheltered and watered valleys, deep canyons, deserts, and the southern Great Plains, including areas in what is now Eastern Arizona, Northern Mexico (Sonora and Chihuahua) and New Mexico, West Texas, and Southern Colorado. These areas are collectively known as Apacheria.

The Apache tribes fought the invading Spanish and Mexican peoples for centuries. The first Apache raids on Sonora appear to have taken place during the late 17th century. In 19th-century confrontations during the American Indian Wars, the U.S. Army found the Apache to be fierce warriors and skillful strategists.

== Contemporary tribes ==
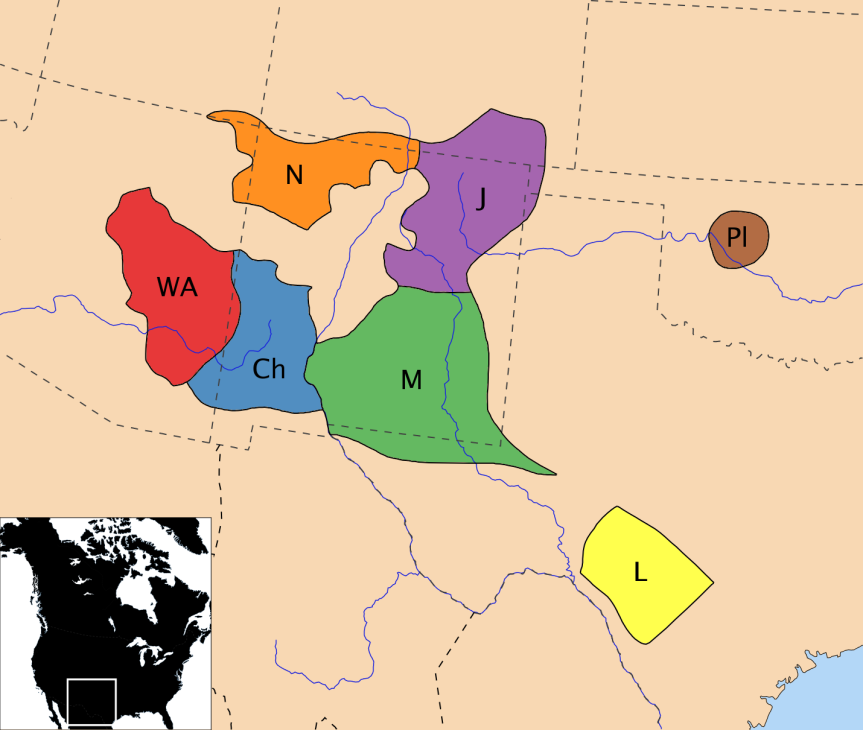
Southern Athabascan-speaking tribes, c. 18th century: WA: Western Apache; N: Navajo; Ch: Chiricahua; M: Mescalero; J: Jicarilla; L: Lipan; Pl: Plains Apache

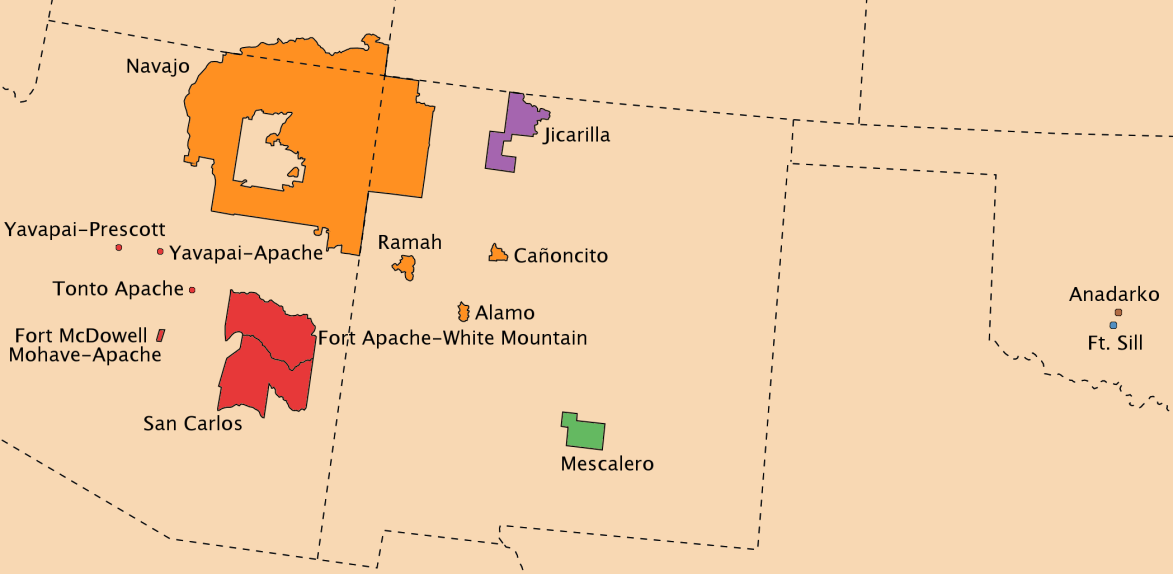
Present-day primary locations of Apache tribes and the Navajo Nation (scale and colors in map above)

Federally recognized Apache tribes are:

1. Apache Tribe of Oklahoma
2. Fort Sill Apache Tribe of Oklahoma, Oklahoma
3. Fort McDowell Yavapai Nation, Arizona
4. Jicarilla Apache Nation, New Mexico
5. Mescalero Apache Tribe of the Mescalero Reservation, New Mexico
6. San Carlos Apache Tribe of the San Carlos Reservation, Arizona
7. Tonto Apache Tribe of Arizona
8. White Mountain Apache Tribe of the Fort Apache Reservation, Arizona
9. Yavapai-Apache Nation of the Camp Verde Indian Reservation, Arizona

The Jicarilla are headquartered in Dulce, New Mexico, while the Mescalero are headquartered in Mescalero, New Mexico. The Western Apache, located in Arizona, is divided into several reservations, which crosscut cultural divisions. The Western Apache reservations include the Fort Apache Indian Reservation, San Carlos Apache Indian Reservation, Camp Verde Indian Reservation, and Tonto Apache Reservation.

The Chiricahua were divided into two groups after they were released from being prisoners of war. The majority moved to the Mescalero Reservation and formed, with the larger Mescalero political group, the Mescalero Apache Tribe of the Mescalero Reservation, along with the Lipan Apache. The other Chiricahua are enrolled in the Fort Sill Apache Tribe of Oklahoma, headquartered in Apache, Oklahoma.

The Plains Apache are located in Oklahoma, headquartered around Anadarko, and are federally recognized as the Apache Tribe of Oklahoma.

The nine Apache tribes formed a nonprofit organization, the Apache Alliance. Tribal leaders convene at the Apache Alliance Summits, meetings hosted by a different Apache tribe each time. The member tribes are the Apache Tribe of Oklahoma, Fort McDowell Yavapai Nation, Fort Sill Apache Tribe, Jicarilla Apache Tribe, Mescalero Apache Tribe, San Carlos Apache Tribe, Tonto Apache Tribe, White Mountain Apache Tribe, Yavapai-Apache Nation, In 2021, "Lipan Apaches were present" at the summit.

== Name ==
Apaches first encountered European and African people, when they met conquistadors from the Spanish Empire, and thus the term Apache has its roots in the Spanish language. The Spanish first used the term Apachu de Nabajo (Navajo) in the 1620s, referring to people in the Chama region east of the San Juan River. By the 1640s, they applied the term to Southern Athabaskan peoples from the Chama on the east to the San Juan on the west. The ultimate origin is uncertain and lost to Spanish history.

The first known written record in Spanish is by Juan de Oñate in 1598. The most widely accepted origin theory suggests Apache was borrowed and transliterated from the Zuni word ʔa·paču meaning "Navajos" (the plural of paču "Navajo"). (Note: Other Zuni words identifying specific Apache groups are wilacʔu·kʷe "White Mountain Apache" and čišše·kʷe "San Carlos Apache".) J. P. Harrington reports that čišše·kʷe can also be used to refer to the Apache in general.

Another theory suggests the term comes from Yavapai ʔpačə meaning "enemy". The Zuni and Yavapai sources are less certain because Oñate used the term before he had encountered any Zuni or Yavapai. A less likely origin may be from Spanish mapache, meaning "raccoon".

Modern Apache people use the Spanish term to refer to themselves and tribal functions, and so does the US government. However, Apache language speakers also refer to themselves and their people in the Apache term Indé meaning "person" or "people". A related Southern Athabascan–speaking tribe, the Navajo, refer to themselves as the Diné.

The fame of the tribes' tenacity and fighting skills, probably bolstered by dime novels, was widely known among Europeans. In early 20th century Parisian society, the word Apache was adopted into French, essentially meaning an outlaw.

The term Apachean includes the related Navajo people.

=== Difficulties in naming ===
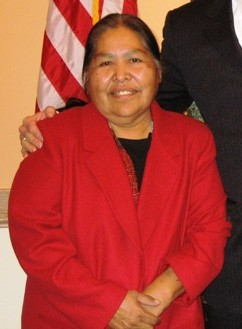
Kathy Kitcheyan, chairwoman of the San Carlos Apache

Many of the historical names of Apache groups that were recorded by non-Apache are difficult to match to modern-day tribes or their subgroups. Over the centuries, many Spanish, French and English-speaking authors did not differentiate between Apache and other semi-nomadic non-Apache peoples who might pass through the same area. Most commonly, Europeans learned to identify the tribes by translating their exonym, what another group whom the Europeans encountered first called the Apache peoples. Europeans often did not learn what the peoples called themselves, their autonyms.

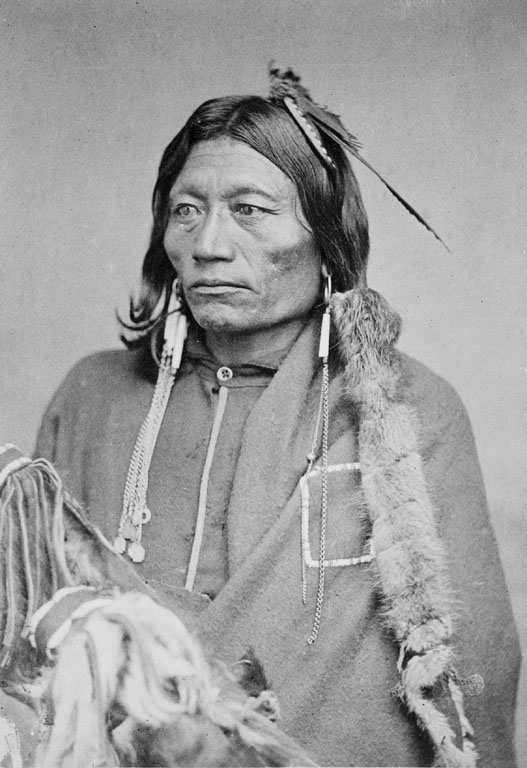
Essa-queta, Plains Apache chief

While anthropologists agree on some traditional major subgrouping of Apaches, they have often used different criteria to name finer divisions, and these do not always match modern Apache groupings. Some scholars do not consider groups residing in what is now Mexico to be Apache. In addition, an Apache individual has different ways of identification with a group, such as a band or clan, as well as the larger tribe or language grouping, which can add to the difficulties in an outsider comprehending the distinctions.

In 1900, the US government classified the members of the Apache tribe in the United States as Pinal Coyotero, Jicarilla, Mescalero, San Carlos, Tonto, and White Mountain Apache. The different groups were located in Arizona, New Mexico, and Oklahoma.

In the 1930s, the anthropologist Greenville Goodwin classified the Western Apache into five groups (based on his informants' views of dialect and cultural differences): White Mountain, Cibecue, San Carlos, North Tonto, and South Tonto. Since then, other anthropologists (e.g. Albert Schroeder) consider Goodwin's classification inconsistent with pre-reservation cultural divisions. Willem de Reuse finds linguistic evidence supporting only three major groupings: White Mountain, San Carlos, and Dilzhe'e (Tonto). He believes San Carlos is the most divergent dialect, and that Dilzhe'e is a remnant, intermediate member of a dialect continuum that previously spanned from the Western Apache language to the Navajo.

John Upton Terrell classifies the Apache into western and eastern groups. In the western group, he includes Toboso, Cholome, (Note: Alternate spellings include: Chilome, Chocolome, Chokone, Cholame, Chalome, Zolome.) Jocome, Sibolo or Cibola, Pelone, Manso, and Kiva or Kofa. He includes Chicame (the earlier term for Hispanized Chicano or New Mexicans of Spanish/Hispanic and Apache descent) among them as having definite Apache connections or names which the Spanish associated with the Apache.

In a detailed study of New Mexico Catholic Church records, David M. Brugge identifies 15 tribal names that the Spanish used to refer to the Apache. These were drawn from records of about 1,000 baptisms from 1704 to 1862.

== Tribes and bands ==
The list below is based on Foster and McCollough (2001), Opler (1983b, 1983c, 2001), and de Reuse (1983).

The term Apache refers to six major Apache-speaking groups: Chiricahua, Jicarilla, Lipan, Mescalero, Plains, and Western Apache. Historically, the term has also been applied to the Comanches, Mojaves, Hualapais, and Yavapais, none of whom speak Apache languages.

=== Chiricahua – Mimbreño – Ndendahe ===
- Chiricahua historically lived in Southeastern Arizona and Northern Sonora and Chihuahua. Chíshí (also Tchishi) is a Navajo word meaning "Chiricahua, southern Apaches in general".
  - Ch'úúkʾanén, true Chiricahua (Tsokanende, also Č'ók'ánéń, Č'ó·k'anén, Chokonni, Cho-kon-nen, Cho Kŭnĕ́, Chokonen) is the Eastern Chiricahua band identified by Morris Opler. The name is an autonym from the Chiricahua language.
  - Gileño (also Apaches de Gila, Apaches de Xila, Apaches de la Sierra de Gila, Xileños, Gilenas, Gilans, Gilanians, Gila Apache, Gilleños) referred to several different Apache and non-Apache groups at different times. Gila refers to either the Gila River or the Gila Mountains. Some of the Gila Apaches were probably later known as the Mogollon Apaches, a Central Apache sub-band, while others probably coalesced into the Chiricahua proper. But, since the term was used indiscriminately for all Apachean groups west of the Rio Grande (i.e. in southeast Arizona and western New Mexico), the reference in historical documents is often unclear. After 1722, Spanish documents start to distinguish between these different groups, in which case Apaches de Gila refers to the Western Apache living along the Gila River (synonymous with Coyotero). American writers first used the term to refer to the Mimbres (another Central Apache subdivision).
- Mimbreño are the Tchihende, not a Chiricahua band but a central Apache division sharing the same language with the Chiricahua and the Mescalero divisions, the name being referred to a central Apache division improperly considered as a section of Opler's "Eastern Chiricahua band", and to Albert Schroeder's Mimbres, or Warm Springs and Copper Mines "Chiricahua" bands in southwestern New Mexico.
  - Copper Mines Mimbreño (also Coppermine) were located on upper reaches of Gila River, New Mexico, having their center in the Pinos Altos area. (See also Gileño and Mimbreño.)
  - Warm Springs Mimbreño (also Warmspring) were located on upper reaches of Gila River, New Mexico, having their center in the Ojo Caliente area. (See also Gileño and Mimbreño.)
- Ndendahe were a division comprising the Bedonkohe (Mogollon) group and the Nedhni (Carrizaleño and Janero) group, incorrectly called, sometimes, Southern Chirichua.
  - Mogollon was considered by Schroeder to be a separate pre-reservation Chiricahua band, while Opler considered the Mogollon to be part of his Eastern Chiricahua band in New Mexico. This is not to be confused with the precontact Mogollon culture.
  - Nedhni were the most southern group of the Central Apache, having their center in the Carrizal (Carrizaleño) and Janos (Janero) areas, in the Mexican state of Chihuahua.

=== Jicarilla ===
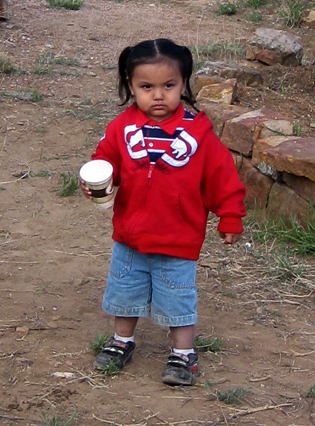
Young Jicarilla Apache boy, New Mexico, 2009

The Jicarilla primarily live in Northern New Mexico and Southern Colorado. The term jicarilla comes from the Spanish word for "little gourd."

- Carlana (Note: Alternate spellings include: Carlane, Carbame) (also Sierra Blanca) is Raton Mesa in Southeastern Colorado. In 1726, they joined the Cuartelejo and Paloma, and by the 1730s, they lived with the Jicarilla. The Llanero band of the Jicarilla or the Dáchizh-ó-zhn Jicarilla (defined by James Mooney) might be descendants of the Carlana, Cuartelejo, and Paloma. Parts of the group were called Lipiyanes or Llaneros. In 1812, the term Carlana was used to mean Jicarilla. The Flechas de Palo might have been a part of or absorbed by the Carlana (or Cuartelejo).

=== Lipan ===
Lipan (Ypandes) primarily live in New Mexico today on the Mescalero Apache Reservation. Other Lipan Apache descendants merged with the Tonkawa tribe in Oklahoma. Historically, they moved from what is now the Southwest into the Southern Plains before 1650. In 1719, French explorer Jean Baptiste Bénard de La Harpe encountered the Lipan Apache near what is now Latimer County, Oklahoma.

They were mentioned in 1718 records as being near the newly established town of San Antonio, Texas. They expanded into Texas and south the Gulf of Mexico and Rio Grande. In the mid-18th century, some Lipan settled in and near Spanish missions in Texas. Clashes with Comanche forced them into southern Texas and northern Mexico.

Briefly in the late 1830s, the Lipan allied with the Republic of Texas; however, after Texas gained statehood in 1846, the Americans waged a brutal campaign against the Lipan, destroying Lipan villages and trying to force them from Texas. Most were forced onto the Mescalero Reservation and some went to Oklahoma.

- Pelones ("Bald Ones") lived far from San Antonio and far to the northeast of the Ypandes near the Red River of the South of North-Central Texas, although able to field 800 warriors, more than the Ypandes and Natagés together, they were described as less warlike because they had fewer horses than the Plains Lipan, their population were estimated between 1,600 and 2,400 persons, were the Forest Lipan division (Chishį́į́hį́į́, Tcici, Tcicihi – "People of the Forest", after 1760 the name Pelones was never used by the Spanish for any Texas Apache group, the Pelones had fled for the Comanche south and southwest, but never mixed up with the Plains Lipan division – retaining their distinct identity, so that Morris Opler was told by his Lipan informants in 1935 that their tribal name was "People of the Forest")

=== Mescalero ===
Mescaleros primarily live in Eastern New Mexico.

- Faraones (also Fahanos, Apaches Faraone, Paraonez, Pharaones, Taraones, or Taracones) is derived from Spanish Faraón meaning "Pharaoh." Before 1700, the name was vague. Between 1720 and 1726, it referred to Apache between the Rio Grande, the Pecos River, the area around Santa Fe, and the Conchos River. After 1726, Faraones only referred to the groups of the north and central parts of this region. The Faraones like were part of the modern-day Mescalero or merged with them. After 1814, the term Faraones disappeared and was replaced by Mescalero.
- Sierra Blanca Mescaleros were a northern Mescalero group from the Sierra Blanca Mountains, who roamed in what is now eastern New Mexico and western Texas.
- Sacramento Mescaleros were a northern Mescalero group from the Sacramento and Organ Mountains, who roamed in what is now eastern New Mexico and western Texas.
- Guadalupe Mescaleros. were a northern Mescalero group from the Guadalupe Mountains, who roamed in what is now eastern New Mexico and western Texas.
- Limpia Mescaleros were a southern Mescalero group from the Limpia Mountains (later named as Davis Mountains) and roamed in what is now eastern New Mexico and western Texas.
- Natagés (also Natagees, Apaches del Natafé, Natagêes, Yabipais Natagé, Natageses, Natajes) is a term used from 1726 to 1820 to refer to the Faraón, Sierra Blanca, and Siete Ríos Apaches of southeastern New Mexico. In 1745, the Natagé are reported to have consisted of the Mescalero (around El Paso and the Organ Mountains) and the Salinero (around Rio Salado), but these were probably the same group, were oft called by the Spanish and Apaches themselves true Apaches, had had a considerable influence on the decision making of some bands of the Western Lipan in the 18th century. After 1749, the term became synonymous with Mescalero, which eventually replaced it.

==== Ethnobotany ====
The Mescalero tribe is known to use hundreds of different plants for various uses.

=== Plains Apache ===
Plains Apache (Kiowa-Apache, Naisha, Naʼishandine) are headquartered in Southwest Oklahoma. Historically, they followed the Kiowa. Other names for them include Ná'įįsha, Ná'ęsha, Na'isha, Na'ishandine, Na-i-shan-dina, Na-ishi, Na-e-ca, Ną'ishą́, Nadeicha, Nardichia, Nadíisha-déna, Na'dí'į́shą́ʼ, Nądí'įįshąą, and Naisha.

- Querechos referred to by Coronado in 1541, possibly Plains Apaches, at times maybe Navajo. Other early Spanish might have also called them Vaquereo or Llanero.

=== Western Apache ===
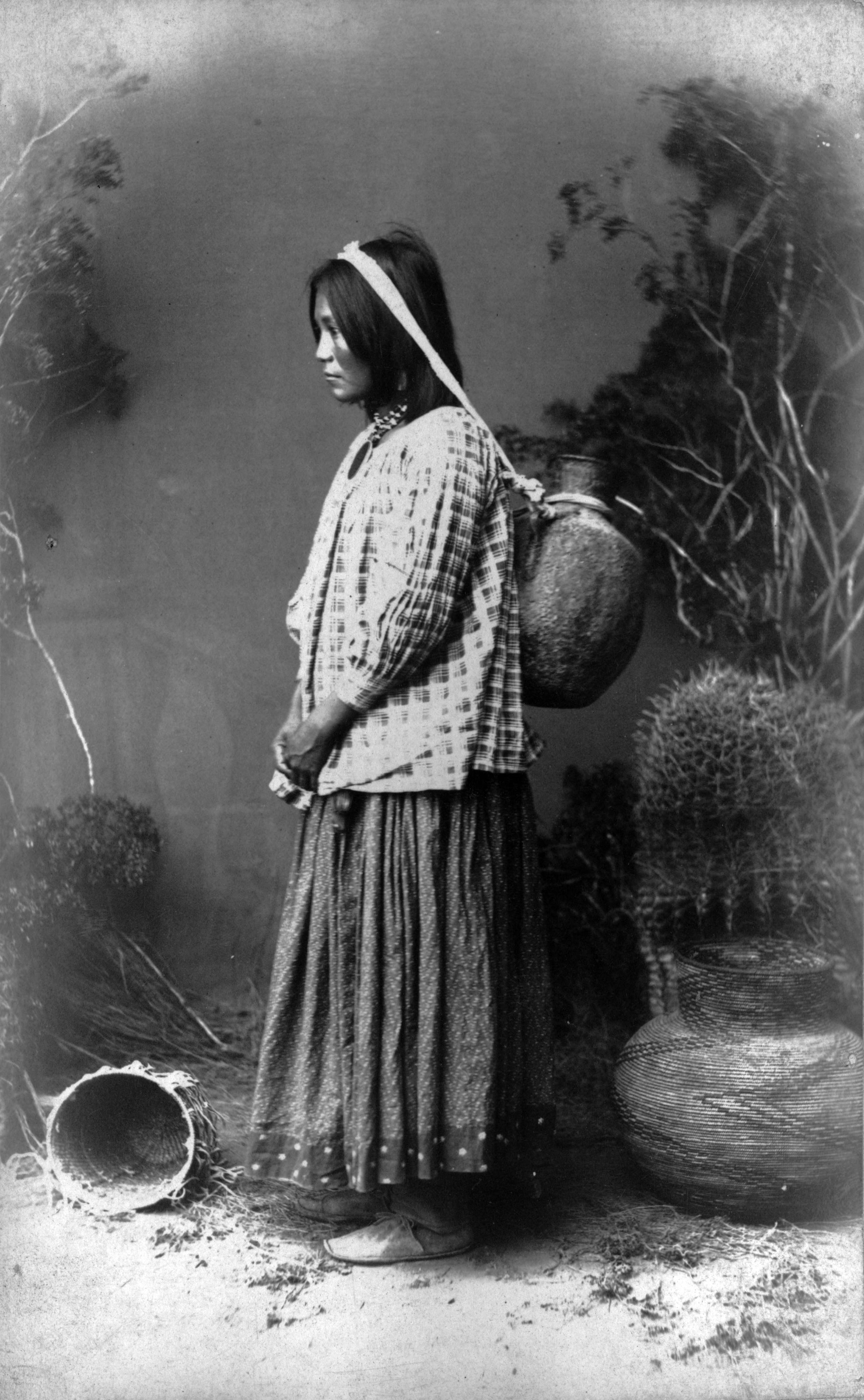
A Western Apache woman from the San Carlos group

Western Apache include Northern Tonto, Southern Tonto, Cibecue, White Mountain, and San Carlos groups. While these subgroups spoke the same language and had kinship ties, Western Apaches considered themselves as separate from each other, according to Goodwin. Other writers have used this term to refer to all non-Navajo Apachean peoples living west of the Rio Grande (thus failing to distinguish the Chiricahua from the other Apacheans). Goodwin's formulation: "all those Apache peoples who have lived within the present boundaries of the state of Arizona during historic times with the exception of the Chiricahua, Warm Springs, and allied Apache, and a small band of Apaches known as the Apache Mansos, who lived in the vicinity of Tucson."

- Cibecue is a Western Apache group, according to Goodwin, from north of the Salt River between the Tonto and White Mountain Apache, consisting of Ceder Creek, Carrizo, and Cibecue (proper) bands.
- San Carlos. A Western Apache group that ranged closest to Tucson according to Goodwin. This group consisted of the Apache Peaks, Arivaipa, Pinal, San Carlos (proper) bands.
  - Arivaipa (also Aravaipa) is a band of the San Carlos Apache. Schroeder believes the Arivaipa were a separate people in pre-reservation times. Arivaipa is a Hispanized word from the O'odham language. The Arivaipa are known as Tsézhiné ("Black Rock") in the Western Apache language.
  - Pinal (also Pinaleño). One of the bands of the San Carlos group of Western Apache, described by Goodwin. Also used along with Coyotero to refer more generally to one of two major Western Apache divisions. Some Pinaleño were referred to as the Gila Apache.
- Tonto. Goodwin divided into Northern Tonto and Southern Tonto groups, living in the north and west areas of the Western Apache groups according to Goodwin. This is north of Phoenix, north of the Verde River. Schroeder has suggested that the Tonto are originally Yavapais who assimilated Western Apache culture. Tonto is one of the major dialects of the Western Apache language. Tonto Apache speakers are traditionally bilingual in Western Apache and Yavapai. Goodwin's Northern Tonto consisted of Bald Mountain, Fossil Creek, Mormon Lake, and Oak Creek bands; Southern Tonto consisted of the Mazatzal band and unidentified "semi-bands".
- White Mountain are the easternmost group of the Western Apache, according to Goodwin, who included the Eastern White Mountain and Western White Mountain Apache.
  - Coyotero refers to a southern pre-reservation White Mountain group of the Western Apache, but has also been used more widely to refer to the Apache in general, Western Apache, or an Apache band in the high plains of Southern Colorado to Kansas.

==== Ethnobotany ====
- 134 ethnobotany plant uses have been identified in the Western Apache
- 165 ethnobotany plant uses have been identified in the White Mountain Apache
- 14 ethnobotany plant uses have been identified in the San Carlos Apache

=== Other terms ===
- Llanero is a Spanish-language borrowing meaning "plains dweller". The name referred to several different groups who hunted buffalo on the Great Plains. (See also Carlanas.)
- Lipiyánes (also Lipiyán, Lipillanes). A coalition of splinter groups of Nadahéndé (Natagés), Guhlkahéndé, and Lipan of the 18th century under the leadership of Picax-Ande-Ins-Tinsle ("Strong Arm"), who fought the Comanche on the Plains. This term is not to be confused with Lipan.

== History ==
=== Entry into the Southwest ===
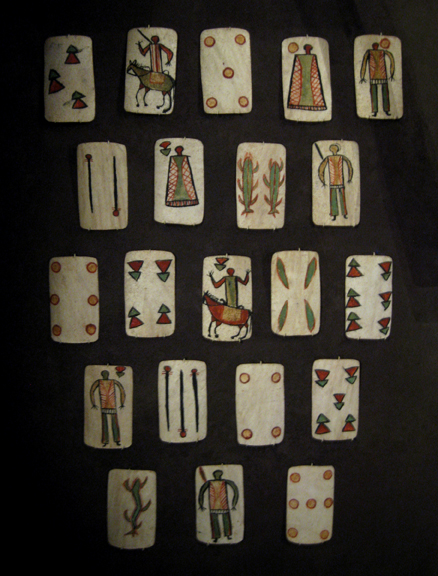
Apache rawhide playing cards c. 1875–1885, collection of NMAI.

The Apache and Navajo speak related languages of the Athabaskan language family. Other Athabaskan-speaking people in North America continue to reside in Alaska, western Canada, and the Northwest Pacific Coast. Anthropological evidence suggests that the Apache and Navajo peoples lived in these same northern locales before migrating to the Southwest sometime between AD 1200 and 1500.

The Apaches' nomadic way of life complicates accurate dating, primarily because they constructed less substantial dwellings than other Southwestern groups. Since the early 21st century, substantial progress has been made in dating and distinguishing their dwellings and other forms of material culture. They left behind a more austere set of tools and material goods than other Southwestern cultures.

The Athabaskan-speaking group probably moved into areas that were concurrently occupied or recently abandoned by other cultures. Other Athabaskan speakers, perhaps including the Southern Athabaskan, adapted many of their neighbors' technology and practices into their own cultures. Thus sites where early Southern Athabaskans may have lived are difficult to locate and even more difficult to firmly identify as culturally Southern Athabaskan. Recent advances have been made in the regard in the far southern portion of the American Southwest.

There are several hypotheses about Apache migrations. One posits that they moved into the Southwest from the Great Plains. In the mid-16th century, these mobile groups lived in tents, hunted bison and other game, and used dogs to pull travois loaded with their possessions. Substantial numbers of the people and a wide range were recorded by the Spanish in the 16th century.

In April 1541, while traveling on the plains east of the Pueblo region, Francisco Coronado referred to the people as "dog nomads." He wrote:

After seventeen days of travel, I came upon a 'rancheria' of the Indians who follow these cattle (bison). These natives are called Querechos. They do not cultivate the land, but eat raw meat and drink the blood of the cattle they kill. They dress in the skins of the cattle, with which all the people in this land clothe themselves, and they have very well-constructed tents, made with tanned and greased cowhides, in which they live and which they take along as they follow the cattle. They have dogs which they load to carry their tents, poles, and belongings.

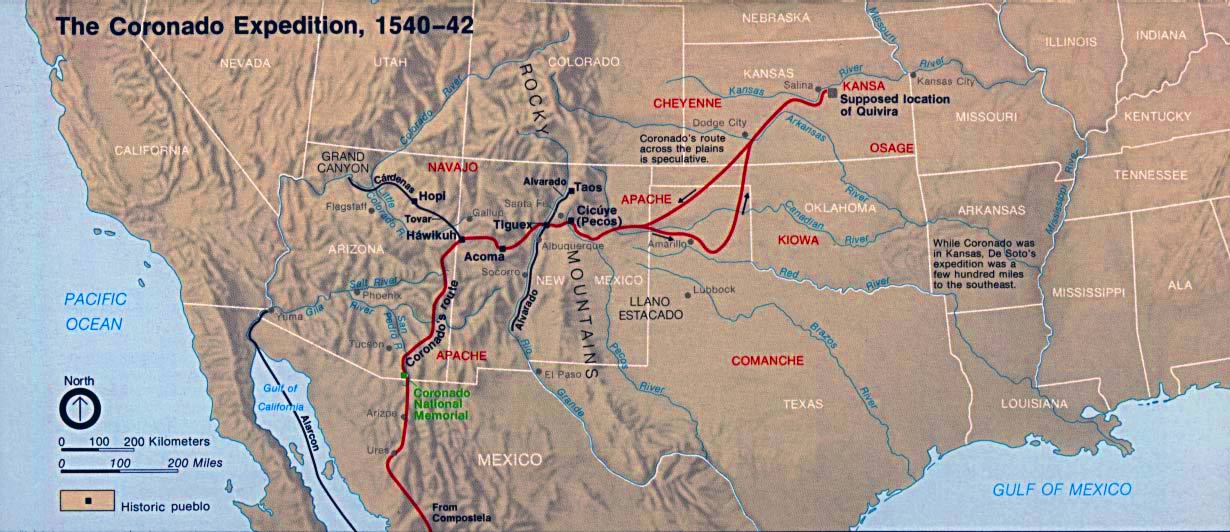
The Coronado Expedition, 1540–1542

The Spanish described Plains dogs as very white, with black spots, and "not much larger than water spaniels." Plains dogs were slightly smaller than those used for hauling loads by modern Inuit and northern First Nations people in Canada. Recent experiments show these dogs may have pulled loads up to 50 pounds (20 kg) on long trips, at rates as high as two or three miles per hour (3 to 5 km/h). The Plains migration theory associates the Apache peoples with the Dismal River culture, an archaeological culture known primarily from ceramics and house remains, dated 1675–1725, which has been excavated in Nebraska, eastern Colorado, and western Kansas.

Although the first documentary sources mention the Apache, and historians have suggested some passages indicate a 16th-century entry from the north, archaeological data indicate they were present on the plains long before this first reported contact.

A competing theory posits their migration south, through the Rocky Mountains, ultimately reaching the American Southwest by the 14th century or perhaps earlier. An archaeological material culture assemblage identified in this mountainous zone as ancestral Apache has been referred to as the "Cerro Rojo complex". This theory does not preclude arrival via a plains route as well, perhaps concurrently, but to date the earliest evidence has been found in the mountainous Southwest. The Plains Apache have a significant Southern Plains cultural influence.

When the Spanish arrived in the area, trade between the long-established Pueblo peoples and the Southern Athabaskan was well established. They reported the Pueblo exchanged maize and woven cotton goods for bison meat, and hides and materials for stone tools. Coronado observed the Plains people wintering near the Pueblo in established camps. Later Spanish sovereignty over the area disrupted trade between the Pueblo and the diverging Apache and Navajo groups. The Apache quickly acquired horses, improving their mobility for quick raids on settlements. In addition, the Pueblo were forced to work Spanish mission lands and care for mission flocks; they had fewer surplus goods to trade with their neighbors.

In 1540, Coronado reported that the modern Western Apache area was uninhabited, although some scholars have argued that he simply did not see the American Indians. Other Spanish explorers first mention "Querechos" living west of the Rio Grande in the 1580s. To some historians, this implies the Apaches moved into their current Southwestern homelands in the late 16th and early 17th centuries. Other historians note that Coronado reported that Pueblo women and children had often been evacuated by the time his party attacked their dwellings, and that he saw some dwellings had been recently abandoned as he moved up the Rio Grande. This might indicate the semi-nomadic Southern Athabaskan had advance warning about his hostile approach and evaded encounter with the Spanish. Archaeologists are finding ample evidence of an early proto-Apache presence in the Southwestern mountain zone in the 15th century and perhaps earlier. The Apache presence on both the Plains and in the mountainous Southwest indicate that the people took multiple early migration routes.

=== Conflict with Mexico and the United States ===
In general, the recently arrived Spanish colonists, who settled in villages, and Apache bands developed a pattern of interaction over a few centuries. Both raided and traded with each other. Records of the period seem to indicate that relationships depended on the specific villages and bands: a band might be friends with one village and raid another. When war occurred, the Spanish would send troops; after a battle both sides would "sign a treaty" and go home.

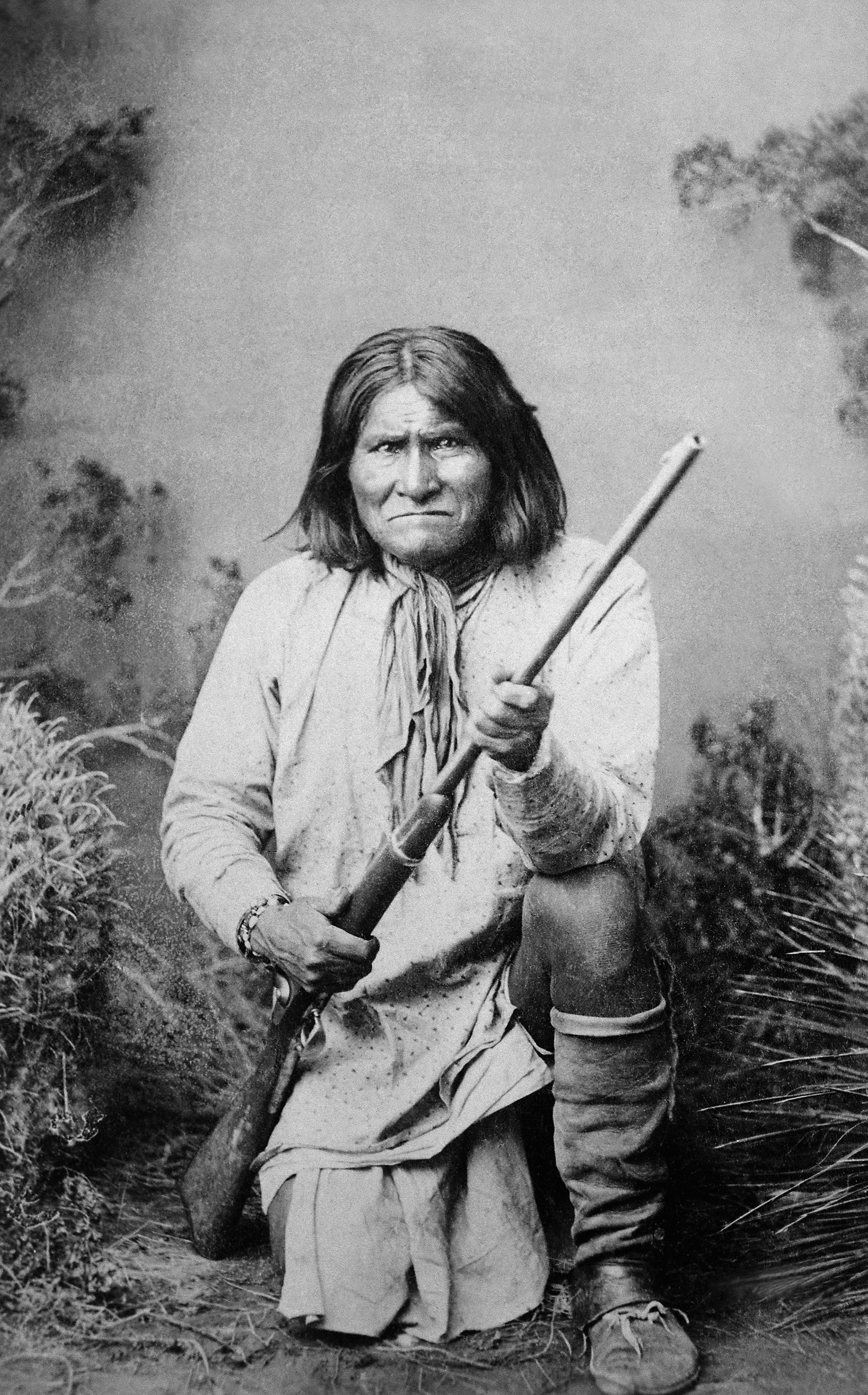
Geronimo

The traditional and sometimes treacherous relationships continued after the independence of Mexico in 1821. By 1835 Mexico had placed a bounty on Apache scalps (see scalping), but certain villages still traded with some bands. When Juan José Compà, the leader of the Copper Mines Mimbreño Apaches, was killed for bounty money in 1837, Mangas Coloradas (Red Sleeves) or Dasoda-hae (He just sits there) became the principal chief and war leader; also in 1837 Soldado Fiero (a.k.a. Fuerte), leader of the Warm Springs Mimbreño Apaches, was killed by Mexican soldiers near Janos, and his son Cuchillo Negro (Black Knife) became the principal chief and war leader. They (being now Mangas Coloradas the first chief and Cuchillo Negro the second chief of the whole Tchihende or Mimbreño people) conducted a series of retaliatory raids against the Mexicans. By 1856, authorities in horse-rich Durango would claim that Indian raids (mostly Comanche and Apache) in their state had taken nearly 6,000 lives, abducted 748 people, and forced the abandonment of 358 settlements over the previous 20 years.

When the United States went to war against Mexico in 1846, many Apache bands promised U.S. soldiers safe passage through their lands. When the U.S. claimed former territories of Mexico in 1846, Mangas Coloradas signed a peace treaty with the nation, respecting them as conquerors of the Mexicans' land. An uneasy peace with U.S. citizens held until the 1850s. An influx of gold miners into the Santa Rita Mountains led to conflict with the Apache. This period is sometimes called the Apache Wars.

The United States' concept of a reservation had not been used by the Spanish, Mexicans or other Apache neighbors before. Reservations were often badly managed, and bands that had no kinship relationships were forced to live together. No fences existed to keep people in or out. It was common for a band to be allowed to leave for a short period of time. Other times a band would leave without permission, to raid, return to their homeland to forage, or to simply get away. The U.S. military usually had forts nearby to keep the bands on the reservations by finding and returning those who left. The reservation policies of the U.S. caused conflict and war with the various Apache bands who left the reservations for almost another quarter century.

War between the Apaches and Euro-Americans has led to a stereotypical focus on certain aspects of Apache cultures. These have often been distorted through misunderstanding of their cultures, as noted by anthropologist Keith Basso:

Of the hundreds of peoples that lived and flourished in native North America, few have been so consistently misrepresented as the Apacheans of Arizona and New Mexico. Glorified by novelists, sensationalized by historians, and distorted beyond credulity by commercial film makers, the popular image of 'the Apache'—a brutish, terrifying semi-human bent upon wanton death and destruction—is almost entirely a product of irresponsible caricature and exaggeration. Indeed, there can be little doubt that the Apache has been transformed from a native American into an American legend, the fanciful and fallacious creation of a non-Indian citizenry whose inability to recognize the massive treachery of ethnic and cultural stereotypes has been matched only by its willingness to sustain and inflate them.

=== Forced removal ===
In 1875, United States military forced the removal of an estimated 1,500 Yavapai and Dilzhe'e Apache (better known as Tonto Apache) from the Rio Verde Indian Reserve and its several thousand acres of treaty lands promised to them by the United States government. At the orders of Indian Commissioner L. E. Dudley, U.S. Army troops made the people, young and old, walk through winter-flooded rivers, mountain passes and narrow canyon trails to get to the Indian Agency at San Carlos, 180 miles (290 km) away. The trek killed several hundred people. The people were interned there for 25 years while white settlers took over their land. Only a few hundred ever returned to their lands. At the San Carlos reservation, the Buffalo soldiers of the 9th Cavalry Regiment—replacing the 8th Cavalry who were being stationed to Texas—guarded the Apaches from 1875 to 1881.

Beginning in 1879, an Apache uprising against the reservation system led to Victorio's War between Chief Victorio's band of Apaches and the 9th Cavalry.

=== Defeat ===
Most United States' histories of this era report that the final defeat of an Apache band took place when 5,000 US troops forced Geronimo's group of 30 to 50 men, women and children to surrender on September 4, 1886, at Skeleton Canyon, Arizona. The Army sent this band and the Chiricahua scouts who had tracked them to military confinement in Florida at Fort Pickens and, subsequently, Ft. Sill, Oklahoma.

Many books were written on the stories of hunting and trapping during the late 19th century. Many of these stories involve Apache raids and the failure of agreements with Americans and Mexicans. In the post-war era, the US government arranged for Apache children to be taken from their families for adoption by white Americans in assimilation programs.

== Pre-reservation culture ==
=== Social organization ===
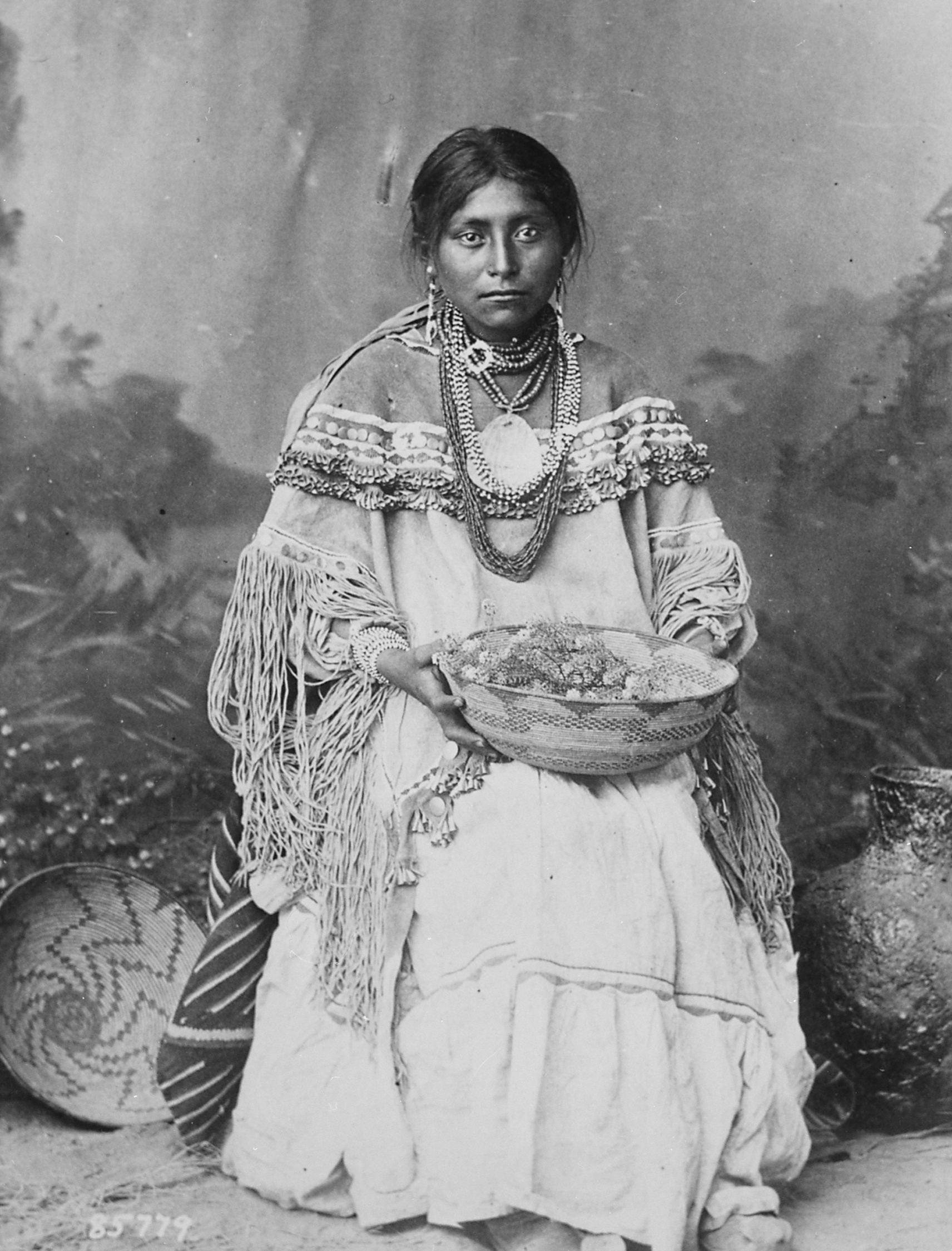
Apache bride

All Apache peoples lived in extended family units (or family clusters); they usually lived close together, with each nuclear family in separate dwellings. An extended family generally consisted of a husband and wife, their unmarried children, their married daughters, their married daughters' husbands, and their married daughters' children. Thus, the extended family is connected through a lineage of women who live together (that is, matrilocal residence), into which men may enter upon marriage (leaving behind his parents' family).

When a daughter married, a new dwelling was built nearby for her and her husband. Among the Navajo, residence rights are ultimately derived from a head mother. Although the Western Apache usually practiced matrilocal residence, sometimes the eldest son chose to bring his wife to live with his parents after marriage. All tribes practiced sororate and levirate marriages.

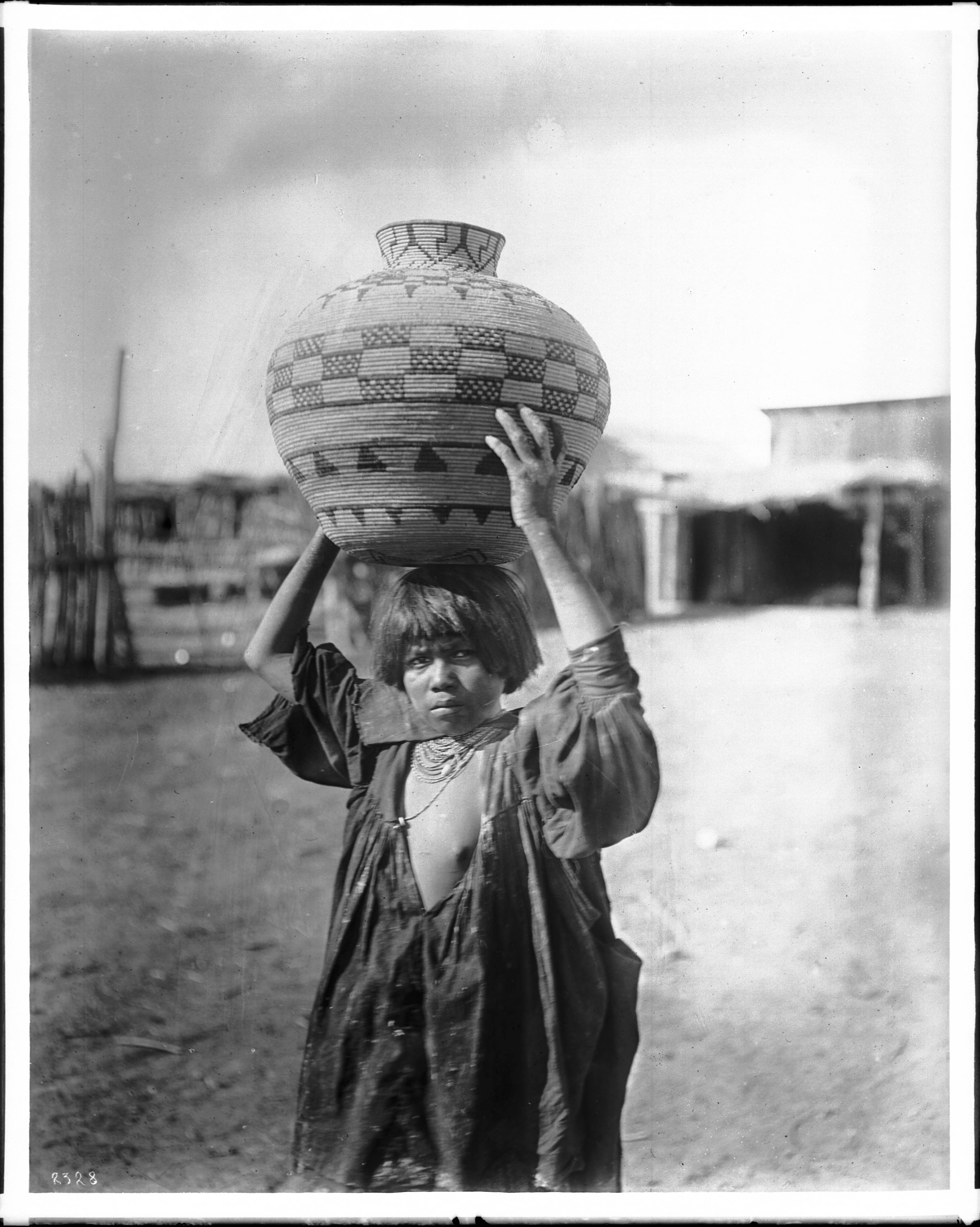
Apache Indian girl carrying an olla (a water basket) on her head, c. 1900

Apache men practiced varying degrees of "avoidance" of his wife's close relatives, a practice often most strictly observed by distance between mother-in-law and son-in-law. The degree of avoidance differed by Apache group. The most elaborate system was among the Chiricahua, where men had to use indirect polite speech toward and were not allowed to be within visual sight of the wife's female relatives, whom he had to avoid. His female Chiricahua relatives through marriage also avoided him.

Several extended families worked together as a "local group", which carried out certain ceremonies, and economic and military activities. Political control was mostly present at the local group level. Local groups were headed by a chief, an influential man with an impressive reputation. The position was not hereditary, and was often filled by members of different extended families. The chief's influence was as strong as he was evaluated to be—no group member was obliged to follow the chief. Western Apache criteria for a good chief included: industriousness, generosity, impartiality, forbearance, conscientiousness, and eloquence in language.

Many Apache peoples joined several local groups into "bands". Banding was strongest among the Chiricahua and Western Apache, and weak among the Lipan and Mescalero. The Navajo did not organize into bands, perhaps because of the requirements of the sheepherding economy. However, the Navajo did have "the outfit", a group of relatives that was larger than the extended family, but smaller than a local group community or a band.

On a larger level, Western Apache bands organized into what Grenville Goodwin called "groups". He reported five groups for the Western Apache: Northern Tonto, Southern Tonto, Cibecue, San Carlos, and White Mountain. The Jicarilla grouped their bands into "moieties", perhaps influenced by the northeastern Pueblo. The Western Apache and Navajo also had a system of matrilineal "clans" organized further into phratries (perhaps influenced by the western Pueblo).

The notion of a tribe within Apache cultures is very weakly developed; essentially it was only a recognition "that one owed a modicum of hospitality to those of the same speech, dress, and customs." The six Apache tribes had political independence from each other and even fought against each other. For example, the Lipan once fought against the Mescalero.

==== Kinship systems ====
The Apache tribes have two distinctly different kinship term systems: a Chiricahua type and a Jicarilla type. The Chiricahua-type system is used by the Chiricahua, Mescalero, and Western Apache. The Western Apache kinship system differs slightly from the other two but shares similarities with the Navajo system.

The Jicarilla type, which is similar to the Dakota–Iroquois kinship systems, is used by the Jicarilla, Navajo, Lipan, and Plains Apache. The Navajo system is more divergent among the four, having similarities with the Chiricahua-type system. The Lipan and Plains Apache systems are very similar.

===== Chiricahua =====
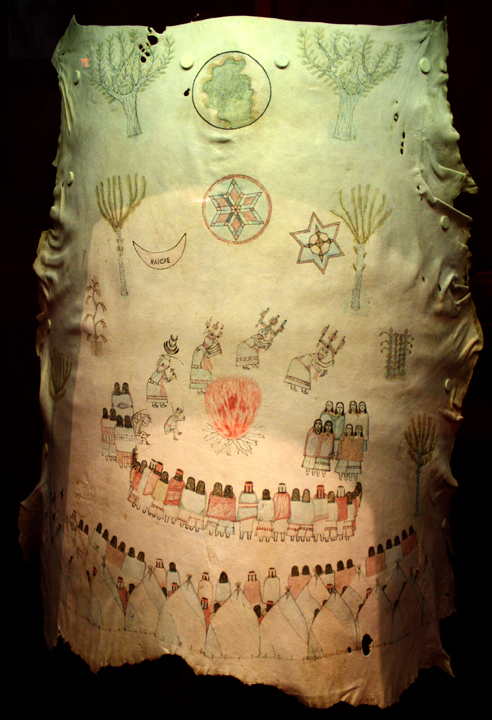
Hide painting depicting Apache girl's puberty ceremony, by Naiche (Chiricahua Apache), c. 1900, Oklahoma History Center

The Chiricahua language has four words for grandparent: -chú (Note: All kinship terms in Apache languages are inherently possessed, which means they must be preceded by a possessive prefix. This is signified by the preceding hyphen.) "maternal grandmother", -tsúyé "maternal grandfather", -chʼiné "paternal grandmother", -nálé "paternal grandfather". Additionally, a grandparent's siblings are identified by the same word; thus, one's maternal grandmother, one's maternal grandmother's sisters, and one's maternal grandmother's brothers are all called -chú. Furthermore, the grandchild terms are reciprocal, that is, one uses the same term to refer to their grandchild. For example, a person's maternal grandmother is called -chú and that grandmother also calls that granddaughter -chú (i.e. -chú can mean the child of either your own daughter or your sibling's daughter.)

Chiricahua cousins are not distinguished from siblings through kinship terms. Thus, the same word refers to either a sibling or a cousin (there are not separate terms for parallel-cousin and cross-cousin). The terms depend on the sex of the speaker (unlike the English terms brother and sister): -kʼis "same-sex sibling or same-sex cousin", -´-ląh "opposite-sex sibling or opposite-sex cousin". This means if one is a male, then one's brother is called -kʼis and one's sister is called -´-ląh. If one is a female, then one's brother is called -´-ląh and one's sister is called -kʼis. Chiricahuas in a -´-ląh relationship observed great restraint and respect toward that relative; cousins (but not siblings) in a -´-ląh relationship may practice total avoidance.

Two different words are used for each parent according to sex: -mááʼ "mother", -taa "father". Likewise, there are two words for a parent's child according to sex: -yáchʼeʼ "daughter", -gheʼ "son".

A parent's siblings are classified together regardless of sex: -ghúyé "maternal aunt or uncle (mother's brother or sister)", -deedééʼ "paternal aunt or uncle (father's brother or sister)". These two terms are reciprocal like the grandparent/grandchild terms. Thus, -ghúyé also refers to one's opposite-sex sibling's son or daughter (that is, a person will call their maternal aunt -ghúyé and that aunt will call them -ghúyé in return).

===== Jicarilla =====
Unlike the Chiricahua system, the Jicarilla have only two terms for grandparents according to sex: -chóó "grandmother", -tsóyéé "grandfather". They do not have separate terms for maternal or paternal grandparents. The terms are also used of a grandparent's siblings according to sex. Thus, -chóó refers to one's grandmother or one's grand-aunt (either maternal or paternal); -tsóyéé refers to one's grandfather or one's grand-uncle. These terms are not reciprocal. There is a single word for grandchild (regardless of sex): -tsóyí̱í̱.

There are two terms for each parent. These terms also refer to that parent's same-sex sibling: -ʼnííh "mother or maternal aunt (mother's sister)", -kaʼéé "father or paternal uncle (father's brother)". Additionally, there are two terms for a parent's opposite-sex sibling depending on sex: -daʼá̱á̱ "maternal uncle (mother's brother)", -béjéé "paternal aunt (father's sister).

Two terms are used for same-sex and opposite-sex siblings. These terms are also used for parallel-cousins: -kʼisé "same-sex sibling or same-sex parallel cousin (i.e. same-sex father's brother's child or mother's sister's child)", -´-láh "opposite-sex sibling or opposite parallel cousin (i.e. opposite-sex father's brother's child or mother's sister's child)". These two terms can also be used for cross-cousins. There are also three sibling terms based on the age relative to the speaker: -ndádéé "older sister", -´-naʼá̱á̱ "older brother", -shdá̱zha "younger sibling (i.e. younger sister or brother)". Additionally, there are separate words for cross-cousins: -zeedń "cross-cousin (either same-sex or opposite-sex of speaker)", -iłnaaʼaash "male cross-cousin" (only used by male speakers).

A parent's child is classified with their same-sex sibling's or same-sex cousin's child: -zhácheʼe "daughter, same-sex sibling's daughter, same-sex cousin's daughter", -gheʼ "son, same-sex sibling's son, same-sex cousin's son". There are different words for an opposite-sex sibling's child: -daʼá̱á̱ "opposite-sex sibling's daughter", -daʼ "opposite-sex sibling's son".

=== Housing ===
Apache lived in three types of houses. Tipis were common in the plains. Wickiups were common in the highlands; these were 8-foot-tall (2.4 m) framed of wood held together with yucca fibers and covered in brush. If a family member died, the wickiup would be burned. Apache of the desert of northern Mexico lived in hogans, an earthen structure for keeping cool.

Below is a description of Chiricahua wickiups recorded by anthropologist Morris Opler:

The home in which the family lives is made by the women and is ordinarily a circular, dome-shaped brush dwelling, with the floor at ground level. It is seven feet high at the center and approximately eight feet in diameter. To build it, long fresh poles of oak or willow are driven into the ground or placed in holes made with a digging stick. These poles, which form the framework, are arranged at one-foot intervals and are bound together at the top with yucca-leaf strands. Over them a thatching of bundles of big bluestem grass or bear grass is tied, shingle style, with yucca strings. A smoke hole opens above a central fireplace. A hide, suspended at the entrance, is fixed on a cross-beam so that it may be swung forward or backward. The doorway may face in any direction. For waterproofing, pieces of hide are thrown over the outer hatching, and in rainy weather, if a fire is not needed, even the smoke hole is covered. In warm, dry weather much of the outer roofing is stripped off. It takes approximately three days to erect a sturdy dwelling of this type. These houses are 'warm and comfortable, even though there is a big snow.' The interior is lined with brush and grass beds over which robes are spread ...

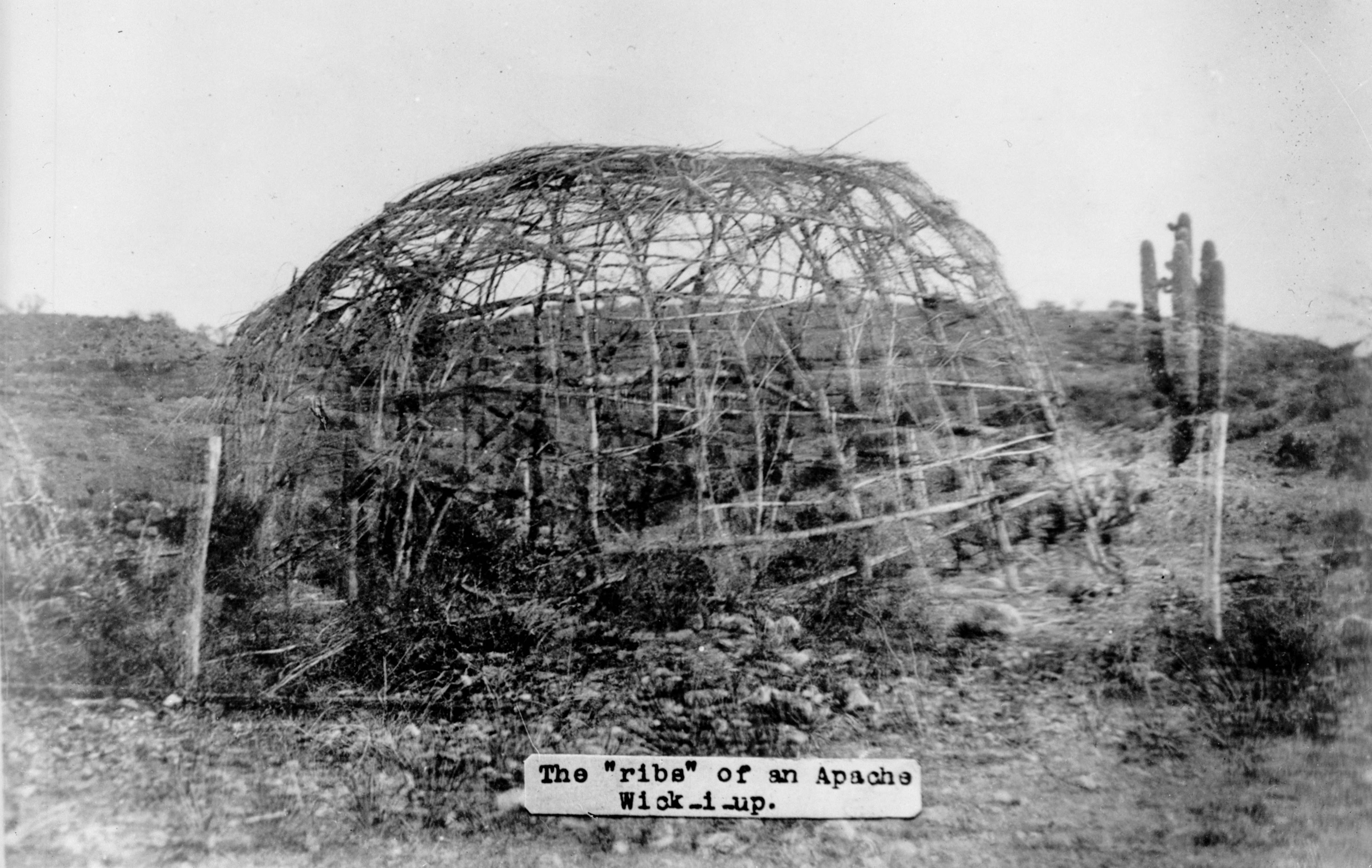
Frame of Apache wickiup

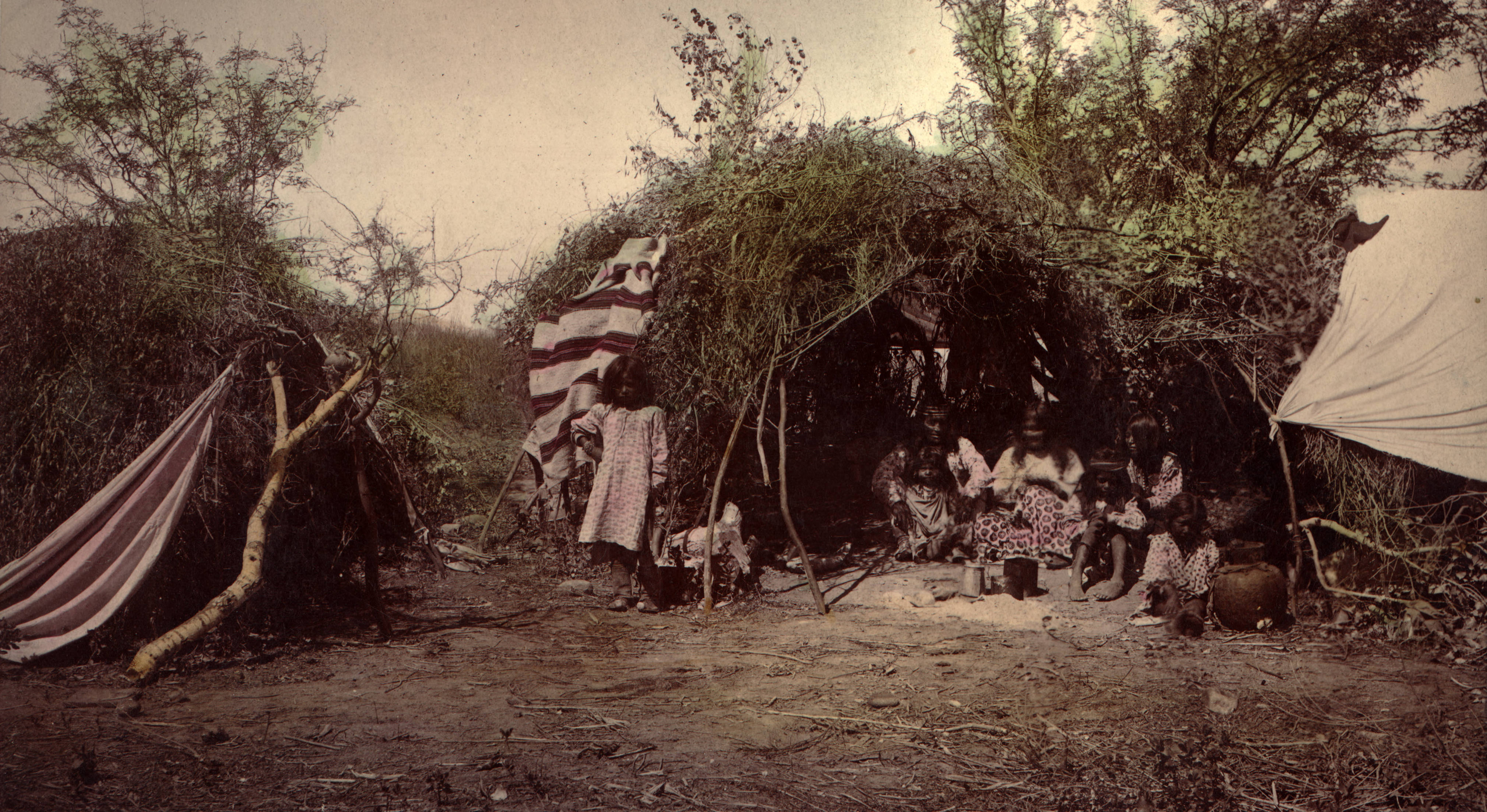
Chiricahua medicine man in wickiup with family

The woman not only makes the furnishings of the home but is responsible for the construction, maintenance, and repair of the dwelling itself and for the arrangement of everything in it. She provides the grass and brush beds and replaces them when they become too old and dry ... However, formerly 'they had no permanent homes, so they didn't bother with cleaning.' The dome-shaped dwelling or wickiup, the usual home type for all the Chiricahua bands, has already been described ... Said a Central Chiricahua informant.

Both the teepee and the oval-shaped house were used when I was a boy. The oval hut was covered with hide and was the best house. The more well-to-do had this kind. The tepee type was just made of brush. It had a place for a fire in the center. It was just thrown together. Both types were common even before my time ...

A house form that departs from the more common dome-shaped variety is recorded for the Southern Chiricahua as well:

... When we settled down, we used the wickiup; when we were moving around a great deal, we used this other kind ...

Recent research has documented the archaeological remains of Chiricahua Apache wickiups as found on protohistoric and at historical sites, such as Canon de los Embudos where C. S. Fly photographed Geronimo, his people, and dwellings during surrender negotiations in 1886, demonstrating their unobtrusive and improvised nature."

=== Food ===
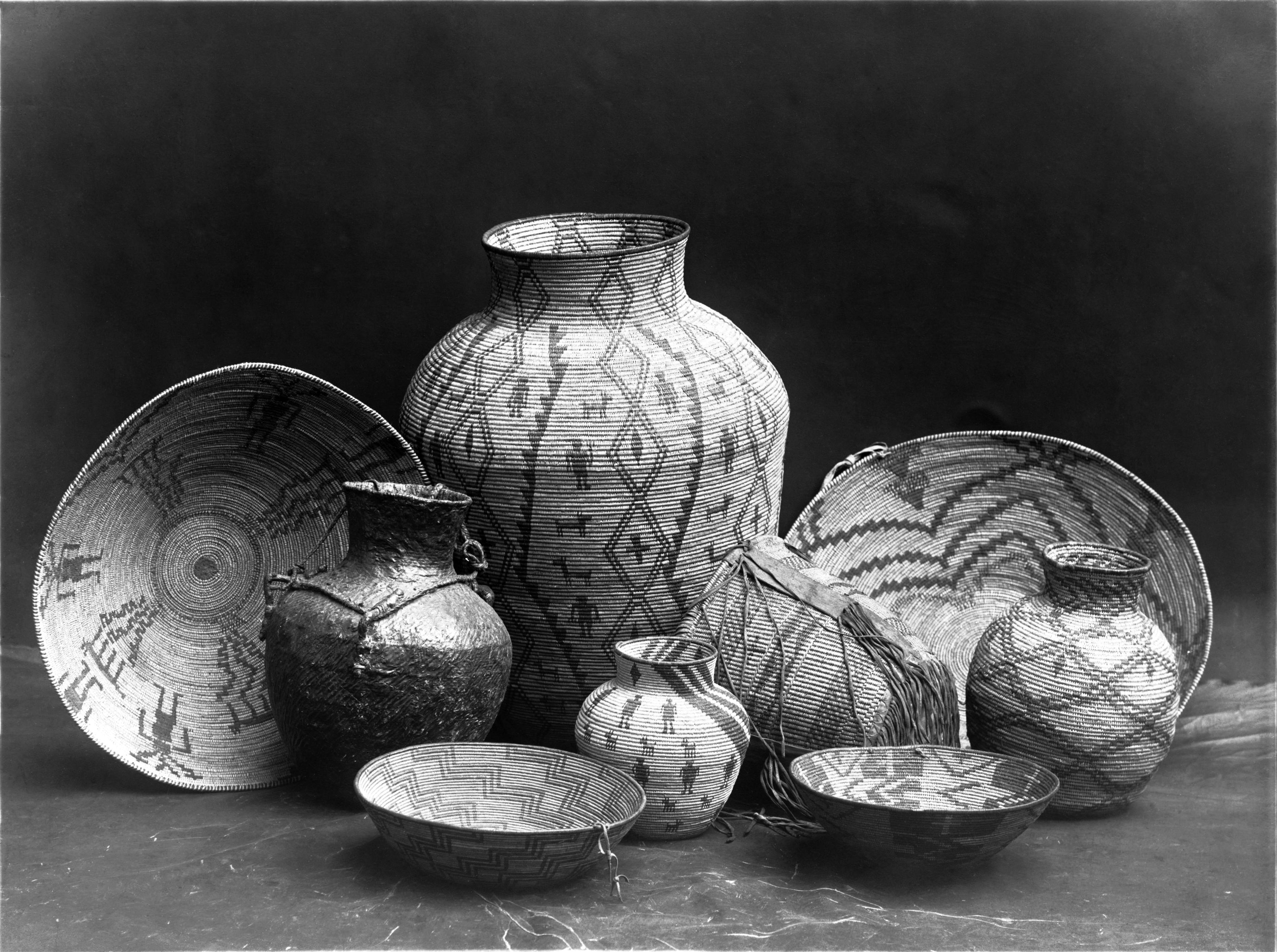
Various Apache containers: baskets, bowls and jars. Apache women wove yucca, willow leaves, or juniper bark into baskets that could hold heavy loads.

Apache people obtained food from hunting, gathering wild plants, cultivating domestic plants, trade, or raiding neighboring groups for livestock and agricultural projects.

Particular types of foods eaten by a group depending upon their respective environment.

==== Hunting ====
Hunting was done primarily by men, although there were sometimes exceptions depending on animal and culture (e.g. Lipan women could help in hunting rabbits and Chiricahua boys were also allowed to hunt rabbits).

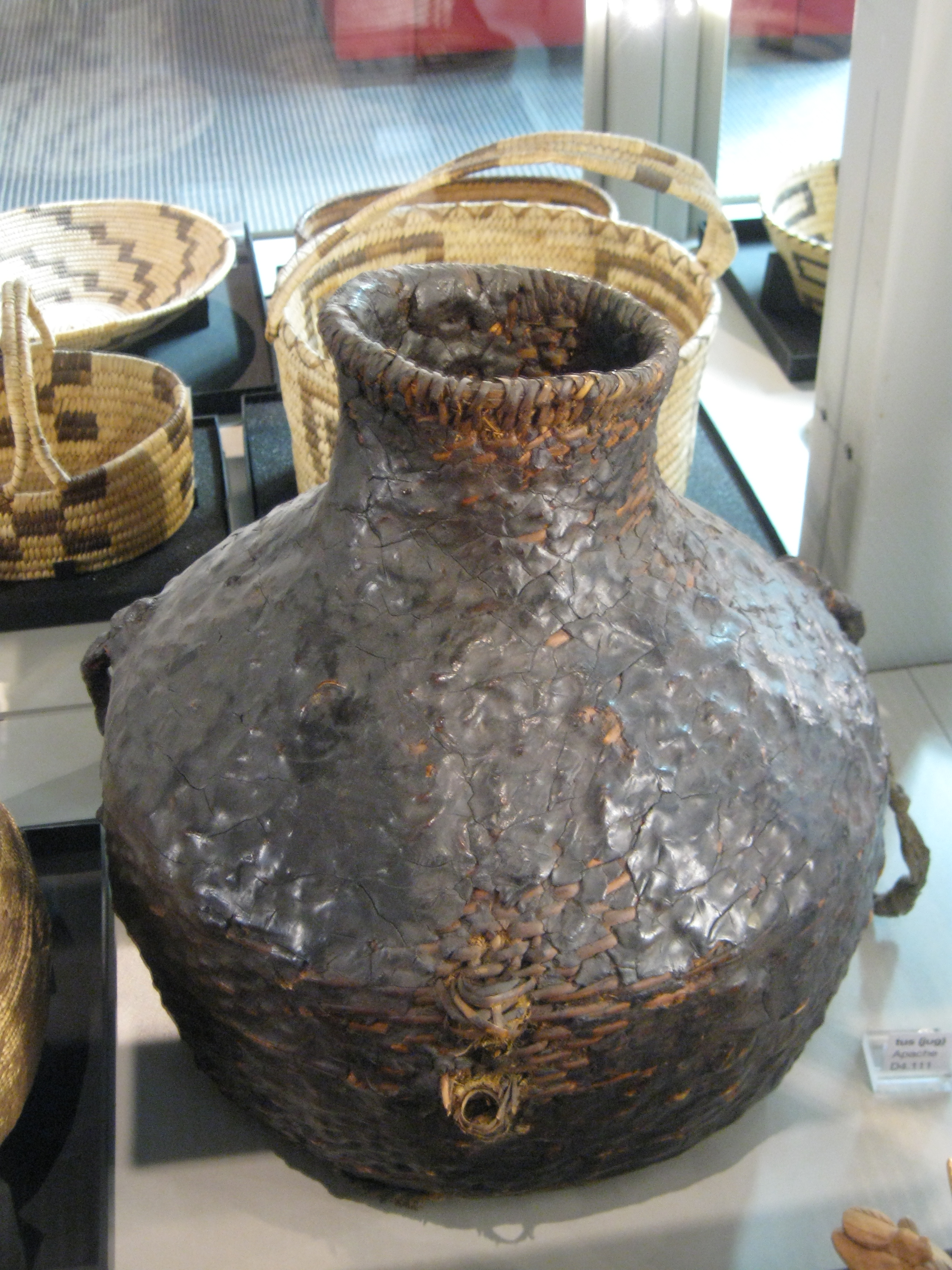
Apache jug

Hunting often had elaborate preparations, such as fasting and religious rituals performed by medicine men before and after the hunt. In Lipan culture, since deer were protected by Mountain Spirits, great care was taken in Mountain Spirit rituals to ensure smooth hunting. Slaughter follows religious guidelines (many of which are recorded in religious stories) prescribing cutting, prayers, and bone disposal. Southern Athabascan hunters often distributed successfully slaughtered game. For example, among the Mescalero a hunter was expected to share as much as half of his kill with a fellow hunter and needy people at the camp. Feelings of individuals about this practice spoke of social obligation and spontaneous generosity.

The most common hunting weapon before the introduction of European guns was the bow and arrow. Various hunting techniques were used. Some involved wearing animal head masks as a disguise. Whistles were sometimes used to lure animals closer. Another technique was the relay method where hunters positioned at various points would chase the prey in turns in order to tire the animal. A similar method involved chasing the prey down a steep cliff.

Eating certain animals was taboo. Although different cultures had different taboos, common examples included bears, peccaries, turkeys, fish, snakes, insects, owls, and coyotes. An example of taboo differences: the black bear was a part of the Lipan diet (although less common as buffalo, deer, or antelope), but the Jicarilla never ate bear because it was considered an evil animal. Some taboos were a regional phenomenon, such as fish, which was taboo throughout the southwest (e.g. in certain Pueblo cultures like the Hopi and Zuni) and considered to resemble a snake (an evil animal) in physical appearance.

Western Apache hunted deer and pronghorns mostly in the ideal late fall. After the meat was smoked into jerky around November, they migrated from the farm sites in the mountains along stream banks to winter camps in the Salt, Black, Gila River and even the Colorado River valleys.

The Chiricahua mostly hunted deer followed by pronghorn. Lesser game included cottontail rabbits, opossums, squirrels, surplus horses, surplus mules, wapiti (elk), wild cattle and wood rats.

The Mescalero primarily hunted deer. Other game includes bighorn sheep, buffalo (for those living closer to the plains), cottontail rabbits, elk, horses, mules, opossums, pronghorn, wild steers, and wood rats. Beavers, minks, muskrats, and weasels were hunted for their hides but were not eaten.

The Jicarilla primarily hunted bighorn sheep, buffalo, deer, elk, and pronghorn. Other game included beaver, bighorn sheep, chief hares, chipmunks, doves, groundhogs, grouse, peccaries, porcupines, prairie dogs, quail, rabbits, skunks, snow birds, squirrels, turkeys and wood rats. Burros and horses were only eaten in emergencies. Minks, weasels, wildcats and wolves were not eaten but hunted for their body parts.

The Lipan ate mostly buffalo with a three-week hunt during the fall and smaller hunts until the spring. The second most utilized animal was deer. Fresh deer blood was drunk for health. Other animals included beavers, bighorns, black bears, burros, ducks, elk, fish, horses, mountain lions, mourning doves, mules, prairie dogs, pronghorns, quail, rabbits, squirrels, turkeys, turtles, and wood rats. Skunks were eaten only in emergencies.

Plains Apache hunters hunted primarily buffalo and deer. Other game included badgers, bears, beavers, fowl (including geese), opossums, otters, rabbits, and tortoises.

=== Clothing ===
Influenced by the Plains Indians, Western Apaches wore clothing sewn from animal hides decorated with seed beads for clothing. These beaded designs historically resembled that of the Great Basin Paiute and is characterized by linear patterning. Apache beaded clothing was bordered with narrow bands of glass seed beads in diagonal stripes of alternating colors. They made buckskin shirts, ponchos, skirts, and moccasins and decorated them with colorful beadwork.

=== Undomesticated plants and other food sources ===
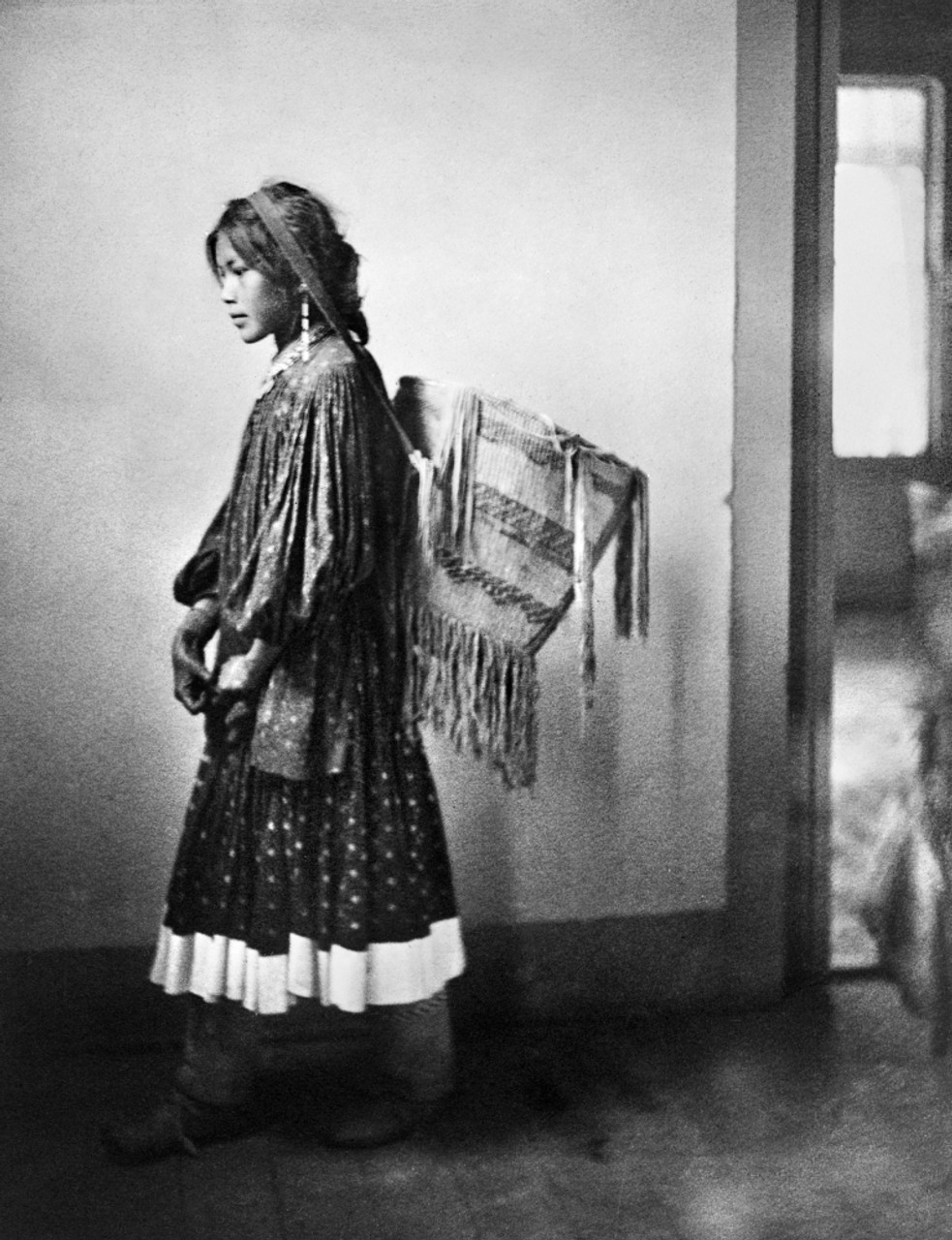
Apache girl with basket, 1902

The gathering of plants and other food was primarily done by women. The men's job was usually to hunt animals such as deer, buffalo, and small game. However, men helped in certain gathering activities, such as of heavy agave crowns. Numerous plants were used as both food and medicine and in religious ceremonies. Other plants were used for only their religious or medicinal value.

In May, the Western Apache baked and dried agave crowns pounded into pulp and formed into rectangular cakes. At the end of June and beginning of July, saguaro, prickly pear, and cholla fruits were gathered. In July and August, mesquite beans, Spanish bayonet fruit, and Emory oak acorns were gathered. In late September, gathering was stopped as attention moved to harvesting cultivated crops. In late fall, juniper berries and pinyon nuts were gathered.

The most important plant food for the Chiricahua was the Century plant (also known as mescal or agave). The crowns (the tuberous base portion) were baked in large underground ovens and sun-dried. The shoots were also eaten. Other plants used by the Chiricahua include: agarita (or algerita) berries, alligator juniper berries, anglepod seeds, banana yucca (or datil, broadleaf yucca) fruit, chili peppers, chokecherries, cota (used for tea), currants, dropseed grass seeds, Gambel oak acorns, Gambel oak bark (used for tea), grass seeds (of various varieties), greens (of various varieties), hawthorne fruit, Lamb's-quarters leaves, lip ferns (used for tea), live oak acorns, locust blossoms, locust pods, maize kernels (used for tiswin), and mesquite beans.

Also eaten were mulberries, narrowleaf yucca blossoms, narrowleaf yucca stalks, nipple cactus fruit, one-seed juniper berries, onions, pigweed seeds, pinyon nuts, pitahaya fruit, prickly pear fruit, prickly pear juice, raspberries, screwbean (or tornillo) fruit, saguaro fruit, spurge seeds, strawberries, sumac (Rhus trilobata) berries, sunflower seeds, tule rootstocks, tule shoots, pigweed tumbleweed seeds, unicorn plant seeds, walnuts, western yellow pine inner bark (used as a sweetener), western yellow pine nuts, whitestar potatoes (Ipomoea lacunosa), wild grapes, wild potatoes (Solanum jamesii), wood sorrel leaves, and yucca buds (unknown species). Other items include: honey from ground hives and hives found within agave, sotol, and narrowleaf yucca plants.

The abundant agave (mescal) was also important to the Mescalero, (Note: The name Mescalero is, in fact, derived from the word mescal, a reference to their use of this plant as food.) who gathered the crowns in late spring after reddish flower stalks appeared. The smaller sotol crowns were also important. The crowns of both plants were baked and dried. Other plants include: acorns, agarita berries, amole stalks (roasted and peeled), aspen inner bark (used as a sweetener), bear grass stalks (roasted and peeled), box elder inner bark (used as a sweetener), banana yucca fruit, banana yucca flowers, box elder sap (used as a sweetener), cactus fruits (of various varieties), cattail rootstocks, chokecherries, currants, dropseed grass seeds (used for flatbread), elderberries, gooseberries (Ribes leptanthum and R. pinetorum), grapes, hackberries, hawthorne fruit, and hops (used as condiment).

They also used horsemint (as a condiment), juniper berries, Lamb's-quarters leaves, locust flowers, locust pods, mesquite pods, mint (as a condiment), mulberries, pennyroyal (as a condiment), pigweed seeds (for flatbread), pine inner bark (as a sweetener), pinyon pine nuts, prickly pear fruit (dethorned and roasted), purslane leaves, raspberries, sage (as a condiment), screwbeans, sedge tubers, shepherd's purse leaves, strawberries, sunflower seeds, tumbleweed seeds (for flatbread), vetch pods, walnuts, western white pine nuts, western yellow pine nuts, white evening primrose fruit, wild celery (as a condiment), wild onion (as a condiment), wild pea pods, wild potatoes, and wood sorrel leaves.

The Jicarilla used acorns, chokecherries, juniper berries, mesquite beans, pinyon nuts, prickly pear fruit, yucca fruit, and many other kinds of fruits, acorns, greens, nuts, and seed grasses.

The Lipan heavily used agave (mescal) and sotol. Other plants include agarita, blackberries, cattails, devil's claw, elderberries, gooseberries, hackberries, hawthorn, juniper, Lamb's-quarters, locust, mesquite, mulberries, oak, palmetto, pecan, pinyon, prickly pears, raspberries, screwbeans, seed grasses, strawberries, sumac, sunflowers, Texas persimmons, walnuts, western yellow pine, wild cherries, wild grapes, wild onions, wild plums, wild potatoes, wild roses, yucca flowers, and yucca fruit. Other gathered food includes salt obtained from caves and honey.

The Plains Apache gathered chokecherries, blackberries, grapes, prairie turnips, wild onions, and wild plums, and many other fruits, vegetables, and tuberous roots.

==== Ethnobotany ====
A list of 198 ethnobotany plant uses for the Chiricahua can be found at http://naeb.brit.org/uses/tribes/11/, which also includes the Mescalero.

A list of 54 ethnobotany plant uses for the uncategorized Apache can also be found here. http://naeb.brit.org/uses/tribes/10/.

=== Crop cultivation ===
The Navajo practiced the most crop cultivation, the Western Apache, Jicarilla, and Lipan less. The one Chiricahua band (of Opler's) and the Mescalero practiced very little cultivation. The other two Chiricahua bands and the Plains Apache did not grow any crops.

=== Trade, raids, and war ===
Interchanges between the Apache and European-descended explorers and settlers included trading. The Apache found they could use European and American goods.

Apaches distinguished raiding from war. Raiding was done in small parties with a specific economic purpose. War was waged in large parties (often clan members), usually to achieve retribution. Raiding was traditional for the Apache, but Mexican settlers objected to their stock being stolen. As tensions grew between the Apache and settlers, the Mexican government passed laws offering cash rewards for Apache scalps.

=== Religion ===
Apache religious stories relate to two culture heroes (one of the Sun/fire:"Killer-Of-Enemies/Monster Slayer", and one of Water/Moon/thunder: "Child-Of-The-Water/Born For Water") who destroy several creatures harmful to humankind.

Another story is of a hidden ball game, where good and evil animals decide whether or not the world should be forever dark. Coyote, the trickster, is an important being that often has inappropriate behavior (such as marrying his own daughter, etc.) in which he overturns social convention. The Navajo, Western Apache, Jicarilla, and Lipan have an emergence or Creation Story, while this is lacking in the Chiricahua and Mescalero.

Most Southern Athabascan gods are personified natural forces that run through the universe. They may be used for human purposes through ritual ceremonies. The following is a formulation by the anthropologist Keith Basso of the Western Apache's concept of diyí':

The term diyí' refers to one or all of a set of abstract and invisible forces that are said to derive from certain classes of animals, plants, minerals, meteorological phenomena, and mythological figures within the Western Apache universe. Any of the various powers may be acquired by man and, if properly handled, used for a variety of purposes.

Medicine men learn the ceremonies, which can also be acquired by direct revelation to the individual. Different Apache cultures had different views of ceremonial practice. Most Chiricahua and Mescalero ceremonies were learned through the transmission of personal religious visions, while the Jicarilla and Western Apache used standardized rituals as the more central ceremonial practice. Important standardized ceremonies include the puberty ceremony (Sunrise Dance) of young women, Navajo chants, Jicarilla "long-life" ceremonies, and Plains Apache "sacred-bundle" ceremonies.

Certain animals—owls, snakes, bears, and coyotes—are considered spiritually evil and prone to cause sickness to humans.

Many Apache ceremonies use masked representations of religious spirits. Sandpainting is an important ceremony in the Navajo, Western Apache, and Jicarilla traditions, in which healers create temporary, sacred art from colored sands. Anthropologists believe the use of masks and sandpainting are examples of cultural diffusion from neighboring Pueblo cultures.

The Apaches participate in many religious dances, including the rain dance, dances for the crop and harvest, and a spirit dance. These dances were mostly for influencing the weather and enriching their food resources.

== Population history ==
José de Urrutia estimated the Apache population in year 1700 at up to 60,000 people (or 12,000 warriors). Indian Affairs 1837 estimated the Apache population in 1837 at 20,280 people, this estimate was later repeated by official reports of Indian Affairs 1841 and 1844. In Indian Affairs 1857 "every possible estimate" has been gathered - from 18,000 warriors (which would indicate a total population of 90,000) down to 300. Many estimates did not include the whole body of the tribe and referred only to some bands or to a part of the area they roved over. In 1875 there were already on the reservations 9,248 Apaches (Indian Affairs 1875), this number does not include those who were still not on the reservations. The census of 1890 returned at least 7,218 (including 4,041 in Arizona) and the census of 1910 returned at least 6,119.

During the 20th and 21st centuries Apache population has rebounded, reaching 148,936 in the USA according to the 2020 census.

== Languages ==
The five Apache languages are Apachean languages, which in turn belong to the Athabaskan branch of the Eyak-Athabaskan language family. All Apache languages are endangered. Lipan is reported extinct.

The Southern Athabascan branch was defined by Harry Hoijer primarily according to its merger of stem-initial consonants of the Proto-Athabascan series *k̯ and *c into *c (in addition to the widespread merger of *č and *čʷ into *č also found in many Northern Athabascan languages).

Proto- Athabascan		Navajo	Western Apache	Chiricahua	Mescalero	Jicarilla	Lipan	Plains Apache
*k̯uʔs	"handle fabric-like object"	-tsooz	-tsooz	-tsuuz	-tsuudz	-tsoos	-tsoos	-tsoos
*ce·	"stone"	tsé	tséé	tsé	tsé	tsé	tsí	tséé

Hoijer (1938) divided the Apache sub-family into an eastern branch consisting of Jicarilla, Lipan, and Plains Apache and a Western branch consisting of Navajo, Western Apache (San Carlos), Chiricahua, and Mescalero based on the merger of Proto-Apachean *t and *k to k in the Eastern branch. Thus, as can be seen in the example below, when the Western languages have noun or verb stems that start with t, the related forms in the Eastern languages will start with a k:

	Western				Eastern		
	Navajo	Western Apache	Chiricahua	Mescalero	Jicarilla	Lipan	Plains Apache
"water"	tó	tū	tú	tú	kó	kó	kóó
"fire"	kǫʼ	kǫʼ	kųų	kų	ko̱ʼ	kǫǫʼ	kǫʼ

He later revised his proposal in 1971 when he found that Plains Apache did not participate in the *k̯/*c merger to consider Plains Apache as a language equidistant from the other languages, now called Southwestern Apachean. Thus, some stems that originally started with *k̯ in Proto-Athabascan start with ch in Plains Apache while the other languages start with ts.

Proto- Athabascan		Navajo	Chiricahua	Mescalero	Jicarilla	Plains Apache
*k̯aʔx̣ʷ	"big"	-tsaa	-tsaa	-tsaa	-tsaa	-cha

Morris Opler (1975) has noted cultural similarities of Jicarilla and Lipan with Eastern Apache language speakers and differences from Western Apache speakers, supporting Hojier's initial classification. Other linguists, particularly Michael Krauss (1973), have noted that a classification based only on the initial consonants of noun and verb stems is arbitrary and when other sound correspondences are considered the relationships between the languages appear more complex.

Apache languages are tonal. Regarding tonal development, all Apache languages are low-marked, which means that stems with a "constricted" syllable rime in the proto-language developed low tone while all other rimes developed high tone. Other Northern Athabascan languages are high-marked: their tonal development is the reverse. In the example below, if low-marked Navajo and Chiricahua have a low tone, then the high-marked Northern Athabascan languages, Slavey and Chilcotin, have a high tone, and if Navajo and Chiricahua have a high tone, then Slavey and Chilcotin have a low tone.

		Low-Marked		High-Marked	
Proto- Athabascan		Navajo	Chiricahua	Slavey	Chilcotin
*taʔ	"father"	-taaʼ	-taa	-táʼ	-tá
*tu·	"water"	tó	tú	tù	tù

== Notable historic Apache ==
Contemporary Apache people are listed under their specific tribes, see Category:Apache people. Historic Apache are also listed under their bands:

- Notable Chiricahua Apache
- Notable Jicarilla Apache
- Notable Lipan Apache
- Notable Mescalero Apache
- Notable Mimbreño Apache
- Notable Plains Apache
- Notable Western Apache

== See also ==
- Athabascan languages
- Battle of Apache Pass
- Battle of Cieneguilla
- Camp Grant massacre
- Fort Apache, a historical fictional movie about encounters between the US Army and Cochise's band
- Neoapachella, a monotypic genus of North American mygalomorph spiders in the Euctenizidae named in their honor.

== General bibliography ==
- Basso, Keith H. (1969). "Western Apache witchcraft", Anthropological papers of the University of Arizona (No. 15). Tucson: University of Arizona Press,
- Brugge, David M. (1968). Navajos in the Catholic Church Records of New Mexico 1694–1875. Window Rock, Arizona: Research Section, The Navajo Tribe.
- Brugge, David M. (1983). "Navajo prehistory and history to 1850", in A. Ortiz (Ed.), Handbook of North American Indians: Southwest (Vol. 10, pp. 489–501). Washington, D.C.: Smithsonian Institution.
- Cordell, Linda S. Ancient Pueblo Peoples. St. Remy Press and Smithsonian Institution, 1994. ISBN 0-89599-038-5.
- Etulain, Richard W. New Mexican Lives: A Biographical History, University of New Mexico Center for the American West, University of New Mexico Press, 2002. ISBN 0-8263-2433-9
- Foster, Morris W; & McCollough, Martha. (2001). "Plains Apache", in R. J. DeMallie (Ed.), Handbook of North American Indians: Plains (Vol. 13, pp. 926–939). Washington, D.C.: Smithsonian Institution.
- Gatewood, Charles B. (Edited by Louis Kraft). Lt. Charles Gatewood & His Apache Wars Memoir. University of Nebraska Press, 2005. ISBN 978-0-8032-2772-9.
- Goodwin, Greenville (1969) [1941]. The Social Organization of the Western Apache. Tucson, Arizona: University of Arizona Press. LCCN 76-75453.
- Gunnerson, James H. (1979). "Southern Athapaskan archeology", in A. Ortiz (Ed.), Handbook of North American Indians: Southwest (Vol. 9, pp. 162–169). Washington, D.C.: Smithsonian Institution.
- Haley, James L. Apaches: A History and Culture Portrait. University of Oklahoma Press, 1997. ISBN 0-8061-2978-6.
- Hammond, George P., & Rey, Agapito (Eds.). (1940). Narratives of the Coronado Expedition 1540–1542. Albuquerque: University of New Mexico Press.
- Henderson, Richard. (1994). "Replicating dog 'travois' travel on the northern plains", Plains Anthropologist, 39, 145–59.
- Hodge, F. W. (Ed.). (1907). Handbook of American Indians. Washington.
- Hoijer, Harry. (1938). "The southern Athapaskan languages", American Anthropologist, 40 (1), 75–87.
- Hoijer, Harry. (1971). "The position of the Apachean languages in the Athapaskan stock", in K. H. Basso & M. E. Opler (Eds.), Apachean culture history and ethnology (pp. 3–6). Anthropological papers of the University of Arizona (No. 21). Tucson: University of Arizona Press.
- Huld, Martin E. (1983). "Athapaskan bears", International Journal of American Linguistics, 49 (2), 186–195.
- Krauss, Michael E. (1973). "Na-Dene", in T. A. Sebeok (Ed.), Linguistics in North America (pp. 903–978). Current trends in linguistics (Vol. 10). The Hague: Mouton. (Reprinted 1976).
- Landar, Herbert J. (1960). "The loss of Athapaskan words for fish in the Southwest", International Journal of American Linguistics, 26 (1), 75–77.
- Miles, General Nelson Appleton. (1897). Personal Recollections and Observations of General Nelson A. Miles embracing a brief view of the Civil War, or, From New England to the Golden Gate : and the story of his Indian campaigns, with comments on the exploration, development and progress of our great western empire. Chicago: The Werner Company.
- Opler, Morris E. (1936a). "A summary of Jicarilla Apache culture", American Anthropologist, 38 (2), 202–223.
- Opler, Morris E. (1936b). "The kinship systems of the Southern Athapaskan-speaking tribes", American Anthropologist, 38 (4), 620–633.
- Opler, Morris E. (1941). An Apache life-way: The economic, social, and religious institutions of the Chiricahua Indians. Chicago: University of Chicago Press.
- Opler, Morris E. (1975). "Problems in Apachean cultural history, with special reference to the Lipan Apache", Anthropological Quarterly, 48 (3), 182–192.
- Opler, Morris E. (1983a). "The Apachean culture pattern and its origins", in A. Ortiz (Ed.), Handbook of North American Indians: Southwest (Vol. 10, pp. 368–392). Washington, D.C.: Smithsonian Institution.
- Opler, Morris E. (1983b). "Chiricahua Apache", in A. Ortiz (Ed.), Handbook of North American Indians: Southwest (Vol. 10, pp. 401–418). Washington, D.C.: Smithsonian Institution.
- Opler, Morris E. (1983c). "Mescalero Apache", in A. Ortiz (Ed.), Handbook of North American Indians: Southwest (Vol. 10, pp. 419–439). Washington, D.C.: Smithsonian Institution.
- Opler, Morris E. (2001). "Lipan Apache", in R. J. DeMallie (Ed.), Handbook of North American Indians: Plains (Vol. 13, pp. 941–952). Washington, D.C.: Smithsonian Institution.
- Plog, Stephen. (1997). Ancient peoples of the American Southwest. London: Thames and London, LTD. ISBN 0-500-27939-X.
- Reuse, Willem J., de. (1983). "The Apachean culture pattern and its origins: Synonymy", in A. Ortiz (Ed.), Handbook of North American Indians: Southwest (Vol. 10, pp. 385–392). Washington, D.C.: Smithsonian Institution.
- Schroeder, Albert H. (1963). "Navajo and Apache relationships west of the Rio Grande", El Palacio, 70 (3), 5–23.
- Schroeder, Albert H. (1974a). "A study of the Apache Indian: Parts 1–3", in American Indian ethnology: Indians of the Southwest. New York: Garland.
- Schroeder, Albert H. (1974b). "A study of the Apache Indian: Parts 4–5", American Indian ethnology: Indians of the Southwest. New York: Garland.
- Schroeder, Albert H. (1974c). "The Jicarilla Apache", American Indian ethnology: Indians of the Southwest. New York: Garland.
- Seymour, Deni J. (2004) "A Ranchería in the Gran Apachería: Evidence of Intercultural Interaction at the Cerro Rojo Site", Plains Anthropologist 49(190):153–192.
- Seymour, Deni J. (2009a) "Nineteenth-Century Apache Wickiups: Historically Documented Models for Archaeological Signatures of the Dwellings of Mobile People", Antiquity 83(319):157–164.
- Seymour, Deni J.(2009b) "Evaluating Eyewitness Accounts of Native Peoples along the Coronado Trail from the International Border to Cibola", New Mexico Historical Review 84(3):399–435.
- Seymour, Deni J. (2010a) "Contextual Incongruities, Statistical Outliers, and Anomalies: Targeting Inconspicuous Occupational Events", American Antiquity 75(1):158–176.
- Seymour, Deni J. (2010b) "Cycles of Renewal, Transportable Assets: Aspects of Ancestral Apache Housing", Plains Anthropologist (Spring or Summer issue)
- Sweeney, Edwin R. (1998). Mangas Coloradas: Chief of the Chiricahua Apaches. University of Oklahoma Press. ISBN 0-8061-3063-6
- Terrell, John Upton. (1972). Apache chronicle. World Publishing. ISBN 0-529-04520-6.
- Tiller, Veronica E. (1983). "Jicarilla Apache", in A. Ortiz (Ed.), Handbook of North American Indians: Southwest (Vol. 10, pp. 440–461). Washington, D.C.: Smithsonian Institution.
- Witherspoon, Gary. (1983). "Navajo social organization", in A. Ortiz (Ed.), Handbook of North American Indians: Southwest (Vol. 10, pp. 524–535). Washington, D.C.: Smithsonian Institution.
- Worcester, Donald E. (1992). The Apaches: Eagles of the Southwest, University of Oklahoma Press. ISBN 0-8061-1495-9.
