= NAN Ranch Ruin =

Coordinates: 32°39′16″N 107°50′59″W

The NAN Ranch Ruin site is a Late Pit-house and Classic Mimbres village located along the Mimbres River, at Dwyer, New Mexico and the NAN Ranch was listed on the National Register of Historic Places in 1988. It was occupied by Mimbreños from about 600 to 1140 and is considered an early Mogollon culture site.

Harriet and C.B. Cosgrove conducted the earliest excavations with their son in 1926 and 1927. Extensive excavations occurred from the 1970s through the 1990s of the several phases of occupation and their hunter-gatherer and farming economy. Clues about the Mimbreños culture and social order are gleaned from their artwork and burial remains.

== Geography and climate ==
The Mimbres village at the NAN Ranch lies near the southern edge of the Colorado Plateau about 160 feet (49 m) north-east of the Mimbres River, situated on a terrace about 13 feet (4.0 m) above the river. (Note: Rose states that the site is located 5 m. above the river.) The semi-arid grassland and plateau landscape is located south of Pinyon-juniper woodland. Vegetation in the area includes agave, common curlymesquite, dropseed, grama, prickly pear, sagebrush, sotol, and yucca. There are also examples of riparian vegetation nearby and villagers probably found douglas fir and ponderosa pine within 6.2 miles (10.0 km) of the site. It was likely an ideal area for agriculture due to the long growing season and plentiful water supply.

== Mimbres culture ==
=== Architecture ===
==== Mimbres periods ====
The Mimbres cultural periods are defined by Harry J. Shafer as Early Pithouse, Late Pithouse and Classic period. The Early Pithouse, or Cumbre Phase, is dated from 200 to 400 – 550. The Late Pithouse period included the Georgetown phase (550-650), San Francisco phase (650-750) when maize became an important staple of the diet, and the Three Circle phase (750-1010) when there was a transition from pit-houses to pueblo villages and slightly greater reliance on cultivation of maize. Lastly, the Classic period when cobble masonry architecture was built over Late Pithouse period sites. The Classic period included the Classic phase (1010-1110) and Terminal Classic phase (1110-1140)

==== NAN Ranch village ====
The main village has two layers of structures, which are believed not to have been inhabited at the same time. The lower, or earlier, level is dated about 850-1000 [Three Circle phase] and consists of 16 pit-houses.

The surface level village is dated from about 1108 [Classic period] and consists of three room blocks: the south block has 10 rooms, the east has 49 rooms and the west room block has 50 rooms or more. The East Room Block contained a sturdily built, large rectangular room (31 by 33 feet (9.4 by 10.1 m)) believed to have been used for community ceremonial purposes, much like the later Ancient Pueblo People round kivas. Groupings of interconnected living, work and storage rooms were generally accessed by ladder through the roof of the living room, which also contained a slab-lined hearth and in many cases metates. Some of the rooms, believed to signify ceremonial rooms, had dual-hearths built in benches, sunken floors lined with flagstone, and double masonry walls.

Based upon the burial remains of the South Room Block, it was inhabited by people of prestige and status. More than 40 people's remains were found below the floor of the central room. The South Room Block also had a community room (20 by 20 feet (6.1 by 6.1 m)) that was built sturdily with double and triple walls. In the plazas outside the room blocks were ramadas, outdoor work areas, adobe-lined fire pits, middens, and a cremation area. There were also several pit-houses.

Based upon tree-ring dating, construction continued through 1128. Construction materials and techniques in the 12th century were less reliable and methodical, with poorer quality adobe and rock, that resulted in irregular shaped rooms. Between 1130 and 1150, people left the Mimbres valley and did not return to their previous settlements, marking the end of the Mimbres Classic period.

Due to the similarity of dental remains of the people of NAN Ranch and the later people of the Chihuahuan and Sonoran Desert, the NAN Ranch inhabitants who vacated the Mimbres Valley may have moved south to the Sonoran and Chihuahuan Deserts and helped to populate the Casas Grandes center.

==== Four housing types ====
Four types of housing were found in the NAN Ranch Three Circle phase community. The first was the single-family household which had living rooms for a family. The next housed extended family members with shared work, storage and ceremonial rooms. Larger room blocks, the third tier, consisted of several extended families. The last is the village. The housing groupings became more complex to efficiently support agriculture and maintain extended family relationships and rights.

=== Economy ===
Local animals of use to prehistoric human populations, when the site was occupied, including: jackrabbits, cottontails, rats, mice, roadrunners, doves, hawks, and various reptiles. The animals found in the higher elevations included: bear, elk, black bear, grizzly bear, wolf, rattlesnake, golden eagle. They also gathered or cultivated maize, common bean, squash, goosefeet, pigweed, sunflower, walnut, and pinon nuts.

As the community grew and had greater reliance on cultivation of food like maize and squash, there was need for better water management systems, such as canals and reservoirs. This was likely the precipitating factor in the transition of remote pit-houses to the centralized NAN Ranch village for the man-power to build and support the irrigation systems.

Maize was ground with manos and metates. Cooking pots were used to prepare food. These processing tools were present during the San Francisco Phase and increased in complexity and use during the Three Circle Phase due to greater dependency upon maize. Surplus food was stored in storage pits and granaries. Care was taken to prevent spoiling or consumption by rodents, such as placing seeds and food in jars and storage pits.

=== Material goods ===
==== Pottery and artwork ====
Mimbres’ culture is characterized by ceramic bowls and vessels with red on white with later black on white with paintings of animals, humans and pictures of scrolls. NAN Ranch burials showed that 75 percent of pottery was initially used for cooking and preparing food but ultimately used for burial items. The pottery found at the NAN Ranch site was largely their own, less than 1% of the pottery remnants found were attained through trade.

The NAN Ranch social order includes gender, labor organization, and the role of power that is displayed in the art and pottery. Women are identified in art work by presence of apron with strings hanging from the waist. The apron-wearers were the child care givers, made pottery (like bowls and vessels) and engaged in carrying hunted animals. From the artwork, men wore three different types of hair styles, made baskets, farmed, gathered food, and fished. Women were often pictured alone, while the men were always in groups. Ceremonial imagery – assumed to signify authority, status, and knowledge – had more men than women. An individual with several material possessions is to be thought of in high rank while others are of lower rank. The material possessions were likely made locally as there is little evidence of a trading network among these people during the time period.

Painted inside a bowl found on the site is a ceremonial headdress, like that of Aztec and Mexican culture, that features two human figures. One lies on the ground, his head severed. The other sits atop him, wearing a helmet with a head like the "Horned Serpent" and holding what appears to be the hair of the victim in one hand and yielding a weapon in the other hand. The bodies of the people are painted black, except for a band of white painted across the eyes, similar to other painted images in Mimbres pottery.

==== Other material goods ====
As at some other Classic Mimbres sites, a copper bell was found at the NAN Ranch, evidence of copper fabrication. Turquoise, commonly found at traded in the American Southwestern, was found in small quantities of raw material, pendants (10), and beads (9).

=== Burial ===
There were 222 human burials excavated at NAN Ranch, about 90% of which were made indoors and below ground. The remaining 10% were outdoor burials and were mostly (90%) male. Burial practices encompassed the people's beliefs about transition from the earthly world to the Mimbres spirit world and evolved throughout the Mimbres occupation, becoming more formal and status-based. The males were buried with jewelry and ceramics, while the females were buried with ceramics. Artifacts found with the burial remains of a woman included unfired pottery and tools for making pottery early in the site's history, before the unique Mimbres pottery was made. Large quantities of grave goods were often found in the burial of children.

Examination of the coprolites remains provide insight into treatment of the ill at NAN ranch. A man who died about 1000 had fossilized feces, likely in his colon when he died, that provide some insight into the convalescent care he received, including high levels of willow pollen for pain, mustard pollen possibly for his digestive tract, and very finely ground corn possibly from a thin soup.

Likely because of their work grinding corn, women had a higher incidence of elbow joint and cervical vertebrae osteoarthritis than men. Although there were decided status levels at NAN Ranch, there was no noticeable difference in the health of the individuals. It is theorized that there was no great period of starvation, or "food stress", during the Classic Mimbres period sites, including the NAN Ranch. There was evidence of anemia – caused by a low-iron, low-protein maize diet or parasites – due to the incidence of porotic hyperostosis (36.5%), pitting of the cranial bones, and cribra orbitalia (19.2%), pitting on the eye orbit walls. Analysis of teeth show that the people of the community were closely related to those of the Chihuahuan and Sonoran Desert.

Eagle, hawk and turkey were buried in graves, covered with slabs of stone like human burials, suggesting an important role in the people's culture and beliefs. For instance, below ground of Room 12, a dual-hearth room believed to be used for ceremonial purposes, contained a bird burial near human burials.

== Excavation ==
In 1926 and 1927, Harriet and C.B. Cosgrove and their son Burt were initial excavators at the NAN site, which is near their excavation project, the Swarts Ruin (1924-1927). In the 1970s the Hinton family invited Harry J. Shafer of Texas A&M University to excavate the site, which resulted in 25 years of work on the site through the 1990s.

Fieldwork of Mimbres culture sites conducted by University of New Mexico Mimbres Foundation and directed by Steven LeBlanc was foundational in the understanding of the Mimbres culture, including the NAN Ranch.

== Bibliography ==
- Cosgrove, Harriet & C.B. (2005) The Swarts Ruin: A Typical Mimbres Site in Southwestern New Mexico (Papers of the Peabody Museum), 1932. Cambridge: Peabody Museum Press, Harvard University. ISBN 978-0873650540.
- Ellis, Linda. (2000). Archaeological method and theory: an encyclopedia. New York: Garland Publishing. ISBN 978-0-8153-1305-2.
- Fewkes, J. Walter. (January–March, 1916). "Animal Figures on Prehistoric Pottery from Mimbres Valley, New Mexico." American Anthropologist. Washington, D.C.: American Anthropological Association, Anthropological Society of Washington, American Ethnological Society. 18 (1):535-546.
- Kantner, John. (2004). Ancient Puebloan Southwest. Cambridge University Press. ISBN 0-521-78310-0.
- Minnis, Paul E. (1985). Social Adaption to Food Stress: A Prehistoric Southwestern Example. The University of Chicago Press. ISBN 0-226-53022-1.
- Morgan, William N. (1994). Ancient Architecture of the Southwest. University of Texas Press. ISBN 0-292-75159-1.
- Rose, Carolyn June. (August 2004). Quantitative Analyses of Plant Remains from the NAN Ranch Ruin, Grant County, New Mexico. Master of Arts Thesis, Office of Graduate Studies, Texas A&M University.
- Plog, Stephen. (1997). Ancient Peoples of the American Southwest. London: Thames and Hudson. ISBN 0-500-02116-3.
- Schollmeyer, Karen Gust. (2009). Resource Stress and Settlement Pattern Change in the Eastern Mimbres Area. Ann Arbor: University Microfilms. PhD. Dissertation, Arizona State University, Tempe.
- Shafer, Harry J. (2003). Mimbres Archaeology At The NAN Ranch Ruin. Albuquerque: University of New Mexico Press. ISBN 0-8263-2204-2.
