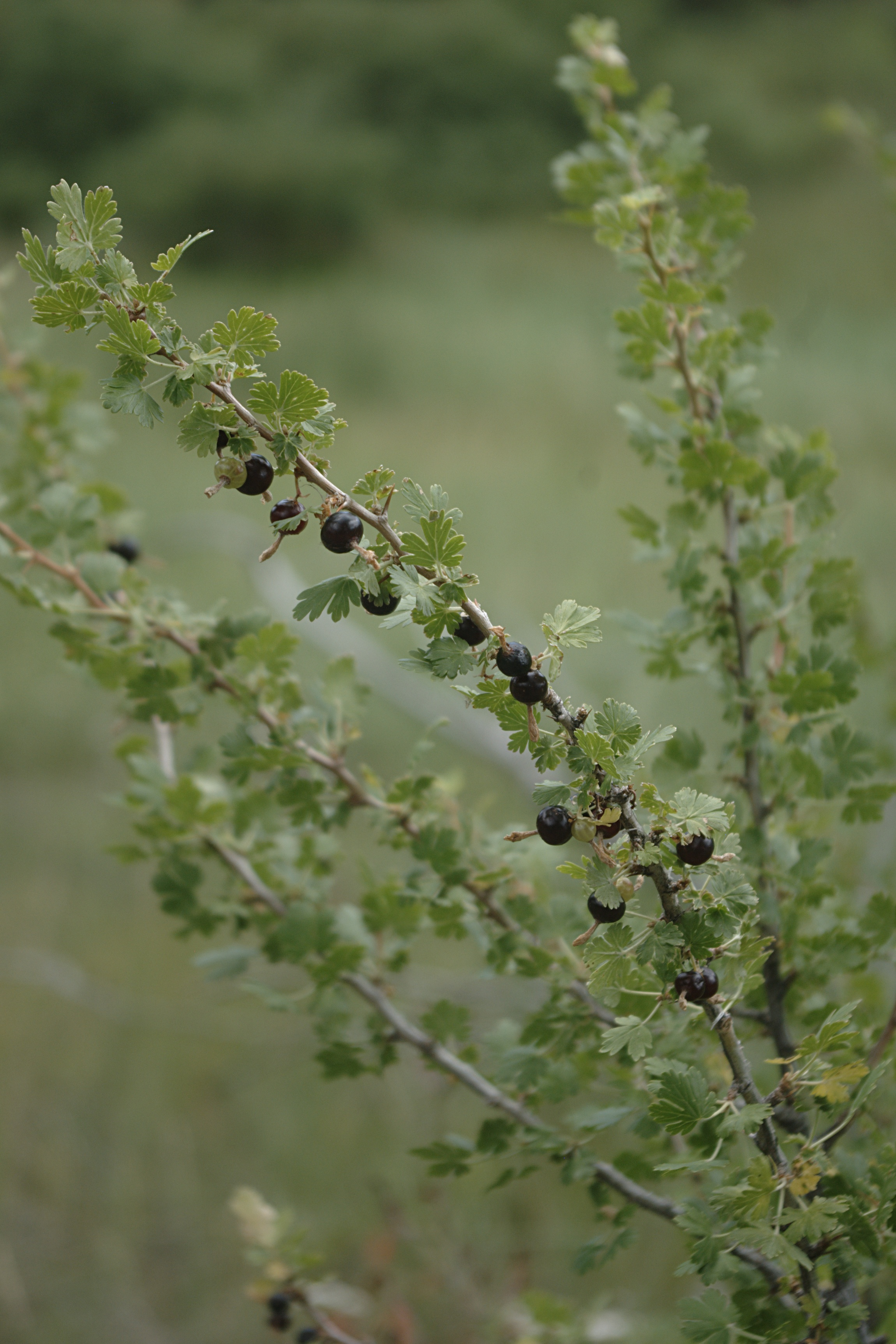

Conservation status
- Apparently Secure (NatureServe)

Scientific classification
- Kingdom: Plantae
- Clade: Tracheophytes
- Clade: Angiosperms
- Clade: Eudicots
- Order: Saxifragales
- Family: Grossulariaceae
- Genus: Ribes
- Species: R. leptanthum

Binomial name
- Ribes leptanthum A.Gray, 1849

Synonyms
- List: Grossularia brachyantha (A.Gray) Petraw. (1932); Grossularia leptantha (A.Gray) Coville & Britton (1908); Ribes leptanthum var. brachyanthum A.Gray (1876); Ribes leptanthum var. genuinum Jancz. (1907); Ribes leptanthum var. veganum Cockerell (1902); Ribes veganum Cockerell (1902)

= Ribes leptanthum =

Trumpet gooseberry

North American currant species

Ribes leptanthum is a spiny-stemmed, small-leaved species of gooseberry in the genus Ribes commonly called trumpet gooseberry. It is native to Arizona, Colorado, New Mexico, Texas, and Utah, where it is usually found in high-altitude canyons.

== Ethnobotany ==
Historically the berries of R. leptanthum have been consumed in Native American cultures in a variety of ways: they are readily eaten fresh by Apache peoples, including the Chiricahua, Mescalero, and other peoples (specifically those in the vicinity of Isleta and Jemez in New Mexico); used as an ingredient in cakes made for overwintering by Chiricahua, and Mescalero peoples; and, in those communities where early-settling Spanish and Native American cultures have generally mingled or influenced each other, R. leptanthum berries are used in recipes for jellies and wines.
