= Salinero Apaches =

Group of Apache people

The Salinero Apaches were an Apache group closely associated with the Mescalero Apaches who lived in the area of what is now western Texas, eastern New Mexico and northern Chihuahua in the 18th century.

The name Salinero, "salt producer", was frequently used by the Spanish to refer to various unrelated Indian groups of northern Mexico (present Tamaulipas, Nuevo León, Coahuila, and Chihuahua) and Texas, that exploited local sources of salt.

The main base of the Salinero Apaches was along the Pecos River in Texas, and their range extended northward along this river into southeastern New Mexico. Sometimes these Salinero Indians were equated with the Natages (Nadahéndé - ″Mescal People″), a powerful band of the Apache which ranged between the Pecos River and Rio Grande. It is clear therefore that the Salineros were Apache Indians and that they were among the groups that eventually became known as Mescalero Apache. The Pecos River was therefore called by the Spanish Rio Salado or also Rio del Natagee after the Salinero Apache or Natages.

The term is often used for other unrelated groups of Hokan stock who lived in what is today Tamaulipas. In the early 17th century, some of the Salinero people of northern Mexico allied with the Acaxee in their war with the Spanish.
