= Ribes pinetorum =

Orange gooseberry

Scientific classification
- Kingdom: Plantae
- Clade: Tracheophytes
- Clade: Angiosperms
- Clade: Eudicots
- Order: Saxifragales
- Family: Grossulariaceae
- Genus: Ribes
- Species: R. pinetorum

Binomial name
- Ribes pinetorum Greene 1881

Synonyms
- Grossularia pinetorum (Greene) Coville & Britton

Species of flowering plant

Ribes pinetorum, the orange gooseberry, is a plant species native to Arizona and New Mexico. It grows in coniferous forests at elevations of 1900–3100 m.

Ribes pinetorum is a shrub up to 2 m (80 inches) tall, lacking prickles on the stems. Flowers are solitary, orange, tubular, hanging. Fruits are purple, spherical, about 13 mm (0.52 inch) across, with spines but considered by many people to be good-tasting.
