= Gary Witherspoon =

American linguist (1943–2022)

Gary J. Witherspoon (July 27, 1943 – June 16, 2022) was a professor of Native American studies at the University of Washington. His area of expertise was the Navajo language and Navajo culture.

== Early life and education ==
Born in 1943 in a Mormon family of Baltimore, Maryland, he attended Ohio State University then served on a Mormon religious mission to the Navajo beginning in 1962 for two years. He married in 1964 and became part of a Navajo family. He received his BS degree in political science from Brigham Young University in 1966.

== Academic career ==
While working on the Navajo Reservation he attended Arizona State University until 1968. At the University of Chicago, he earned his MA and Ph.D. in anthropology in 1970, two years after enrolling. After one year at Yale University, Witherspoon returned to the Dine and focused on research and teaching. His publication record in the early 1970s caught the attention of anthropologists, and he was hired in 1975 by the University of Michigan. In 1979 he was awarded a Guggenheim Fellowship. From 1982 to 1987 he lived among the Navajo. He taught at, and was director of, The Navajo Language Institute, part of the Navajo Academy near Farmington, New Mexico. In 1987 Witherspoon accepted an offer from the University of Washington, where he chaired the American Indian Studies Department.

His book Language and Art in the Navajo Universe is his most significant work. Sheep in Navajo Culture and Social Organization was placed in the centennial version of American Anthropologist as an example of one of the best articles in the field of anthropology in the last 25 years.

=== Bibliography ===
- 1995 Dynamic Symmetry and Holistic Asymmetry in Navajo and Western Art and Cosmology, co-authored with Glen Peterson, Peter Lang Publishing, Inc., New York, N.Y. (April, 1995)
- 1987 Navajo Weaving: Art in its Cultural Context. The Museum of Northern Arizona: Flagstaff, Arizona.
- 1985 Diné Bizaad Bóhoo’aah I. The Navajo Language Institute: Farmington, New Mexico.
- 1977 Language and Art in the Navajo Universe. University of Michigan Press: Ann Arbor, Michigan.
- 1975 Navajo Kinship and Marriage. University of Chicago Press: Chicago, Illinois
- 1969 Navajo Basic Course. Co-authored with Robert Blair and Leon Simmons. Brigham Young University Press: Provo, Utah
- 1968 Black Mountain Boy. Co-authored with Veda Carlson. Navajo Curriculum Center: Rough Rock, Arizona.

=== Selected journal articles ===
- 1980 "Language in Culture and Culture in Language." International Journal of American Linguistics, 46: 1–14.
- 1973 "Sheep in Navajo Culture and Social Organization." American Anthropologist 75:1441–1448.
- 1971 "Navajo Categories of Objects at Rest." American Anthropologist 73: 110–125.
- 1970b "The Role of the Social Scientist in Indian Affairs." Journal of American Indian Affairs (Fall) 1: 18–23.
- 1970a "A New Look at Navajo Social Organization." American Anthropologist 72: 55–65.

== Death ==
He died on June 16, 2022, in Kingman, Arizona, and was buried in Naschitti, New Mexico. He is survived by his wife, Rosette Kisitu Sims; sons, Dwight, David and Johnny; daughter, Deanna; and 16 grandchildren and four great-grandchildren.
