= Stephen Plog =

American archaeologist & anthropologist

Stephen Plog is an American archaeologist and anthropologist specializing in the pre-Columbian cultures of the Southwestern United States. He is a professor at the University of Virginia.

Plog was born in Roswell, New Mexico. When he was six years old, in 1955, he moved with his family to El Paso, Texas. He enrolled at Grinnell College before leaving during his first year to enroll at the University of Texas at El Paso. He transferred to the University of Michigan to finish his undergraduate degree in anthropology while working at the university's Museum of Anthropology. He received a Ph.D. from the University of Michigan in 1977. Plog developed a publicly available online database of over 100 years of data about the Chaco Culture National Historical Park.

He joined the anthropology department of the University of Virginia in 1978 as an assistant professor. He has also served as anthropology department chair, director of undergraduate studies, and associate dean for academic programs in the College and Graduate School of Arts & Sciences. In 2007, he was elected to the National Academy of Sciences.
