= Timeline of women in warfare in the United States before 1900 =

This is a timeline of women in warfare in the United States before 1900.This list includes women who served in the United States Armed Forces in various roles. It also includes women who have been Warriors and fighters in other types of conflicts that have taken place in the United States. This list should also encompass women who served in support roles during military and other conflicts in the United States before the twentieth century.

== 18th century ==
=== 1750s ===
1755

- Nancy Ward, Nan'yhi (Cherokee) received the title of Beloved Woman after fighting in the Battle of Taliwa.

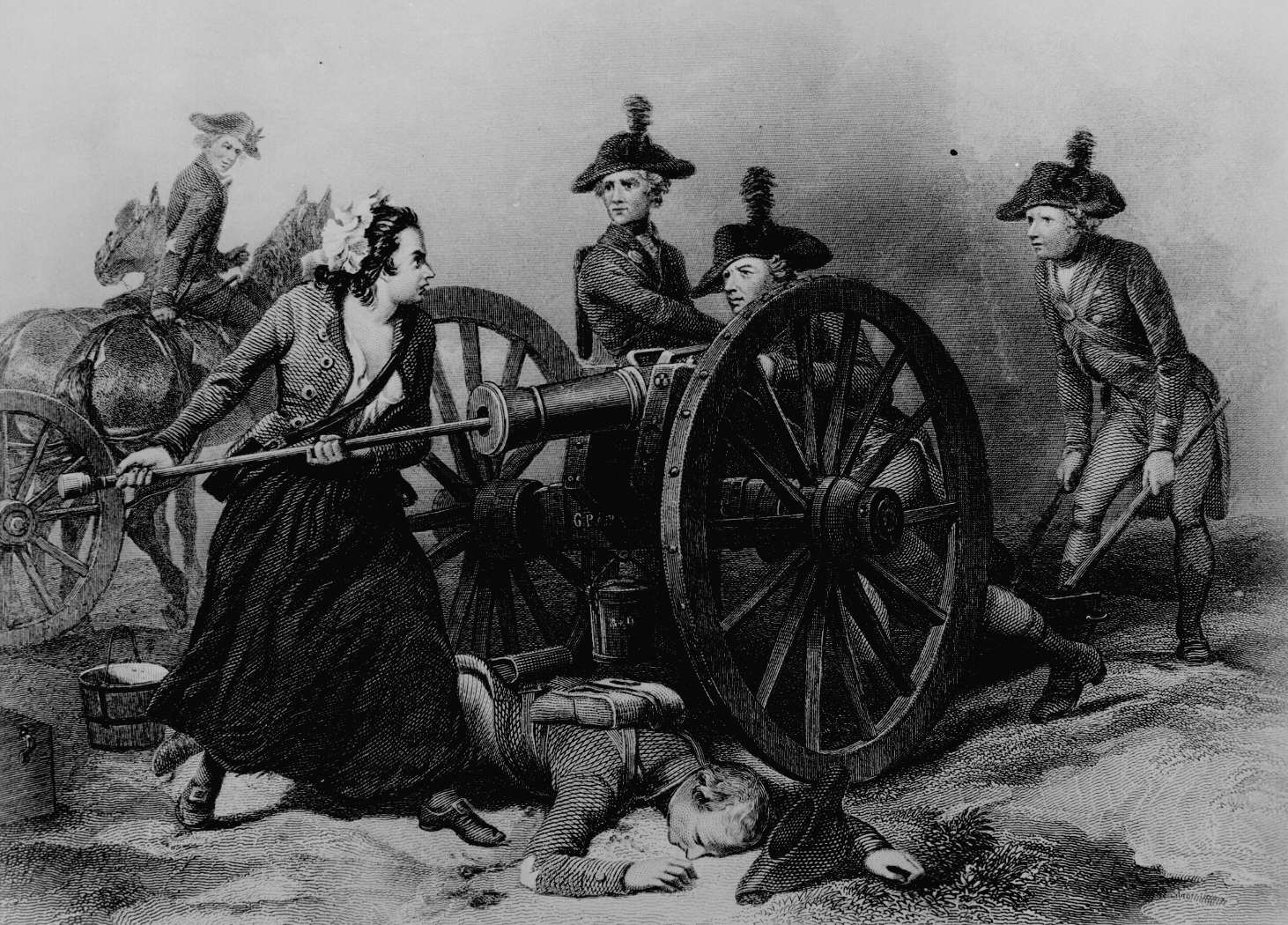
Molly Pitcher engraving

=== 1770s ===
1775

- March: Prudence Wright organized a militia of women in Pepperell, Massachusetts. The militia went on to capture two spies.

1776

- November: Margaret Corbin was wounded fighting next to her husband during the attack of Fort Washington. She eventually earned a military pension for her service.

1777

- April: Sibyl Ludington rode to alert New York militia that the British were burning Danbury; these accounts, originating from the Ludington family, are questioned by modern scholars.

1778

- Mary Hays aided Revolutionary soldiers in the Battle of Monmouth, bringing water and later being known as "Molly Pitcher."

=== 1780s ===
1780

- Esther DeBert Reed raised money for the war effort.

1782

- Deborah Sampson disguised herself as a man and fought under the name, Robert Shurtliff in the Fourth Massachusetts Regiment.

== 19th century ==
- Ojibwa Chief Earth Woman accompanied men on the warpath after claiming to have gained powers from a dream.
- Gouyen, an Apache woman, assassinated a Comanche chief who killed her husband in battle. She later fought beside other Apaches in a battle against a party of miners.
- Pawnee woman Old Lady Grieves The Enemy changed the course of a battle with the Ponca and Sioux by attacking the enemy, thus shaming the men into fighting when they were in retreat.
- Late 19th century: Lozen and Dahteste acted as compatriots to Geronimo in his rebellion against the United States.

=== 1810s ===
1811

- The U.S. Navy included women nurses at its hospitals for the first time in its history.

1812

- During the War of 1812 Mary Marshall and Mary Allen worked as nurses for U.S. Commodore Stephen Decatur on the United States.

1819

- Manono II, fought along with her husband Keaoua Kekuaokalani, in the Battle of Kuamoo, where both perished in defense of the kapu system.

=== 1830s ===
- Women were first officially assigned as keepers in the Lighthouse Service of the U.S. Coast Guard beginning in the 1830s. Previously, many wives and daughters of keepers had served as keepers when their husbands or fathers became ill. Women continued as lighthouse keepers until 1947.

1830

- Pine Leaf of the Crow tribe was recorded as having counted coup.

1836

- The Warner Sisters came to Constitution Island. For a half century, Susan and Anna Warner wrote popular novels and taught Sunday School to West Point cadets. Susan wrote a Wide Wide World, one of the nation's best sellers, in the 1850s. Anna wrote the words to the children's verse "Jesus Loves Me." They later donated the island to the United States Military Academy in 1908. The remains of both sisters were interred in the West Point cemetery.

=== 1840s ===
1842

- Kuilix, a female warrior of the Pend d'Oreilles headed a group of warriors which rescued another group from the Blackfeet. Women of both the Pend d'Oreilles and the related Flathead tribe actively participated in warfare, entering battles and dancing in war dances.

1846

- Mexican War (1846–1848): Elizabeth Newcom enlisted under the name Bill Newcom in the Missouri Volunteer Infantry. She served briefly before being discovered and discharged.
- Sarah Borginnes was hailed as the "Heroine of Fort Brown" following her actions during the Siege of Fort Texas. She went on to operate a series of inns providing food, lodging, liquor, and prostitutes to Zachary Taylor's troops.
- Kuilix participated in a fight against the Crow.

=== 1850s ===
- Woman Chief (Crow) was the third-leading warrior among a group of Crow lodges.

1850

- Hanging Cloud became the first and only woman of the Ojibwa tribe to become a full warrior.

1851

- Eliza Allen published her memoirs about her experiences of disguising herself as a man and fighting in the Mexican–American War.

1858

- Battle of Spokane Plain. Colestah of the Yakama tribe was a participant.

1859

- From 1859 to 1862 Maria Andreu (a.k.a. Maria Mestre de los Dolores) served as the Keeper of the St. Augustine Lighthouse in Florida, becoming the first Hispanic-American woman to serve in the U.S. Coast Guard and the first Hispanic-American woman to oversee a federal shore installation.

=== 1860s ===
- Civil War (1861–1865): Women were involved in civilian volunteer work where they aided troops on both sides of the war. Biologically female soldiers on both sides wore male clothing to serve; some of them, such as Albert Cashier, were transgender men. By the end of the war, over 500 fully paid positions were available to women as nurses and in the United States Military.

1861

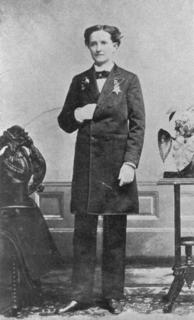
Mary Edwards Walker

- Dorothea Dix was appointed Superintendent of Army Nurses for the Union Army on June 10, 1861, and quickly created and implemented guidelines for nursing candidates. In October 1863, after the U.S. the War Department introduced Order No. 351, which granted both the Surgeon General (Joseph K. Barnes) and the Superintendent of Army Nurses (Dix) the power to appoint female nurses, Dix managed a U.S. Army nursing program that was staffed by more than 3,000 women.
- Dr. Mary Walker was a doctor who served with the Union Army in the First Battle of Bull Run (Manassas) on July 21, 1861, and three later major engagements. Commissioned as a captain, she was captured on April 10, 1864, becoming the first female prisoner of war; she was released on August 12, 1864, in exchange for a Confederate major who was being held as a POW by the Union Army. At war's end, she received the Medal of Honor for her service and for hardships endured as a POW.
- 1861–1863: Lizzie Compton disguised herself as a man and fought on the side of the Union.
- 1861–1865: Harriet Tubman, an abolitionist who had previously been enslaved, served as a scout, nurse, and a spy for the Union Army. As the leader of a band of scouts, she provided key intelligence to Union military leaders, and became the first woman to lead an armed assault during the Civil War in the Raid at Combahee Ferry in 1863. In 1913, Tubman was buried in Ft. Hill Cemetery in Auburn, New York and received full military honors at the service.

1862

- Susan King Taylor became the first African American to work as an army nurse in the United States.
- March 20: Malinda Blalock disguised herself as a man and registered as "Samuel Blalock" in the Confederate military. She fought in three battles with her husband, who was her sergeant.
- April 6–7: Laura J. Williams participated in the Battle of Shiloh with a company that she raised and led, all while disguised as a man.
- Four nuns from Holy Cross and five African American women worked as nurses on the Navy's Red Rover.

1863

- Pauline Cushman, an actress, served on the Union side as a spy dressed in male uniform. She was given a volunteer reserve commission as a major and became known as Miss Major Cushman. By the end of the war in 1865 she was touring the country giving lectures on her exploits as a spy, and was presented by P.T. Barnum in New York.
- Ann Bradford Stokes enlisted as a ship's nurse in the Navy.

1864

- Clara Barton, the "Florence Nightingale of America", was appointed by Union General Benjamin Butler as the "lady in charge" of the hospitals for the Army of the James in 1864. Already known as the "Angel of the Battlefield" for rendering aid to an overwhelmed surgeon following the August 1862 Battle of Cedar Mountain in northern Virginia, as well as for her repeated assistance to troops in the battles of Fairfax Station, Chantilly, Harpers Ferry, South Mountain, Antietam, Fredericksburg, Charleston, Petersburg and Cold Harbor, she came under fire during an incident in which a bullet pierced the sleeve of her dress, traveled through it and killed the soldier she was nursing.
- Rose O'Neal Greenhow worked as a Confederate Spy until her death in October 1864.

1865

- Florena Budwin became the first American woman to be buried in a national cemetery. Prior to her death, she had disguised herself as a man to join the Union Army.
- February 17: Confederate soldier Mollie Bean was captured by Union forces while disguised as a man. When questioned, she said she had served for two years and had been wounded twice.
- March 2: Maria Lewis, a formerly enslaved woman who enlisted with a Union Army regiment under the alias George Harris, and who distinguished herself while serving in the Eighth New York Cavalry, fought for the Union Army in the Battle of Waynesboro, Virginia.

1866

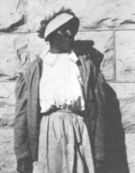
Cathay Williams

- 1866–1868: Cathay Williams, a former Missouri slave, went on to become one of the only women Buffalo Soldiers. Williams took the name, William Cathay, and was able to enlist in the Black infantry. She served from November 15, 1866, to October 14, 1868. When she applied for her Army pension in 1891, it was only then that her true identity was revealed.

1868

- 1868: Battle of Beecher Island. Ehyophsta of the Cheyenne fought in this battle and then also later fought the Shoshone that same year.

=== 1870s ===
1870

- 1870s: Calamity Jane served as a scout in the United States Army.

1872

- 1872–1873: Modoc War. Female Modoc interpreter Toby Riddle assisted in negotiations between the Modoc tribe and the United States.

1876

- Battle of the Rosebud: Referred to by the Cheyenne as "The Battle Where the Girl Saved Her Brother" because of the actions of Buffalo Calf Road Woman (Northern Cheyenne), who charged into battle to save her wounded brother, which caused the Cheyenne to rally and to defeat George Crook. The Other Magpie, a Crow woman, fought on the opposite side.
- Battle of Little Big Horn. Buffalo Calf Road Woman, Minnie Hollow Wood, Moving Robe Woman, and One Who Walks With the Stars participated.

1878

- Noted warrior, Running Eagle (Blackfeet Tribe), died while stealing horses for battle.

=== 1880s ===
1881

- Lime Rock Lighthouse Keeper Ida Lewis became the first woman to be awarded a Gold Lifesaving Medal by the U.S. Coast Guard.

1886

- Dahteste (Choconen Apache) worked as a mediator during the final surrender of Geronimo (Mescalero-Chiricahua).

=== 1890s ===
1898

- Spanish–American War: During an epidemic of typhoid, malaria, and yellow fever, Dr. Anita Newcomb McGee proposed that the Daughters of the American Revolution (DAR) work as contract nurses to help soldiers suffering from the epidemic. Approximately 1,500 women ultimately became civilian contract nurses; roughly thirty-two were African American women, many of whom who were thought to be immune to many of the diseases in the epidemic. Of the twenty female contract nurses who later died due to their service, three were African American. Eighty additional African American women worked as professional contract nurses. Dr. McGee was appointed Acting Assistant Surgeon General, becoming the first woman to hold that position. She was also tasked with creating legislation for a permanent corps of nurses in the Army.

== See also ==
- Women in 18th century warfare
- Women in warfare and the military (1900–1945)
- Women in warfare and the military (1945–1999)
- Women in warfare and the military (2000–present)
