= Timeline of women in war in the United States, pre-1945 =

Aspect of women's history

This is a timeline of women in warfare in the United States up until the end of World War II. It encompasses the colonial era and indigenous peoples, as well as the entire geographical modern United States, even though some of the areas mentioned were not incorporated into the United States during the time periods that they were mentioned.

See also: Timeline of women in warfare in the United States from 1900 to 1949.

== Timeline of women in war in the United States, Pre-1945 ==
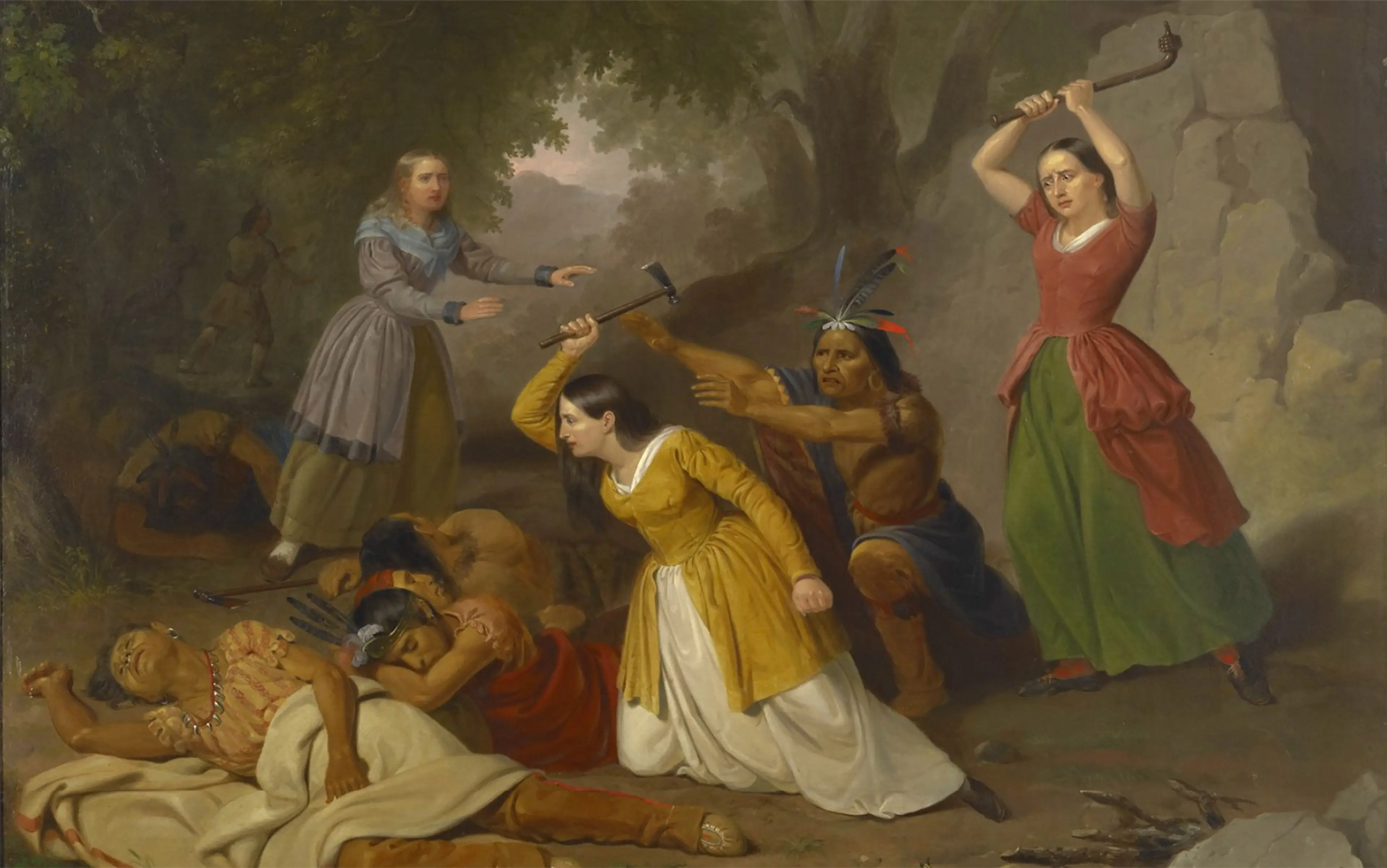
Hannah Duston

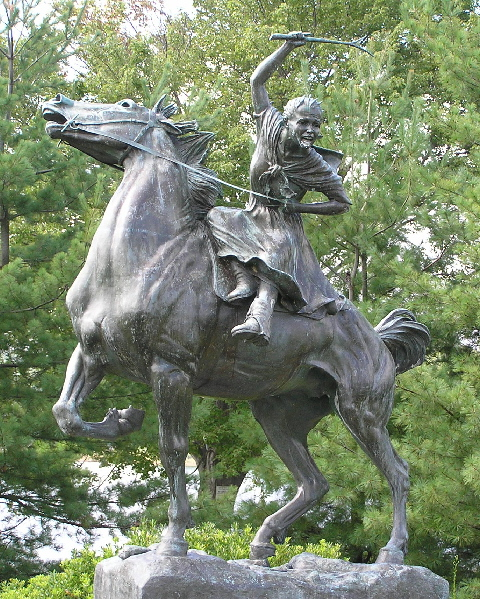
Sybil Ludington

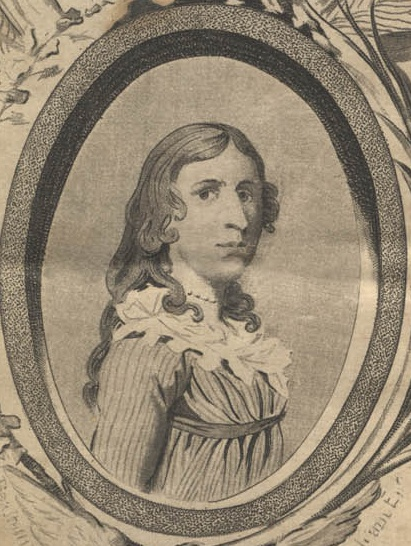
Deborah Sampson

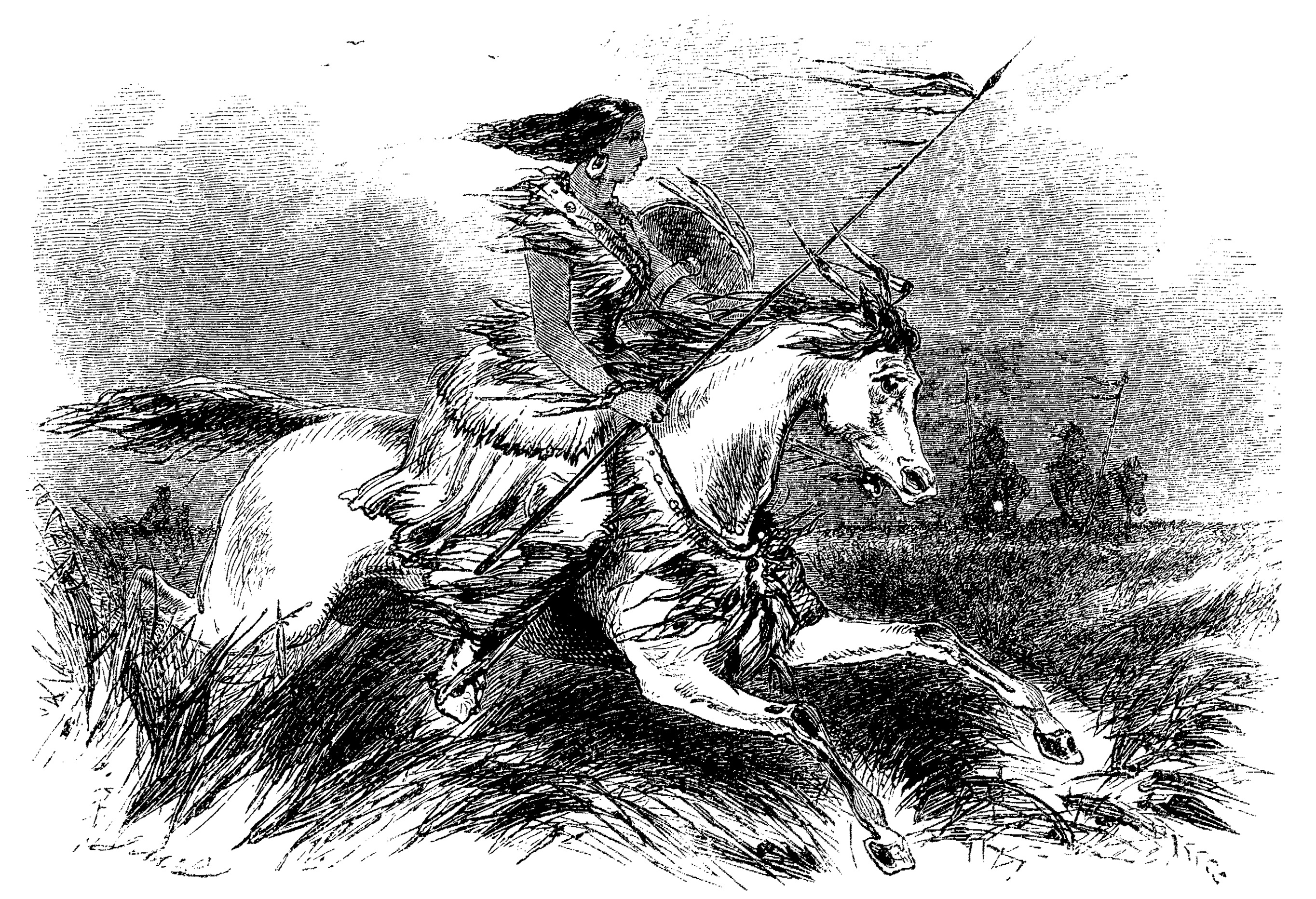
Pine Leaf

Kuilix

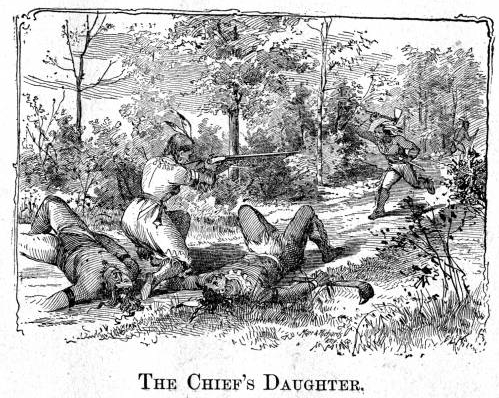
Hanging Cloud

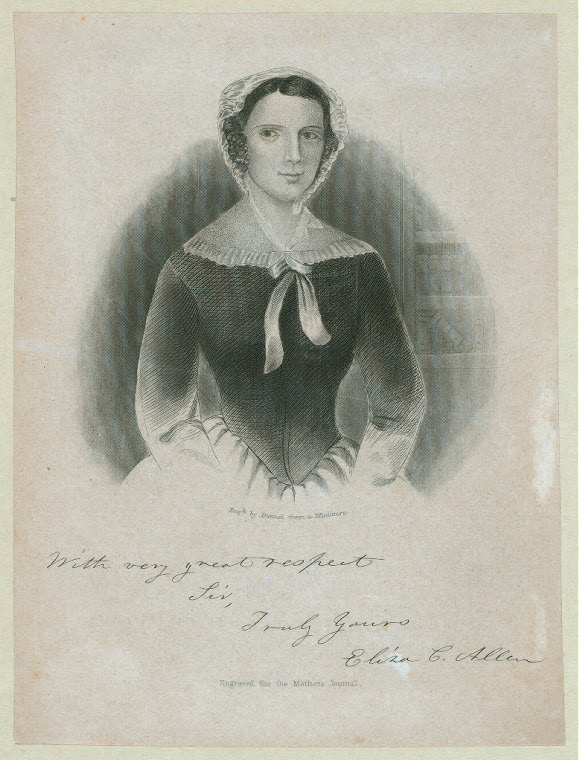
Eliza Allen

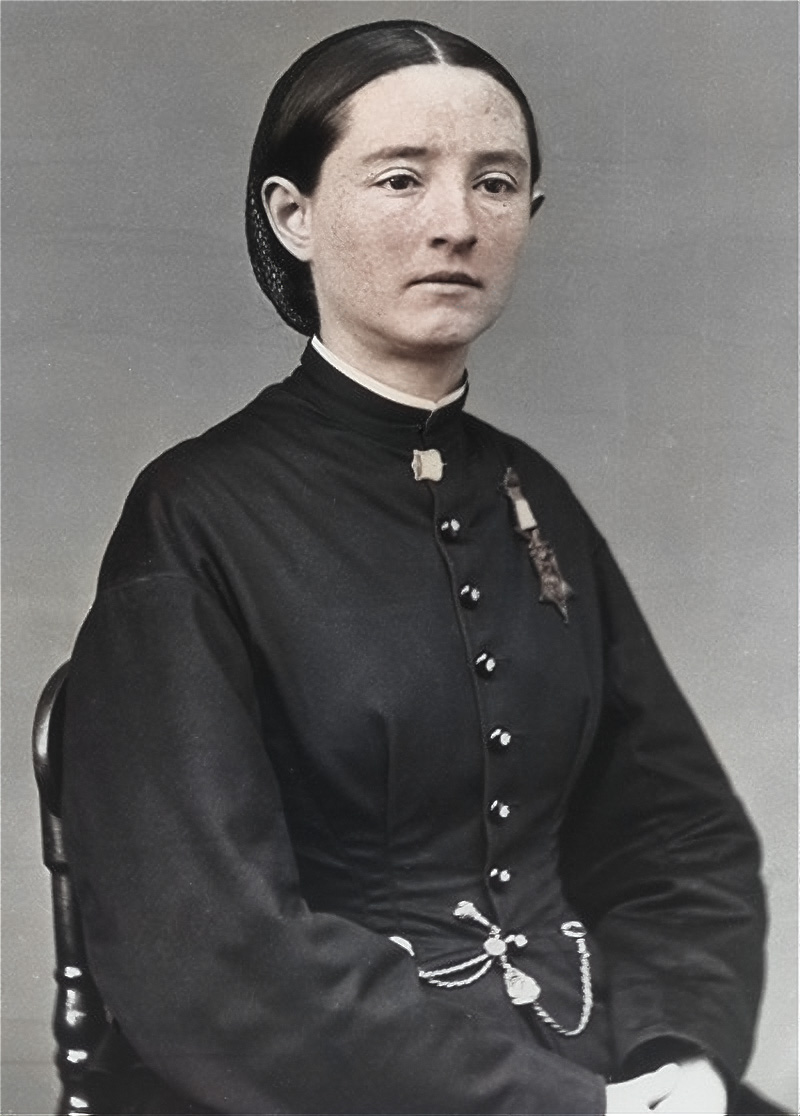
Mary Edwards Walker

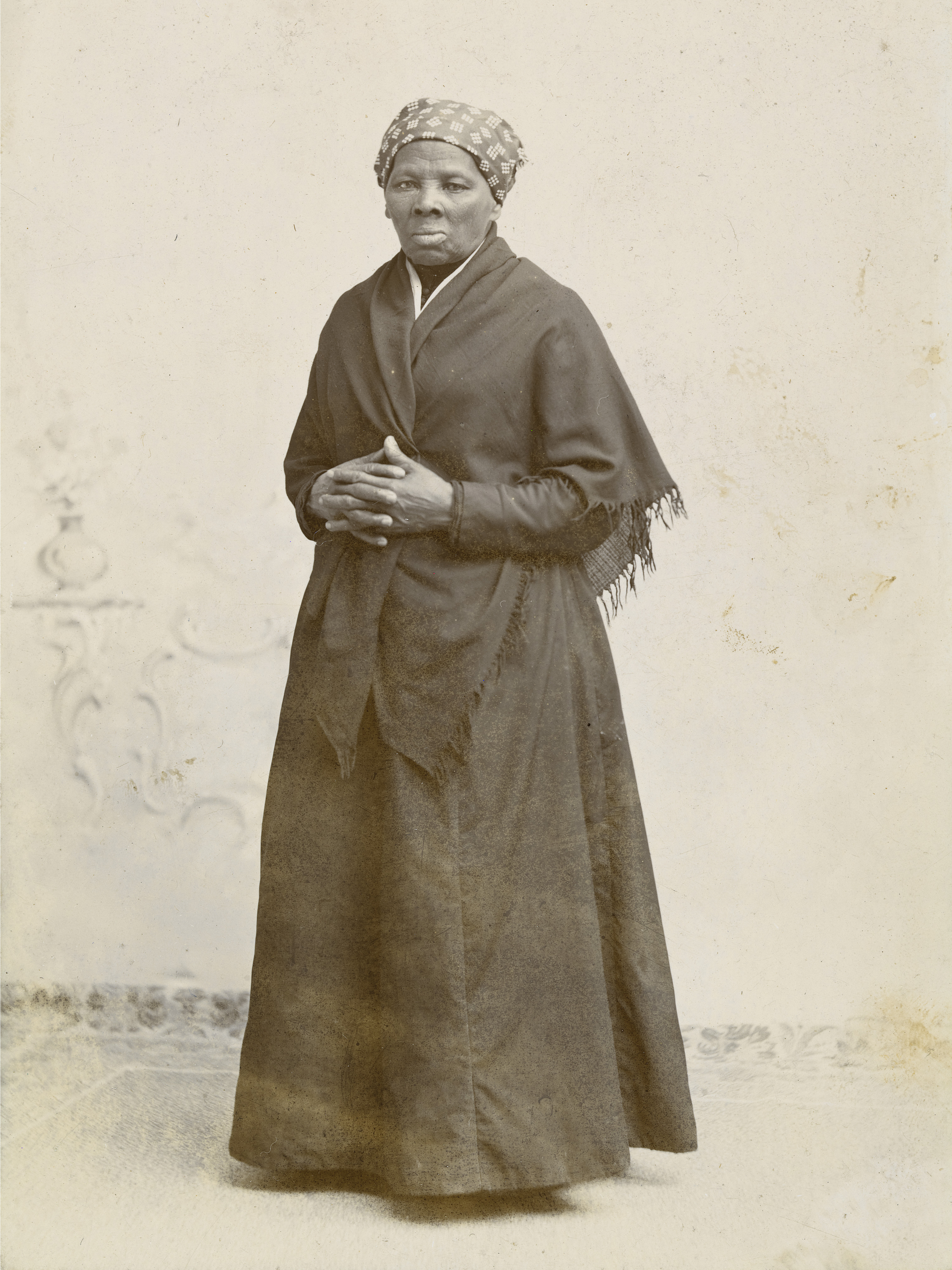
Harriet Tubman

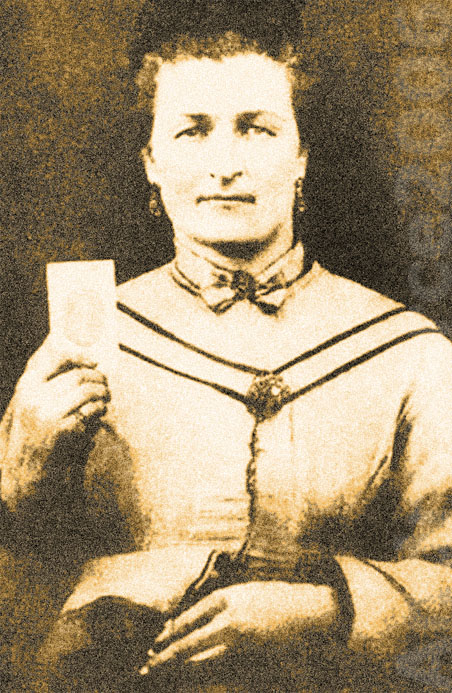
Malinda Blalock

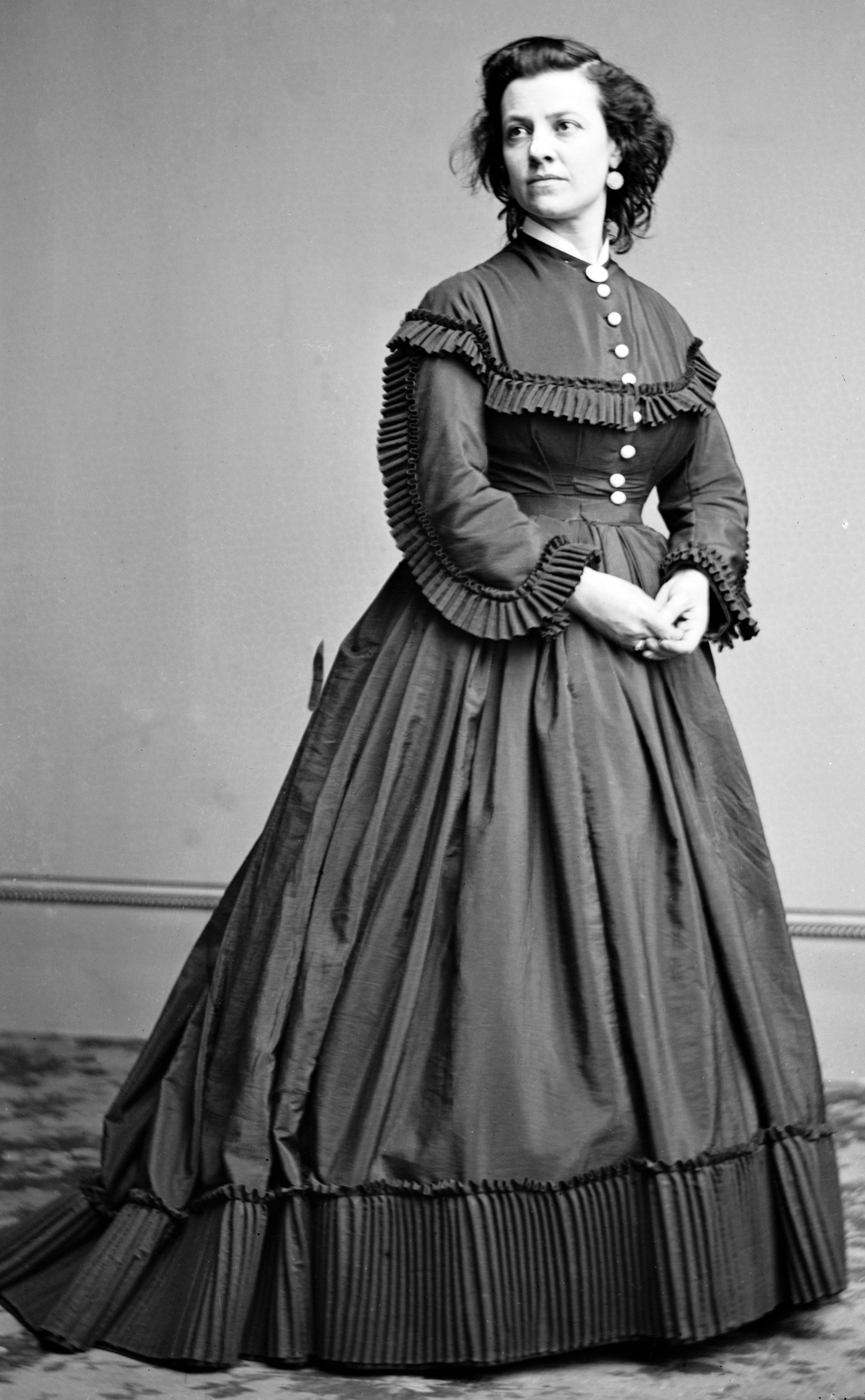
Pauline Cushman

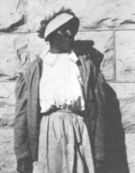
Cathay Williams

=== Early Modern era ===
- 1675–1676: King Philip's War. Awashonks, female chief of the Sakonnet tribe, initially supports Metacomet, but later makes peace with the colonists.
- 1697: New England colonist Hannah Duston is captured by Abenaki Native Americans during a raid. She kills ten of them while they were asleep and escapes with the other prisoners, taking their scalps with her.

=== 18th century ===
- 1755: Cherokee leader Nancy Ward fights side-by-side with her husband at the Battle of Taliwa. When her husband is killed, she picks up his rifle and leads the Cherokee to victory.

==== Revolutionary War ====
- 1770s: Cuhtahlatah, a Cherokee woman, inspires the Cherokee to rally and win a battle by attacking the enemy.
- 1770s: Elizabeth Hutchinson Jackson, the mother of Andrew Jackson, treats and nurses American prisoners of war on a British prison ship, eventually contracting cholera and dying as a result.
- 1775: On Dec. 11, 1775, Jemima Warner was killed during the American invasion of Quebec, possibly by grapeshot. Warner had originally accompanied her husband, Private James Warner of Thompson's Pennsylvania Rifle Battalion, to Quebec because she feared that he would become sick on the campaign trail and she wanted to nurse him. When PVT Warner eventually died in the wilderness en route to Quebec, Mrs. Warner buried him and stayed with the battalion as a cook.
- November 16, 1776: Margaret Corbin assists her husband in manning the cannons while fighting a column of advancing Hessian troops. When her husband is killed, she mans the cannons alone. She later became the first woman to earn a military pension.
- 1776–1782: During the American Revolution, women served on the battlefield as nurses, water bearers, cooks, launderers and saboteurs.
- April 26, 1777: Sybil Ludington is said to have warned colonists about an impending British attack on Danbury, Connecticut during the American Revolution; these accounts, originating from the Ludington family, are questioned by modern scholars.
- 1778: Molly Pitcher (born Mary Ludwig in 1754) married John Hays in 1769. Her husband fought for the Continental Army at the Battle of Monmouth (New Jersey) on June 28, 1778. During the battle, she brought pitchers of water to her husband and fellow soldiers, thus earning the appellation Molly Pitcher. When her husband succumbed to exhaustion, she took his place swabbing and loading his cannon.
- 1778–1781: Ann Bates serves as a spy for Loyalists during the Revolutionary War.
- 1781: A woman called "Miss Jenny" serves as a spy for the British during the American Revolutionary War.
- 1781: Kate Barry warns American forces that a British force was approaching their position before the Battle of Cowpens. Her warning gives the Americans enough time to prepare and win the battle.
- 1782–1783: Deborah Sampson serves in the American army during the American Revolutionary War while disguised as a man. She is the first known American woman to join the military, the first to fight in combat, and the first to receive a military pension.

==== Post–Revolutionary War ====
- October 25, 1785: Toypurina, a Tongva medicine woman, rebels against the Spanish, leading an attack against Mission San Gabriel Arcángel.

=== 19th century ===
- 19th century: Ojibwa Chief Earth Woman accompanies men on the warpath after claiming to have gained powers from a dream.
- 19th century: Gouyen, an Apache woman, assassinates a Comanche chief who killed her husband in battle. She later fought beside other Apaches in a battle against a party of miners.
- 19th century: Pawnee woman Old Lady Grieves The Enemy changes the course of a battle with the Ponca and Sioux by attacking the enemy, thus shaming the men into fighting when they were in retreat.
- 1811: Female nurses first included among personnel at U.S. Navy hospitals.
- War of 1812: Mary Marshall and Mary Allen nursed aboard U.S. Commodore Stephen Decatur's ship United States.
- 1819: Manono II, fought along with her husband Keaoua Kekuaokalani, in the Battle of Kuamoo, where both perished in defense of the Kapu system.
- 1830s: Women were first officially assigned as keepers in the Lighthouse Service of the U.S. Coast Guard beginning in the 1830s although many wives and daughters of keepers had previously served as keepers when their husbands or fathers became ill. Women continued as lighthouse keepers until 1947.
- 1836: The Warner Sisters come to Constitution Island . For a half century, Susan and Anna Warner wrote popular novels and taught Sunday School to West Point cadets. Susan wrote a Wide Wide World, one of the nation's best sellers, in the 1850s. Anna wrote the words to the children's verse “Jesus Loves Me.” They later donated the island to the United States Military Academy in 1908. The remains of both sisters lie in the West Point cemetery.
- 1830s–1850s: Woman Chief (c. 1806–1858) was a chief and leading warrior of the Crow. She earned fame in battle and sat on the Council of Chiefs, where she ranked third among the chiefs of 160 lodges. She married four wives and was later involved in peace treaty efforts. She may be identified with James Beckwourth's Pine Leaf.

=== 1840s ===
- 1842: Kuilix, a female warrior of the Pend d'Oreilles leads a group of warriors to rescue another group from the Blackfeet. Women of both the Pend d'Oreilles and the related Flathead tribe actively participated in warfare, entering battles and dancing in war dances.
- Mexican–American War (1846–1848): Elizabeth Newcom enlists in Company D of the Missouri Volunteer Infantry as Bill Newcom. She marches 600 miles from Missouri to winter camp at Pueblo, Colorado, before she is discovered to be a woman and discharged. In 1846 Sarah Borginnes is hailed as the "Heroine of Fort Brown" following her actions during the Siege of Fort Texas. She goes on to operate a series of inns providing food, lodging, liquor, and prostitutes to Zachary Taylor's troops.
- 1846: Kuilix participates in a fight against the Crow.

=== 1850s ===
- 1850s: Hanging Cloud becomes the first and only woman of the Ojibwa tribe to become a full warrior.
- 1850: Female Blackfoot war chief Running Eagle is killed in battle.
- 1851: Eliza Allen publishes her memoirs about her experiences of disguising herself as a man and fighting in the Mexican–American War.
- 1858: Colestah accompanies Chief Kamiakin Battle of Four Lakes (or Battle of Spokane Plains) against Colonel George Wright, armed with a stone war club, vowing to fight by his side. According to the historian of criminal justice, Kurt R. Nelson, she dressed formally for the battle in "her finest" buckskin dress, with her hair braided tightly.
- 1859: From 1859 to 1862 Maria Andreu (a.k.a. Maria Mestre de los Dolores) served as the Keeper of the St. Augustine Lighthouse in Florida, becoming the first Hispanic-American woman to serve in the U.S. Coast Guard and the first Hispanic-American woman to oversee a federal shore installation.

=== Civil War era ===
Historian Elizabeth D. Leonard writes that, according to various estimates, between 500 and 1,000 women enlisted as soldiers on both sides of the American Civil War, disguised as men. Women also served as spies, resistance activists, nurses, and hospital personnel. Women provided casualty care and nursing to Union and Confederate troops at field hospitals and on the Union Hospital Ship USS Red Rover. Female assigned at birth soldiers on both sides wear male clothing in order to serve; some of them, such as Albert Cashier, may have been transgender men. By the end of the war, over 500 fully paid positions were available to women as nurses and in the United States Military.

- 1861: Dr. Mary Walker was a doctor with the Union Army at the First Battle of Bull Run (Manassas) and three later major engagements, but was later captured and spent the remainder of the war as a prisoner of war. She held the rank of captain. She was the first American female prisoner of war; she was captured on April 10, 1864, when she took a wrong turn while trying to get to a sick patient. The Confederates imprisoned her in the military prison in Richmond, VA, known as "Castle Thunder", and she was released on August 12, 1864, in exchange for a Confederate major. At war's end, she received the Medal of Honor for her service and for hardships endured as a POW. She is the only female to ever receive this honor. When the criteria for awarding the medal changed in 1917, Dr. Walker's medal was rescinded along with 900 others, but in 1977, due to the persistent efforts of the Walker family, the Army Board of Corrections reviewed the case and reversed the 1917 decision, thus restoring the Medal of Honor to Dr. Walker.
- 1861–1863: Lizzie Compton disguises herself as a man and fights on the side of the Union in the American Civil War.
- 1861–1865: Harriet Tubman, an abolitionist and a former slave, becomes a Union spy. She also served as a scout and nurse, and she passed undetected through Confederate lines and acted as a liaison between Union troops and recently freed black slaves. She led a band of scouts and provided key intelligence to the Union Army. Tubman became the first woman to lead an armed assault during the Civil War in the Raid at Combahee Ferry in 1863. In 1913, Tubman was buried with full military honors at Ft. Hill Cemetery, Auburn, NY.
- 1862: Susan King Taylor, at fourteen, becomes the first African American army nurse in the United States.
- March 20, 1862: Malinda Blalock disguises herself as a man and registers as "Samuel Blalock" in the Confederate military. She fights in three battles with her husband, who was her sergeant.
- April 6–7, 1862: Laura J. Williams participates in the Battle of Shiloh with a company that she raised and led, all while disguised as a man.
- 1862: Four sisters of the Holy Cross and five black women served aboard the Navy's first hospital ship, USS Red Rover, to provide medical care.
- 1863: Pauline Cushman, an actress, served on the Union side as a spy dressed in male uniform. She was given a volunteer reserve commission as a major by President Abraham Lincoln, and became known as Miss Major Cushman. By the end of the war in 1865 she was touring the country giving lectures on her exploits as a spy, and was presented by P.T. Barnum in New York.
- 4 January 1864: Sophronia Smith Hunt joined Co. C of the 29th Iowa Infantry with her husband, dressing and serving as a man for about two months. After she was discovered, she remained as a battlefield nurse until her husband's death in October 1864.
- January 25, 1865: Florena Budwin dies and becomes the first American woman to be buried in a national cemetery. She had disguised herself as a man in order to fight on the side of the Union Army in the American Civil War.
- February 17, 1865: Confederate soldier Mollie Bean is captured by Union forces in the American Civil War while disguised as a man. When questioned, she said she had served for two years and that she was wounded twice.

=== Post–Civil War to 1900s ===
- 1866–1868: The only known female Buffalo Soldier was Cathay Williams, a Missouri slave. She disguised herself as a man, William Cathay, and enlisted in one of six black infantry units after the Civil War. She served from November 15, 1866, until her discharge on October 14, 1868, and her true identity was not discovered until she applied for an Army pension in 1891.
- 1868: Battle of Beecher Island takes place. Ehyophsta of the Cheyenne fights in it and later fights the Shoshone that same year.
- 1870s: Calamity Jane serves as a scout in the United States Army.
- 1870s: Gouyen, an Apache woman, assassinates a Comanche chief who killed her husband in battle. She later fought beside other Apaches in a battle against a party of miners.
- 1872–1873: Modoc War. Female Modoc interpreter Toby Riddle assists in negotiations between the Modoc tribe and the United States.
- 1876: Battle of the Rosebud. The Cheyenne refer to this battle as "The Battle Where the Girl Saved Her Brother" because of the actions of Buffalo Calf Road Woman, who charged into battle to save her wounded brother, causing the Cheyenne to rally and to defeat George Crook. The Other Magpie, a Crow woman, fought on the opposite side.
- 1876: Battle of Little Big Horn. Buffalo Calf Road Woman, Minnie Hollow Wood, Moving Robe Woman, and One Who Walks With the Stars participate.
- 1881: Lime Rock Lighthouse Keeper Ida Lewis becomes the first woman to be awarded a Gold Lifesaving Medal by the U.S. Coast Guard.
- 1889: First documented Native American U.S. Army nurses: Susan Bordeaux, Ella Clark, Anna B. Pleets, Josephine Two Bears (all Lakota).
- 1898: Spanish–American War (1898): Thousands of US soldiers sick with typhoid, malaria, and yellow fever overwhelm the capabilities of the Army Medical Department. Dr. Anita Newcomb McGee suggests to the Army Surgeon General that the Daughters of the American Revolution (DAR) be appointed to select professionally qualified nurses to serve under contract to the US Army. Before the war ends, 1,500 civilian contract nurses are assigned to Army hospitals in the US, Hawaii, Cuba, Puerto Rico, Guam and the Philippines, as well as to the Hospital Ship Relief. Twenty nurses die. 32 black women serve as Army contract nurses during the Spanish–American War. The 32 were thought to be immune to yellow fever during the yellow fever and typhoid epidemics, but at least three of them die from their exposure to the illness. A total of 80 African-American professional nurses serve under contract with the Army, including five graduates from the prestigious Tuskegee Institute. The Army appoints Dr. McGee Acting Assistant Surgeon General, making her the first woman ever to hold the position. The Army is impressed by the performance of its contract nurses and asks Dr. McGee to write legislation creating a permanent corps of nurses.
- Late 19th century: Lozen and Dahteste act as compatriots to Geronimo in his rebellion against the United States.

=== 1900–1917 ===
- 1901: The United States establishes the Army Nurse Corps as a permanent part of the Army. The Corps remains all-female until 1955.
- 1908: The United States establishes the Navy Nurse Corps on 13 May. The Corps remains all-female until 1965. The first 20 nurses (known as the Sacred Twenty) report to Washington, D.C. in October 1908. By the end of World War I, their numbers increase to 1,386. During the war, the nurses serve on transport duty overseas in the British Isles.
- 1913: U.S. Navy nurses (all women) serve on the transports USS Mayflower and USS Dolphin.

== World War I ==
See American women in World War I

== 1920s ==
- 1920: A provision of the Army Reorganization Act grants U.S. military nurses the status of officers, with "relative rank" from second lieutenant to major (but not full rights and privileges). U.S. nurses (all women) serve aboard the first U.S. ship built as a floating hospital, the USS Relief (AH-1).

== See also ==
- American women in World War I
- American women in World War II
- Timeline of women in warfare in the United States from 1900 to 1949
- Timeline of women in warfare in the United States from 1950 to 1999
- Timeline of women in warfare and the military in the United States, 2000–2010
- Timeline of women in warfare and the military in the United States, 2011–present
- Women in the military
