= List of Blueberry characters =

This is a list of the main characters of the Blueberry comic/graphic novel series, with their basic characteristics, their role in the series and their contribution in the plot. Only the characters of the main series are presented, not from the spin-off series Young Blueberry – excepting the first three books from original creators Jean Giraud and Jean-Michel Charlier (part of the main series initially) – , and Marshal Blueberry as created by artists, other than the original creating duo. The number of appearances of each characters is that from the original Franco-Belgian publications. Spelling and affiliation are from those titles as released in English, where applicable. Otherwise, the spelling and affiliation are adhered to as featured in the original French-language publications.

== Heroes ==
Michael Steven Donovan, born on 30 October 1843 near Augusta, Georgia, is the main character of the eponymous series. Donovan is the son of a rich Southern farmer and starts out as a dedicated racist. After being framed for the murder, he did not commit, of plantation owner Tucker, the father of his fiancée Harriet, he flees and is saved by the escaped African-American slave Long Sam, who pays with his life for his act of altruism. He becomes an enemy of discrimination of all kinds, fighting against the Confederates (although being a Southerner himself), and trying to protect the rights of Native Americans. He chooses the surname "Blueberry" as alias when fleeing from his Southern enemies (inspired when he looks at a blueberry bush), starting with his adventures as a lieutenant in the United States Cavalry shortly after the American Civil War.

Jimmy McClure is an old gold prospector but he is above all a great drinker. Blueberry was advised by General Crook to ask him for some information about Indians because he was known as a specialist in the matter. Blueberry's best friend, he helped him in several of his adventures, often saving him, but also causing some unexpected problems, not rarely because of his fondness for the bottle. However, in the final part of Blueberry's life, at Tombstone, he did not appear at all. (appears in 17 albums)

"Red Neck", as an expert about Indians matters, was sent by General Dodge to Fort-Navajo to meet Lieutenant Blueberry. From then, he helped him in some of his missions. Though much more introverted and lonesome than McClure, he is a faithful friend to Blueberry. (appears in 11 albums)

== Recurring characters, friends and foes ==
General "Golden Mane" Allister, determined to exterminate the Cheyenne and Sioux tribes, was sent by Washington to subjugate Indians in 1867. He could not prevent the peace from being signed. Later, he tried to assassinate President Grant. He was killed by Blueberry after making a last attempt on Grant's life. (appears in 3 albums)

Wally Blount, with his mate and partner "Crazy" Cole Timbley, was a smart serial killer. Searching for the golden mine of the Superstition Mountains, he chased Prosit Luckner and forced him to lead him to the mine, but he was killed by a snake put by Prosit in his boot. (appears in 2 albums)

Captain Finley is a former Confederate officer. Instead of surrendering, after having deserted the Confederate forces, he fled to Mexico where he looted with his band, made out of members of his former command. In 1866, he helped Blueberry destroy a Mexican convoy of arms destined for the Apaches, contributing to establish peace again. In 1869, searching for the Confederate treasury, he became Blueberry's rival but was killed. Finlay was actually killed by his staunch compatriot, former Confederate sergeant Kimball, after the latter found out that Finlay, who wanted to continue his deprivations, had withheld from his men the pardon the band had received from President Grant in recognition of the help they had provided Blueberry earlier in Mexico, denying him and the others the opportunity to return to their families in the former Confederacy years previously. All of Finlay's men perished in his relentless pursuit for the gold. (appears in 5 albums)

Chihuahua Pearl is a former chorus girl. She was wooed by Lopez, a Mexican prison governor, and was ostentatiously ready to marry him for money. However, she had been more interested in the treasury of the Confederates, having actually already married its keeper, former Confederate colonel Trevor, as a ploy to pry the location out of him, something she never succeeded in. When she resumed the hunt for the hidden cache, she became occasionally allied with Blueberry. Despite the adversary nature of their relationship there was a sexual tension between the two as observed by his friend Red Neck, and served as the rationale for why she afterwards agreed to become party in a plot to free Blueberry from US Army imprisonment. Blueberry later fell in love with her but did not succeed in marrying her, despite a spectacular abduction from a church, she instead opting to marry the initially left at the altar Duke Stanton after all. Stanton, a wealthy railroad baron, exceedingly jealous but unaware of her checkered past, knows her as Lily Caloway only. (appears in 6 albums)

Chini is Cochise's daughter. Vittorio and Blueberry vied in a hard competition for her affections, the former in order to succeed Cochise. It actually was Blueberry's ill-conceived attempt to impress Chini, when he and several Navajo friends ambushed a stage coach carrying "Wild Bill" Hickok, that alerted US authorities to the fact that the alleged would-be assassin of President Grant was still alive, causing the hunt for the former lieutenant to resume, eventually endangering Cochise's tribe as well. Chini once met Chihuahua Pearl in person and exhibited jealousy, as she sensed the attraction between her and Blueberry. She was previously critically wounded by scalp hunter Gideon "Eggskull" O'Bannon when she tried to help Blueberry escape from him, but survived her wounds with the help from a US Army surgeon. She played an important role during the escape of her tribe to Mexico in the winter of 1871/1872, and eventually threw in her lot with Vittorio. (appears in 3 albums)

Colonel Clark is Blueberry's commanding officer at Fort Navajo. A gruff no-nonsense career officer he is the successor of Blueberry's previous commanding officer at the fort, Colonel Dixon, who had died pursuant being bitten by a rattle snake. Often aghast at his subordinate's unruly nature, he is only too happy to send him on detached missions, whenever he is able to. Nevertheless, he – though he will never admit to the fact – is fond of Blueberry and has a begrudging respect for his undeniable abilities and the loyalty he commands from the men under his command, and vainly tries to defend him when Blueberry is booted out of the army on trumped up charges. What Clark does not realize however, is that he is intentionally kept out of the loop by his superiors, as it is all an elaborate scheme to send Blueberry on a classified mission. Starting out as a major, he was promoted to colonel during his tenure as the fort's commander (appears in 4 albums)

Cochise is the chief of the Navajo tribe. In 1866/67, he waged war against the American army after it imprisoned several Indian chiefs. Trusting Blueberry who urged him to sign peace, he finally accepted it. In 1870, he adopted Blueberry, wanted as an outlaw, into his tribe. He died in 1872 before his tribe had reached the safety of Mexican territory. (appears in 5 albums)

Lieutenant Crowe is a cavalry officer in the US Army at Fort Navajo. Of Native-American descent, he is hated by Major Bascom. He deserted from the army during the war against the Navajos in 1866, setting free several imprisoned Navajo chiefs previously captured by Bascom. He then helped Blueberry achieve peace with Cochise for which he was killed by Lone Eagle. (appears in 4 albums)

Jethro "Steelfinger" Diamond is an outlaw. His nickname came from the steel hand he used after his real hand was cut off by Indians. He was hired by the Central Pacific railroad to block Union Pacific's advance. He slaughtered bison with his band and blamed this crime on Union Pacific members to trigger a war with the Indians. He succeeded in making the Sioux and Cheyennes wage war against whites in 1868. After peace was achieved, he was finally killed by Sitting Bull in a duel. (appears in 3 albums)

General Dodge has always been a strong supporter and sponsor of Blueberry, ever since Blueberry had helped him escape Confederate imprisonment after the Battle of Chickamauga. Erroneously believing at first that Blueberry had betrayed him, it was Dodge who caused Blueberry's trademark facial feature, his broken nose. Later, Dodge notably helped in his rehabilitation on two occasions, the first time during the war, additionally arranging for Blueberry to become a commissioned officer, and the second time after the plot to assassinate President Grant. In between, he had entrusted his protégé with the mission of avoiding a war with Indians in 1868 at a time when he headed the Union Pacific Railroad. (appears in 6 albums)

Lieutenant Graig is the son of General Graig. Inexperienced, he was caught by Indians during the first Navajo war and then set free by Blueberry. He then helped Blueberry achieve peace by defending and supporting him. At one point Craig is captured by the Navajos and nearly tortured to death, before being saved by Blueberry. (appears in 4 albums)

"Wild Bill" Hickok is a hunter, army scout and bounty hunter. After having been ambushed by Blueberry and Navajos, Hickok teams up with the ruthless scalp hunter Gideon "Eggskull" O'Bannon to hunt down Blueberry, who had later managed to escape US Army custody, and the Navajos of Cochise. Foiled by Blueberry on virtually every turn, Hickok barely makes it out with his life, when the Navajos make their final dash into Mexico, unlike Eggskull (having already critically wounded Chini previously) who is trampled to death. (appears in 3 albums)

Lone Eagle aka Quanah, a cruel Indian determined to defeat the whites, he did his best to urge the Navajos to wage war in 1866. He succeeded in being hired as scout by the US Army, which had put him in a position to spy on, and sabotage the efforts of, the army. One of Blueberry's greatest enemies, he killed Crowe, an American officer of Indian origin and Mike's friend, and promised to also kill Blueberry. The latter finally defeated and killed him in a memorable duel, in the process avenging the death of his friend Crowe. (appears in 3 albums)

Governor Lopez gets on the competing side of Blueberry trying to find the confederate gold treasure, hidden by Trevor in Mexico. An egotistical and brutal man, Lopez would stop at nothing, including wrongful incarceration and torture, to retrieve the treasure. After Blueberry escapes, Lopez finally meets his match attempting to catch Blueberry's gang at the other end of a bridge that Blueberry already prepared with explosives. As Chihuahua state governor, Lopez was succeeded by Commandante Vigo. (appears in 3 albums)

"Prosit" Luckner is a Dutch prospector who believes in the existence of a golden mine in the Superstition Mountains. He finally found the mine but Blueberry prevented him profiting from it and sent him in jail. He achieved his aim by killing many of his partners. Actually, Luckner was the name of his former employer, he thought he had also killed. Having survived against all odds, the real Luckner, an impoverished Dutch noble man, revealed that the name of his former man servant was Gustaaf Havel. (appears in 2 albums)

Dorée Malone is a singer and dancer employed in a saloon in the town of Tombstone, Arizona. Aside from her profession, she is a formidable poker player and frequently engages Blueberry, with whom she entertains a friendly relationship, in poker marathons. It is Malone who nurses Blueberry back to health, after the latter was gunned down by a misguided youth in 1881. In return, Blueberry later saves Malone in the nick of time from being murdered by the delusional gunslinger Johnny Ringo. (appears in 5 albums)

Lieutenant Lewis "Billy" Norton is an officer in the Confederate army. Norton and Donovan used to be childhood friends in Georgia, but became alienated from each other after Harriet Tucker, whose affections Norton likewise vied for, decided to become betrothed to Donovan. By chance the paths of the former friends crossed each other during the war, and once on the scent of Donovan, Norton pursued him with a near obsessive vigor. Though Norton, believing Donovan to be a traitor, purported to do so because of Southern honor, he also intimated a personal motive – Harriet's snubbing of him in favor of Donovan – for his relentless quest for vengeance. After an intense locomotive chase, both men fell into the hands of the Union army, but Norton managed to get his pound of flesh by implicating Donovan as a double agent, which was believed by their Union captors. (appears in 2 albums)

Marmaduke "Angel Face" O'Hare is a serial killer and young handsome man hired to assassinate President Grant. Blueberry mutilated much of his face by putting it in the fire pit of a train. Angel Face then promised to do the same to him. He was finally killed by Blueberry in an intense duel. (appears in 3 albums)

Guffie Palmer is an actress and the manager of the most famous American theater troupe in the late 1860s. Jethro Steelfinger robbed her of her money in 1858 after he had promised her they would get married. Blueberry saved her from the Indians during the war in 1868. In 1869, they met again, when Guffie saved Mike near the Superstition Mountains in the desert. In 1870, Blueberry sought refuge at Santa Fe where she were living. Unbeknownst to Blueberry, Guffie is unwilling part of a band of criminals who are in league with the would-be assassins of President Grant, and was pressured to lure in Blueberry as the intended patsy for the assassination. After escaping the band, she succeeded in saving the president, who once had been her lover, but lost her life at the same time. (appears in 4 albums)

Colonel Trevor is a former Confederate cavalry officer. Charged by Confederate President Jefferson Davis at war's end to hide the war treasury for future use, Trevor did so when he hid the treasury in Mexico. He went above and beyond the call of duty, when he was imprisoned in Governor Lopez' brutal labor camp, while protecting the hoard. When he was inebriated on a previous occasion, Trevor had actually married Chihuahua Pearl, who had her own agenda, but once sobered up, that fact was not lost on Trevor. After being freed from imprisonment with the assistance of Blueberry, Trevor was murdered in a fluke occurrence while defending the treasury against the marauders of Finlay, whom he actually had condemned to death for desertion during the war. As a fellow officer, Blueberry expressed admiration and respect for Trevor's sense of duty and honor, when he discovered and buried his body, even though their interests had been opposed, and actually slapped Chihuahua Pearl when she spoke derogatorily of Trevor at the burial. Loyal to a fault, actually willing to let himself be gunned down by an irate Finlay before Blueberry intervened, Trevor's sacrifices turned out to be in vain, as the Mexicans had years earlier already absconded with the treasury. (appears in 2 albums)

Harriet Tucker is the daughter and only, somewhat doted upon, child of wealthy Georgia plantation owner Tucker. Stunningly beautiful, Harriet has had her share of suitors, which included Mike Donovan, her cousin Ronnie and Lewis Norton. Harriet decided to become betrothed to Mike, much against the wishes of her father who considered Mike a rambunctious loudmouth and much preferred Harriet to have chosen Ronnie. Harriet's carefree and somewhat naive existence as a "Southern belle" came to an abrupt end when her home was burned to the ground and her father murdered, acts she believed were perpetrated by her fiancé. However, a grief-stricken Harriet had not realized that the heinous acts were actually perpetrated by Ronnie and who had successfully framed Mike for them. In doing so, Ronnie had killed three birds with one stone; he got rid of a rival in love, destroyed evidence of his fraudulent managing of Tucker's estate, as well as standing to inherit said estate. After Ronnie was killed by Mike, Harriet spent much of the next two years and her inheritance in her quest for vengeance for the murder of her father by assembling a band of mercenaries and actively searching for her ex-lover. But when she and her band finally picked up on the trail of Mike, she had to act quickly, as he was slated to be executed by the Union army for alleged treason. In a spectacular fashion, she and her men managed to save Mike, but was herself mortally wounded during the escape. As she lay dying, it was only then that she admitted to her former lover, that she had saved him not for love, but only to be able to kill him herself. Unable to save her, Mike swore on the love they once had, that he was innocent, and with her dying breath, Harriet chose to believe him, as "(...)otherwise, dyin'd be too hard". (appears in 2 albums)

Vigo is a Mexican commandante. He was ordered by his government to find out the treasure hidden in Mexico by Trevor at the end of the Civil War, which he actually did, thereby negating all the sacrifices Trevor, who never knew that the hiding place had been compromised, had made in order to protect the cache. Then he was searched for by Blueberry because he was the only man who could prove his innocence. Committed suicide after contracting gangrene from a knife wound in the back. Vigo was initially a loyal soldier to President Benito Juárez, and was therefore unwilling to admit before a US Army board of inquiry that the Mexican government had spent the Confederate treasury to fund their uprising against Emperor Maximilian I of Mexico and his French occupation forces, which however left Blueberry a suspect of theft. By the time Blueberry found him out, Vigo, now the Chihuahua state governor – appointed as such by a grateful Juárez in recognition of his services to the country and thereby filling the position left vacant by his deceased predecessor Lopez – , had become corrupted and had scrupulously engaged in acts of self enrichment. Yet, the dying Vigo, after he had fallen out of favor with Juárez' successor Porfirio Díaz, left the proceeds of these to Blueberry as an act of contrition. It was this money that made Blueberry and his two faithful compatriots wealthy men, though he himself was embezzled out of his fortune in 1881. (appears in 4 albums)

== Non-fictional characters ==
As a realistic comics series, set against a historical background, Blueberry feature many real-life characters who left their mark on the History of United States. Among them are George Nicholas Bascom, Cochise, General Crook, General Dodge, Sitting Bull, "Wild Bill" Hickok, President Grant, the Earp brothers, Johnny Ringo and Geronimo. Aside from the actual historical characters, several fictional character were clearly patterned after historical counterparts. These included most obviously, General "Golden Mane" Allister (after General/Colonel George Armstrong Custer, sharing a similar moniker, besides his disposition and appearance), Chihuahua Pearl (after 19th century British/American stage actress Lily Langtry, sharing her beauty, predisposition for seeking out wealthy men, profession and her prenom as alias) and Vittorio (after Apache chief Victorio, sharing his countenance and a very similar name).

Less obvious was the fiercely independent Chini, a take on Apache female warrior(s) Dahteste and/or Gouyen. The scalp hunter Gideon "Eggskull" O'Bannon, so called because he had survived a scalping, which however had left the top of his skull exposed, is also grounded in fact, as two historical 19th century counterparts were known to have shared a similar fate, Josiah P. Wilbarger and Robert McGee. Even the highly unusual inclusion – considering the racist attitudes of the organization at the time – of the Native-American Crowe in the officer ranks of the regular US Army is not without historical precedent, as a respected full-blooded Native American, Ely S. Parker, had served as volunteer with distinction in the Civil War on the staff of Ulysses Grant, in the process rising to the rank of general, and gaining a formal officer's commission in the regular army after the war.

== Film-inspired characters ==
note: in order of first appearance in the original French publications.

In his youth, Blueberry artist Giraud had been a passionate fan of American Westerns, and as a result has over the years paid homage by giving several of his (mostly background) characters the appearances and/or trade marks of actors who had performed in them, usually in fleeting background cameos. Recurrent characters Giraud had given the treatment, included,

- Blueberry: In the first outings of the series, the main character was given the face of French actor Jean-Paul Belmondo. While not a Western actor this was intentional as the creators wanted to capitalize on the huge popularity Belmondo enjoyed at the time in France.
- Cochise: In the first Navajo story cycle, Cochise is given the demeanor and appearance of American actor Jeff Chandler who played the same role in the 1950 western Broken Arrow, reprising the role in the 1952 western The Battle at Apache Pass. Incidentally, no historical depiction of Cochise is known to exist.
- Jimmy McClure: Considering the very similar roles all three characters had in their respective mediums, it does not come as a surprise that Giraud modeled his character, both in appearance as well as in behaviour, after an amalgam of American actors Walter Brennan and George "Gabby" Hayes, who were renowned for their skills in playing the sidekick of the protagonist or the "grumpy old man" in the Westerns of the 1940s -1960s era, particularly those of John Ford and Howard Hawks. While Giraud had imagined his character to have white hair, in concordance with the appearances of the screen actors, it was colorist Claude Poppé who took the initiative of giving McClure red hair, which however pleased Giraud, as it made his character his distinct own. Jimmy McClure's most Brennan/Hayes inspired performance was in the one-shot title "The Man with the Silver Star" (48 pages, New York City:Dargaud International, 1983/Q2, ISBN 2205065785), itself heavily inspired by Hawk's 1959 Western Rio Bravo, in which Brennan played a prominent role as such. Incidentally, Charlier had originally written McClure as a temporary, minor background character, but Giraud was so taken with the character that he asked Charlier to expand his role in the comic series.
- Captain Finlay: In his first appearances Finlay is given the face, hairdo, rank, uniform and allegiance, of actor Richard Harris who had played the virtually identical role of Captain Benjamin Tyreen in the 1965 western Major Dundee, released shortly before Finlay made his entrance in the serialized magazine publication of the comic. Giraud saw the movie when it premiered during his non-sanctioned sabbatical in the USA and shortly before his return to France, and became from there on end a staunch fan of Sam Peckinpah, the movie's director.
- Guffie Palmer: In her first appearance, Palmer is given the face, clothing, profession and outfit of actress Shelley Winters who played an identical role in the 1968 western The Scalphunters, likewise released shortly before Palmer made her first appearance in the comic.
- Wally Blount & "Crazy" Cole Timbley: The Blount character was given the facial traits and hairdo of American actor Spencer Tracy, not based on any particular role. Giraud gave Blount's partner "Crazy" Cole Timbley the facial traits of British actor Terence Stamp.
- Chihuahua Pearl: In her first appearance as showgirl, Pearl is given exactly the same outfit, resemblance and cheek mole of actress Jayne Mansfield, playing a similar role in the 1958 western The Sheriff of Fractured Jaw.
- Dorée Malone: In his youth Giraud had been infatuated with American actress Dorothy Malone, and it was her name he had given his character, though not her appearance.

== Sources ==
- de Bree, Kees; Frederiks, Hans (1982). Stripschrift special 4: Blueberry, Arzach, Majoor Fataal, John Difool, de kleurrijke helden van Giraud/Moebius (in Dutch). Zeist: Vonk. p. 100. OCLC 63463307.
- Sadoul, Numa (January 1991). Mœbius: Entretiens avec Numa Sadoul (in French). Tournai: Casterman. p. 198. ISBN 2203380152.
- Svane, Erik; Surmann, Martin; Ledoux, Alain; Jurgeit, Martin; Berner, Horst; Förster, Gerhard (2003). Zack-Dossier 1: Blueberry und der europäische Western-Comic (in German). Berlin: Mosaik. p. 96. ISBN 393266759X.

== Web Sources ==
- https://web.archive.org/web/20080915102821/http://www.blueberry-lesite.com/
- http://www.domainegorn.com/series/blueberry.html
- http://enciclopediavisualblueberry.blogspot.nl/2010/11/characters-menu-click-on-names-to-get.html
