= Richard Allen Cultural Center =

Richard Allen Cultural Center and Museum
- RACC
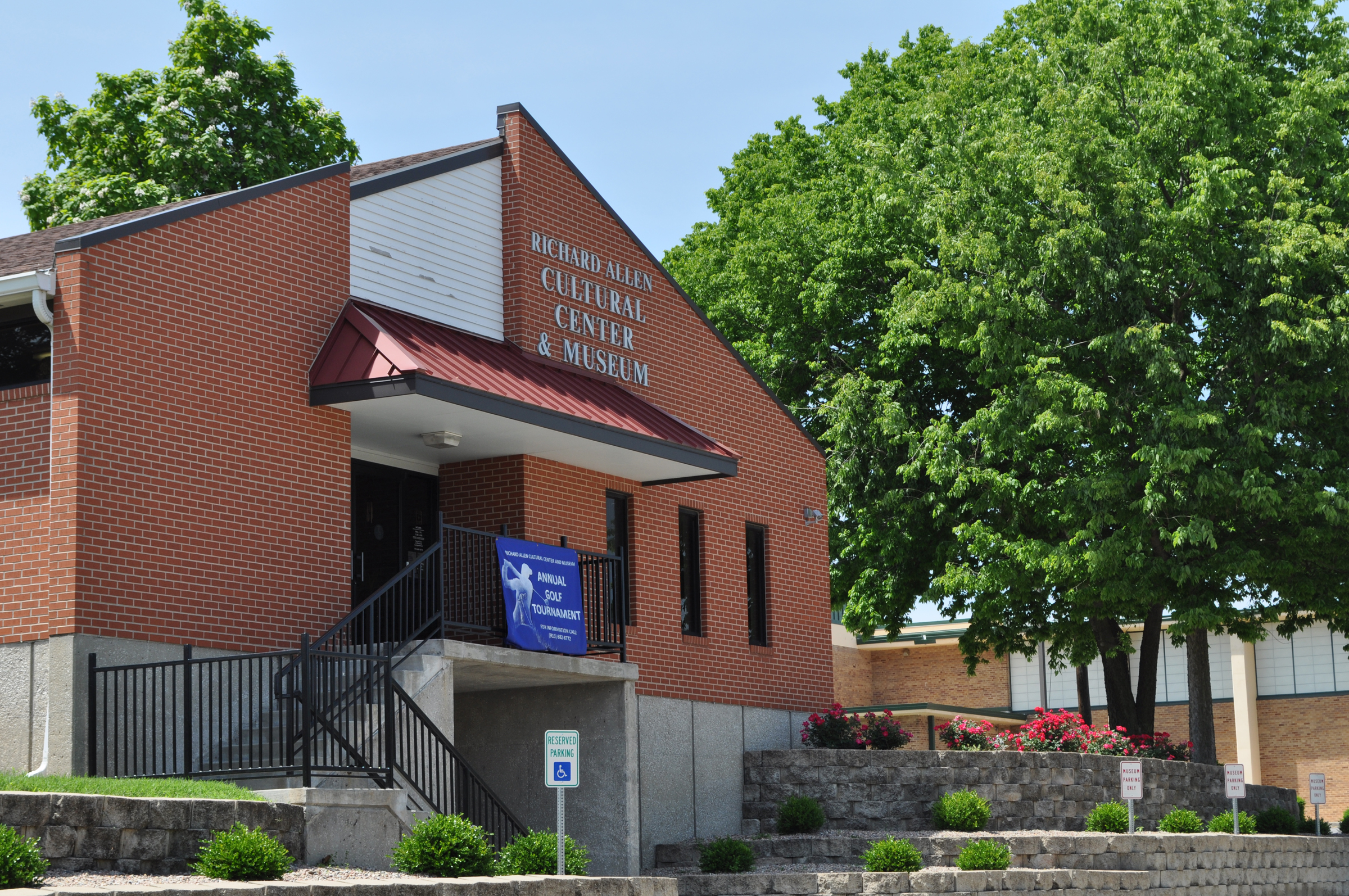
- Richard Allen Cultural Center
- Established: July 19, 1992
- Location: 412 Kiowa Street, Leavenworth, Kansas
- Coordinates: 39.3254°N 94.9158°W
- Directors: Edna Wagner (Executive); Phyllis Bass (Emeritus)
- Website: Official website

The Richard Allen Cultural Center opened in 1992 to highlight African-American history in Leavenworth, Kansas. In 1992, the museum opened in the former home of U.S. Army Captain William Bly, a Buffalo Soldier during World War I. The home is decorated to look as it would have in the early 1900s. In 2002, an addition was built to the front of the original home to display more items teaching about African-American history in Kansas. One display includes prints of original photographic plate negatives donated to the museum, called the Black Dignity Photos from the Mary Everhard collection. The photographs are African-American pioneers who lived in and around the Leavenworth area from 1870s to 1920s. Other items include military artifacts from African-American soldiers who served on Fort Leavenworth, including Colin Powell. The Richard Allen Cultural Center also contains a Ku Klux Klan costume and photographs depicting KKK activities in Leavenworth. One artifact is a news article discussing the public lynching of an African-American citizen of Leavenworth, Fred Alexander. The Richard Allen Cultural Center seeks to preserve these pieces of Leavenworth, Kansas history so that they are not forgotten.

In 2016 a bronze bust of Cathay Williams, featuring information about her and with a small rose garden around it, was unveiled outside the Richard Allen Cultural Center.

== History ==
The original Bly family Buffalo Soldier home was deeded to the Bethel African Methodist Episcopal Church in 1991. It is next to Bethel African Methodist Episcopal Church in Leavenworth. The center was named for Richard Allen, who founded the first African Methodist Episcopal church in the United States. The home of the Bly family was opened as a museum in 1992 and an addition in 2002 provided office, display space and classroom tutoring space.

== Tutoring and community outreach ==
In the basement of the new annex, the Richard Allen Cultural Center offers tutoring to children. Tutors typically include military officers from Fort Leavenworth's Buffalo Soldier Chapter of ROCKS, a professional development organization which began in the 1960s to support the professional advancement of African-American military officers in the U.S. Army. Members of THE ROCKS continue to provide tutoring to children of all races at the Richard Allen Cultural Center.
