= Chief Earth Woman =

Ojibwe woman warrior

Chief Earth Woman (born Byrtha Snyder, also recorded as Snider or Snidow; c. 1878) was an Ojibwe woman remembered in oral tradition as a warrior and spiritual figure. Accounts describe her taking part in fighting against the Sioux alongside her husband, White Owl, and receiving honours for her actions that were also accorded to male warriors. She was also credited with manito kazo, an ability to receive supernatural guidance through dreams, which she was said to have used to anticipate enemy movements and advise Ojibwe war leaders.

Her story was recorded by anthropologist Ruth Landes during her research among Ojibwe women in the 1930s. Later scholarship has discussed Chief Earth Woman within the broader tradition of Anishinaabe Ogichidaakwe, or warrior women.

== Origins and Early Life ==
Chief Earth Woman is an Ojibwe woman born around 1878 near Waterloo, Ohio, under the name of Byrtha Snyder (also recorded as Snider or Snidow). In 1893, she met her husband known as "White Owl" whom she met at a young age. Throughout her life she travelled often between Ohio and Michigan. In Ohio she resided in a place known as "Old Man's Cave" which now known as Hocking Hills State Park.

== Spiritual Authority ==
Chief Earth Woman was influential on the battle field for the Ojibwe through spiritual distinction. She claimed to possess manito kazo (the ability to communicate with supernatural powers through dreams) a gift that allowed her to lead the Ojibwe through battle. This spiritual power is not only symbolic, but allowed for her to predict the movements of the Sioux. She shared these visions with Ojibwe war leaders to guide the military efforts protecting her fellow warriors while offering direction into victory.

== Women on the Path to War ==
Unlike many Ojibwe warrior women who joined the arms out of necessity Chief Earth Woman chose the path of becoming a warrior on her own will. Her original motivation for joining was due to a romantic interest in her future husband, White Owl. However, the personal motivation soon turned into something beyond herself. Together her and White Owl killed 3 Sioux men, and secured a victory for the Ojibwe.

== Honors from the Battlefield ==
Chief Earth Woman's success on the battlefield earned her the respect of her male peers. She scalped an enemy Sioux, which was met with celebration. her fellow warriors sang in her honor, praising her for "bringing home a Sioux head". In recognition of her bravery and resilience, she was awarded feathers, the same honors given to male warriors. She became one of the very few woman to direct a war command, and receive recognition for it.

== The Legacy and Historical Recognition ==
Chief Earth Woman's story has been passed down generation to generation through oral tradition. Anthropologist Ruth Landes, conducting research in the 1930s documented the stories she heard when meeting Ojibwe woman. She wrote that Chief Earth Woman was a "conspicuous" woman who took charge on the battlefield, and actively fought and sought out enemies on the battlefield. Later writings by Colleen Sheryl McIvor situates her with the broader tradition of Anishinaabe Ogichidaakwe (warrior women). Her story is compared to other celebrated native figures such as Lozen and Running Eagle.
