= Elizabeth Newcom =

Elizabeth Caroline Newcom (sometimes misspelt as Newcome; born c. 1825) was an American woman who enlisted to fight in the Mexican–American War. She served in Company D of the Missouri Volunteer Infantry as Bill Newcom, and became the first female soldier to cross the Santa Fe Trail. She marched 600 miles from Missouri to the winter camp at Pueblo, Colorado, before she was discovered to be a woman and discharged. Newcom sued the government for land promised to her in return to her fighting, and was granted 160 acres by Congress. Newcom enlisted on September 16, 1847, to follow her lover, Amandus V. Schnabel. She participated in the conquest of New Mexico, and served for about ten months before being discharged.
