= Lozen =

Apache prophetess

Chihenne Chiricahua Apache warrior and prophet

Personal details
- Born: c. 1840
- Died: June 17, 1889 Mount Vernon Barracks, Alabama
- Relations: Victorio (brother)

Lozen (c. 1840 – June 17, 1889) was a warrior and prophet of the Chihenne Chiricahua Apache. She was the sister of Victorio, a prominent chief. Born into the Chihenne band during the 1840s, Lozen was, according to legends, able to use her powers in battle to learn the movements of the enemy. According to James Kaywaykla, Victorio introduced her to Nana, "Lozen is my right hand ... strong as a man, braver than most, and cunning in strategy. Lozen is a shield to her people".

== Victorio's Campaign ==
In the 1870s, Victorio and his band of Apaches were moved to the deplorable conditions of the San Carlos Reservation in Arizona. He and his followers left the reservation around 1877 and began marauding and raiding, all while evading capture by the military. Lozen fought beside Victorio when he and his followers rampaged against the European invaders who had appropriated their homeland around west New Mexico's Black Mountain.

As the band fled and fought American forces in Victorio's War (1879–1881), Lozen inspired women and children, frozen in fear, to cross the surging Rio Grande. "I saw a magnificent woman on a beautiful horse—Lozen, sister of Victorio. Lozen the woman warrior!", remembers James Kaywaykla, a child at the time, riding behind his grandmother. "High above her head she held her rifle. There was a glitter as her right foot lifted and struck the shoulder of her horse. He reared, then plunged into the torrent. She turned his head upstream, and he began swimming".

Immediately, the other women and the children followed her into the torrent. When they reached the far bank of the river, cold and wet but alive, Lozen came to Kaywaykla's mother, Gouyen. "You take charge, now", she said. "I must return to the warriors", who stood between their women and children and the onrushing cavalry. Lozen drove her horse back across the wild river and returned to her comrades.

According to Kaywaykla, "She could ride, shoot, and fight like a man, and I think she had more ability in planning military strategy than did Victorio." He also remembers Victorio saying, "I depend upon Lozen as I do Nana" (the aging patriarch of the band).

Late in Victorio's campaign, Lozen left the band to escort a new mother and her newborn infant across the Chihuahuan Desert from Mexico to the Mescalero Apache Reservation, away from the hardships of the trail.

Equipped with only a rifle, a cartridge belt, a knife, and a three-day supply of food, she set out with the mother and child on a perilous journey through territory occupied by Mexican and U.S. Cavalry forces. En route, afraid that a gunshot would betray their presence, she used her knife to kill a longhorn, butchering it for the meat.

She stole a Mexican cavalry horse for the new mother, escaping through a volley of gunfire. She then stole a vaquero's horse for herself, disappearing before he could give chase. She also acquired a soldier's saddle, rifle, ammunition, blanket and canteen, and even his shirt. Finally, she delivered her charges to the reservation.

There, she learned that Mexican and Tarahumara Indian forces under Mexican commander Joaquin Terrazas had killed Victorio and most of his warriors in the Battle of Tres Castillos, fought on three stony hills in northeastern Chihuahua.

== End of Apache Wars and Lozen's later years ==
Knowing the survivors would need her, Lozen immediately left the Mescalero Reservation and rode alone southwest across the desert, threading her way undetected through U.S. and Mexican military patrols. She rejoined the decimated band in the Sierra Madre (in northwestern Chihuahua), now led by the 74-year-old patriarch Nana.

Lozen fought beside Geronimo after his breakout from the San Carlos reservation in 1885, in the last campaign of the Apache Wars. With the band pursued relentlessly, she used her power to locate their enemies—the U.S. and Mexican cavalries. According to Alexander B. Adams in his book Geronimo, "she would stand with her arms outstretched, chant a prayer to Ussen, the Apaches' supreme deity, and slowly turn around." Lozen's prayer is translated in Eve Ball's book In the Days of Victorio:

Upon this earth
On which we live
Ussen has Power
This Power is mine
For locating the enemy.
I search for that Enemy
Which only Ussen the Great
Can show to me.

According to Laura Jane Moore in the book Sifters, Native American Women's Lives: In 1885 Geronimo and Naiche fled their reservation with 140 followers including Lozen after rumors began circulating that their leaders were to be imprisoned at Alcatraz Island. Lozen and Dahteste began negotiating peace treaties. One of which was that the Apache leaders would be imprisoned for two years then would have their freedom. The American's leaders dismissed the peace treaty and Lozen and Dahteste continued to negotiate. The Apache rebels believed they had strong resolve until it was revealed all the Chiricahuas had been rounded up and sent to Florida. If they wanted to rejoin their kin, the Apache needed to head east. The Apache warriors agreed to surrender and laid down their arms. Five days later they were on a train bound to Florida.

Taken into U. S. military custody after Geronimo's final surrender, Lozen traveled as a prisoner of war to Mount Vernon Barracks in Alabama. Like many other imprisoned Apache warriors, she died in confinement of tuberculosis on June 17, 1889.

== In popular culture ==
- Lozen is a major character in the novel The Hebrew Kid and the Apache Maiden, by Robert J. Avrech.

== Bibliography ==
- James Kaywaykla; Eve Ball (1970). In the Days of Victorio : Recollections of a Warm Springs Apache. Tucson: University of Arizona Press. ISBN 978-0-8165-0199-1.
- H. Henrietta Stockel (2000). Chiricahua Apache Women and Children : Safekeepers of the Heritage. College Station: Texas A & M University Press. ISBN 978-0-89096-921-2.
- Peter Aleshire (2001). Warrior Woman, the Story of Lozen, Apache Warrior and Shaman. New York: St. Martin's Press. ISBN 978-0-312-24408-8.

== Novels involving Lozen as a character ==
- Karl Lassiter (1998). The Warrior's Path. Kensington Publishing Corporation.
- Robert J. Avrech (2006). The Hebrew Kid and the Apache Maiden. Seraphic Press. ISBN 978-0-9754382-2-0.
- John Wilson (2012). Victorio's War. Orca Book Publishers. ISBN 978-1-5546-9884-4.
- Lucia St. Clair Robson (2016). Ghost Warrior. Forge Books.
- Philippe Morvan (2018). Ours. Calmann-Lévy. ISBN 978-2-7021-6353-5.

== See also ==
- Dahteste
- Gouyen
- Buffalo Calf Road Woman
- Chief Earth Woman
