= Pauline Cushman =

American actress and Civil War spy (1833–1893)

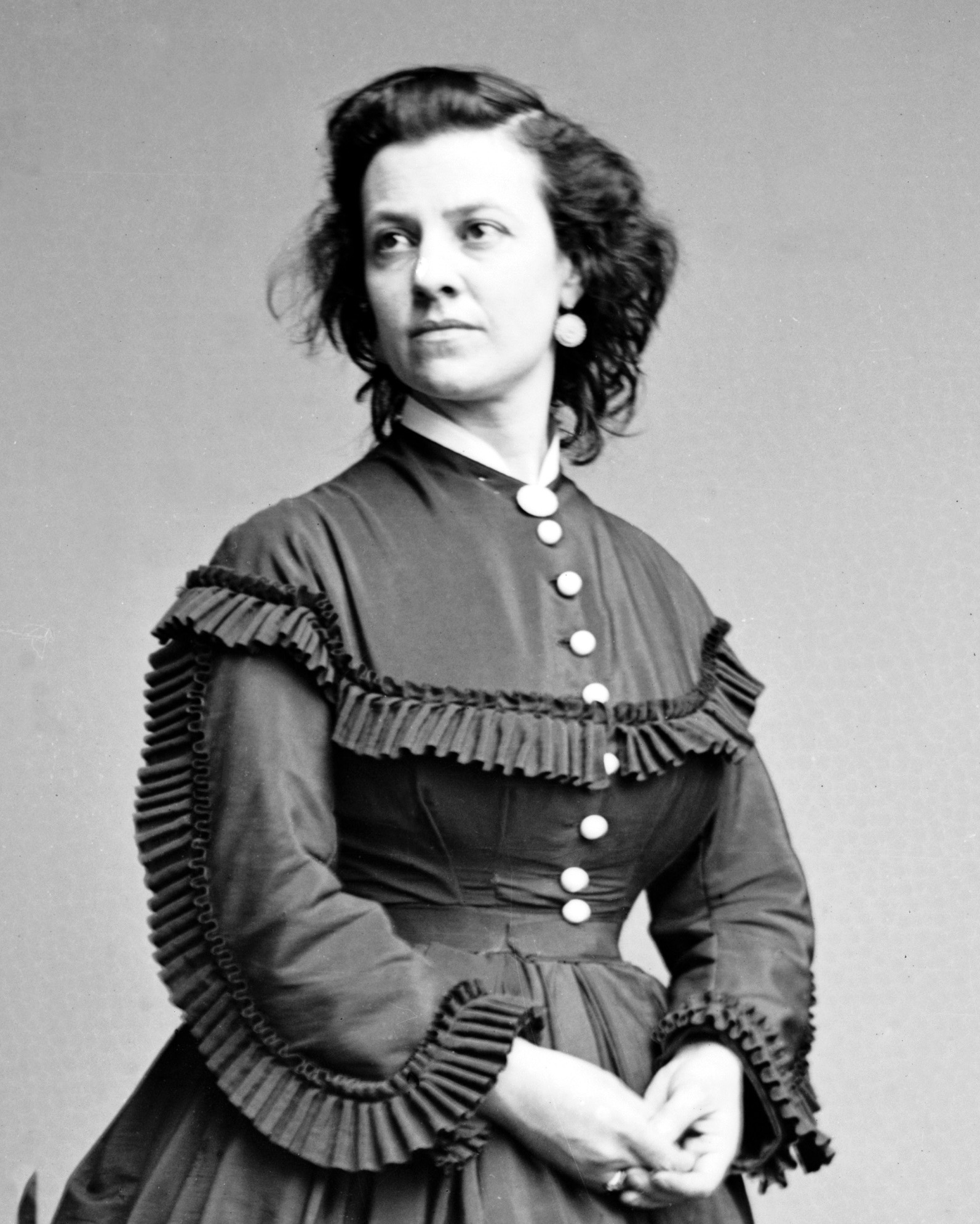
- Born: Harriet Wood; June 10, 1833; New Orleans, Louisiana, US
- Died: December 2, 1893 (aged 60); San Francisco, California, US
- Other names: Major Pauline Cushman Fryer, Pauline Fryer
- Occupations: Actress, Union Spy
- Spouse(s): Jere Fryer, August Fichtner, Charles C. Dickinson
- Children: Three, Charles and Ida, and adopted daughter Emma
- Military career
- Allegiance: United States of America
- Branch: Union Army
- Rank: Brevet Major; Honorary Major (Conferred by the president of the United States)
- Conflicts: American Civil War

Pauline Cushman (born Harriet Wood; June 10, 1833 – December 2, 1893) was an American actress and a spy for the Union Army during the American Civil War. She is considered one of the most successful Civil War spies.

== Early life ==
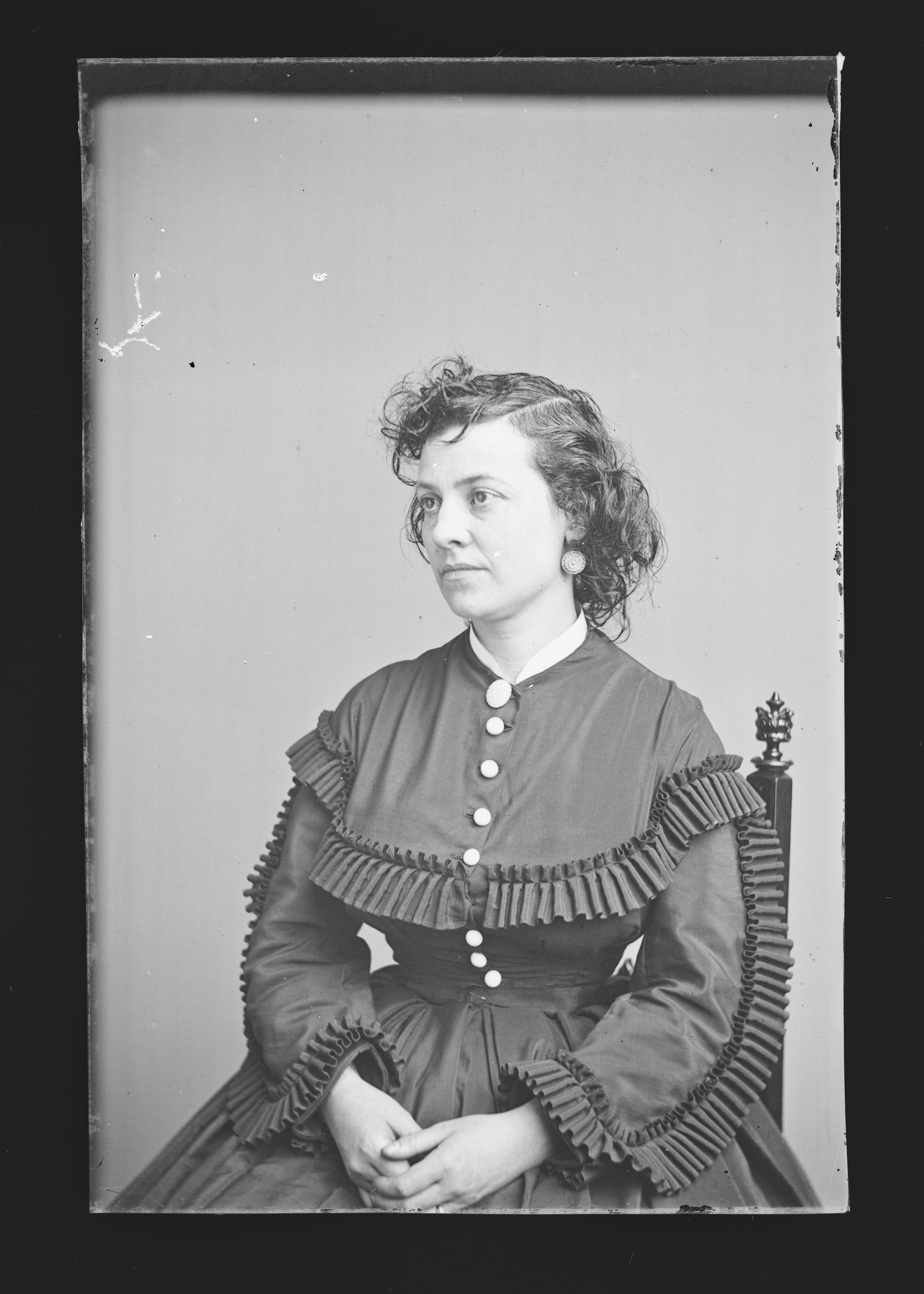
Studio photograph of Pauline Cushman, 1864

Harriet Wood, who later adopted the stage name of Pauline Cushman, was born in New Orleans, Louisiana, on June 10, 1833, the daughter of a Spanish merchant and a Frenchwoman (daughter of one of Napoleon Bonaparte's soldiers). Harriet and her brother William were raised in Grand Rapids, Michigan. Her parents moved there to establish a trading post with indigenous peoples. In 1862, she made her stage debut in Louisville, Kentucky, a Union-occupied city. Later, she would travel to New York where she would take the stage name Pauline Cushman. Over the course of her life, Cushman was married to Jere Fryer, Charles C. Dickinson, and August Fichtner. She had three children: Charles, Ida, and an adopted daughter, Emma.

== Career as a spy ==
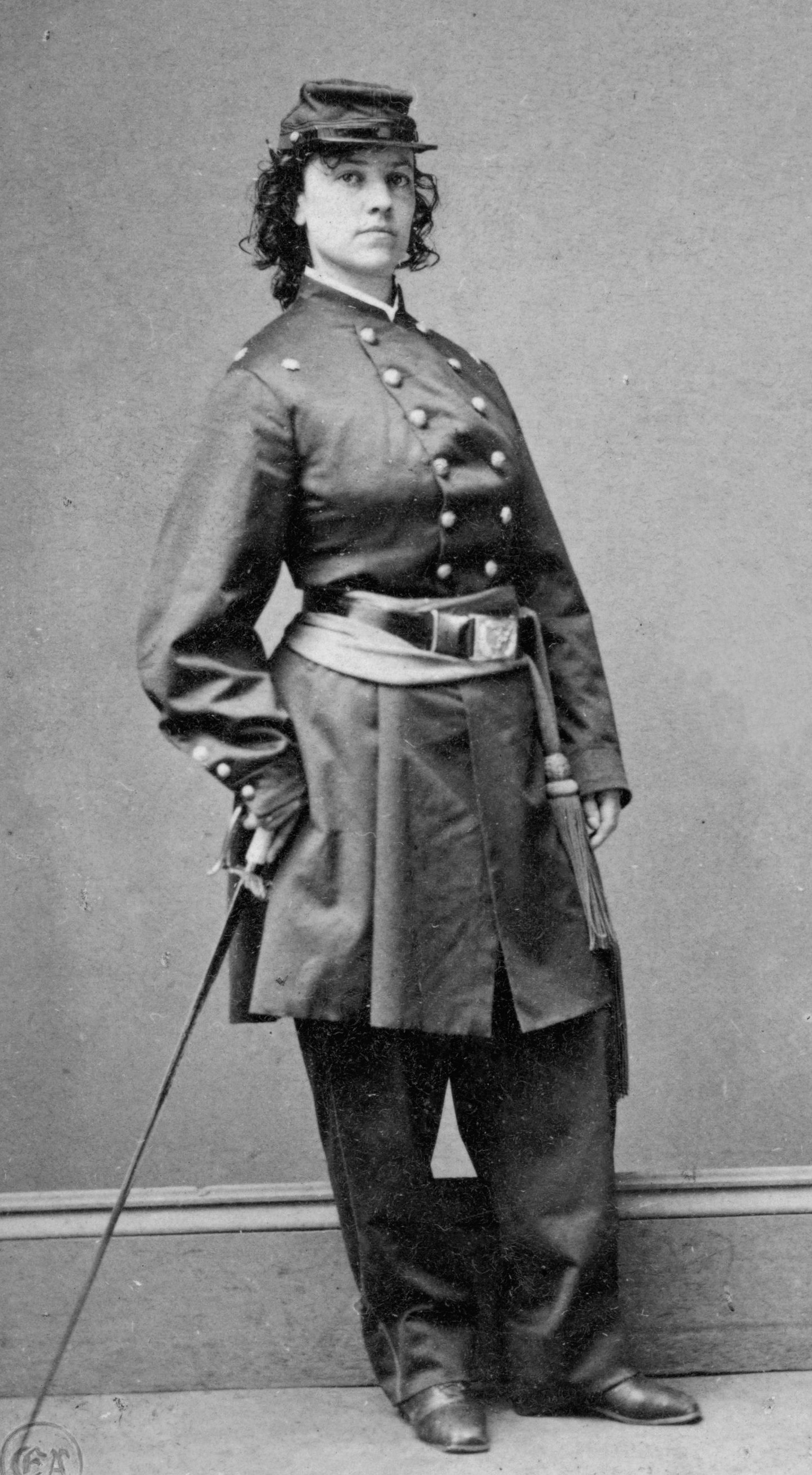
Cushman in uniform in 1865

After a Northern performance, Cushman was paid by two local pro-Confederate men to toast Confederate President Jefferson Davis after the performance. The theatre company forced her to quit, but she had other ideas. She had decided to ingratiate herself with the rebels by making the toast, while offering her services to the Union as a spy.

By fraternizing with rebel military commanders, she managed to conceal battle plans and drawings in her shoes, but was caught twice in 1863 and brought before Confederate General Braxton Bragg, tried by a military court, and sentenced to death by hanging. Though she was already ill, she acted worse off than she was. The Confederates had to postpone her execution. Cushman was spared hanging by the invasion of the area by Union troops. She was also wounded twice.

Some reports state that she returned to the South in her role as a spy, dressed in male uniform. She was awarded the rank of brevet major by General James A. Garfield, and made an honorary major by President Abraham Lincoln for her service to the Federal cause, and became known as "Miss Major Pauline Cushman." By the end of the war in 1865, she was touring the country giving lectures on her exploits as a spy.

== Later life ==
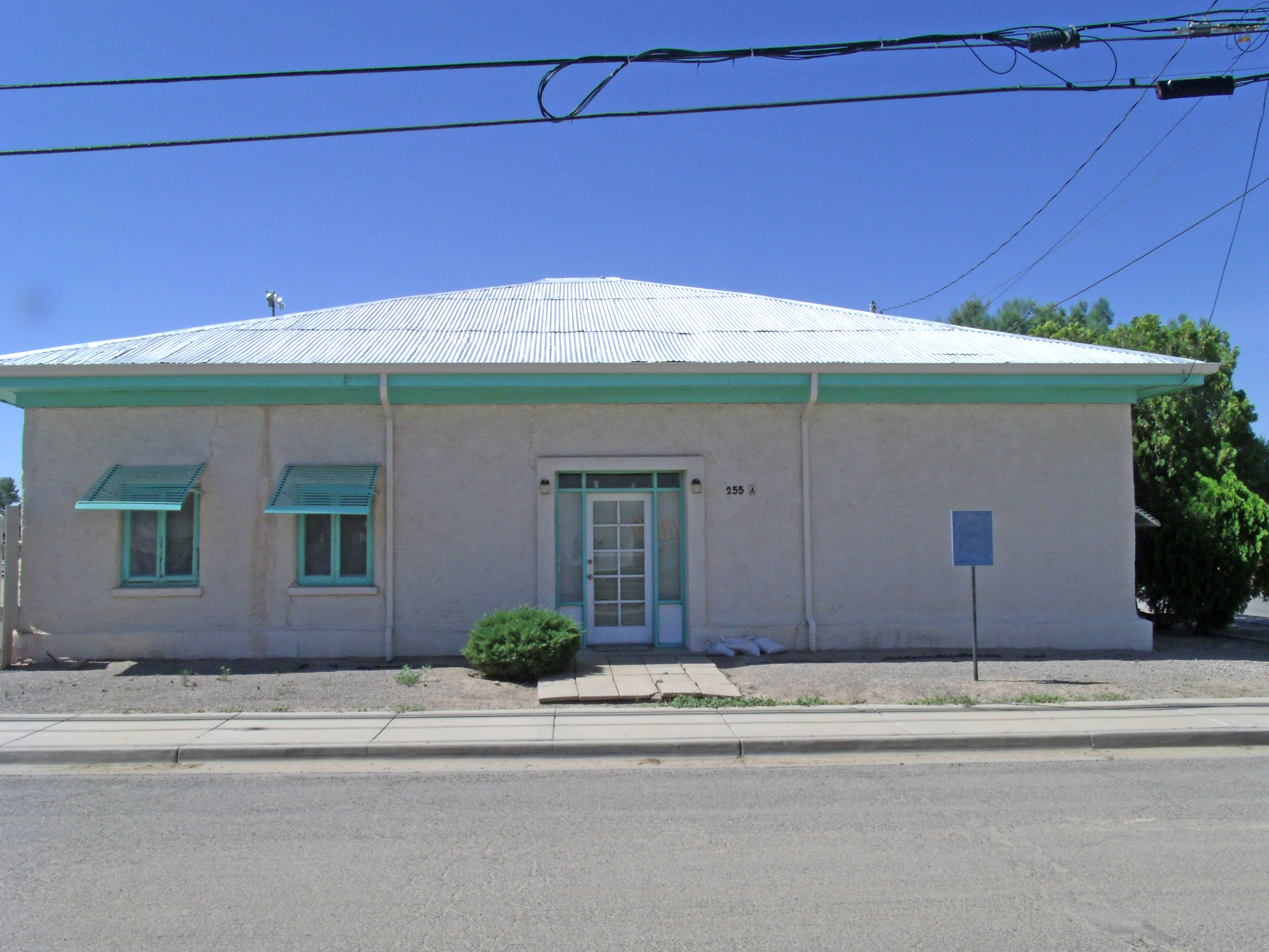
The Walker-Oury House, located at 255 Ruggles St. in Florence, Arizona Territory, is where Pauline Cushman wed Jere Fryer.

Because her undercover activities on behalf of the government were secret, there is a lack of corroborative information about her life at this time. After the war, however, she began a tour celebrating her experiences as a Union spy, working at one point with P. T. Barnum. In 1865, a friend, Ferdinand Sarmiento, wrote an exaggerated biography titled The Life of Pauline Cushman: The celebrated Union Spy and Scout, detailing her early history, her entry into the secret service, notes, and memoranda.

She lost her child to sickness by 1868, and married again in 1872 in San Francisco, but was widowed within a year. Sources state that in 1879 she met Jere Fryer, and moved to Casa Grande, Arizona Territory, where they married and operated a hotel and livery stable. Jere Fryer became the sheriff of Pinal County. Their adopted daughter, Emma, died on April 17, 1888, at 6 years old of a seizure. As a result, the Fryers separated in 1890.

By 1892, she was living in poverty in El Paso, Texas. She had applied for back pension based on her first husband's military service which she received in the amount of $12 per month beginning in June 1893. Her last few years were spent in a boarding house in San Francisco, working as a seamstress and charwoman. Disabled from the effects of rheumatism and arthritis, she developed an addiction to pain medication, and on the night of 2 December 1893 she took a suicidal overdose of morphine. She was found the next morning by her landlady.

== Death and legacy ==
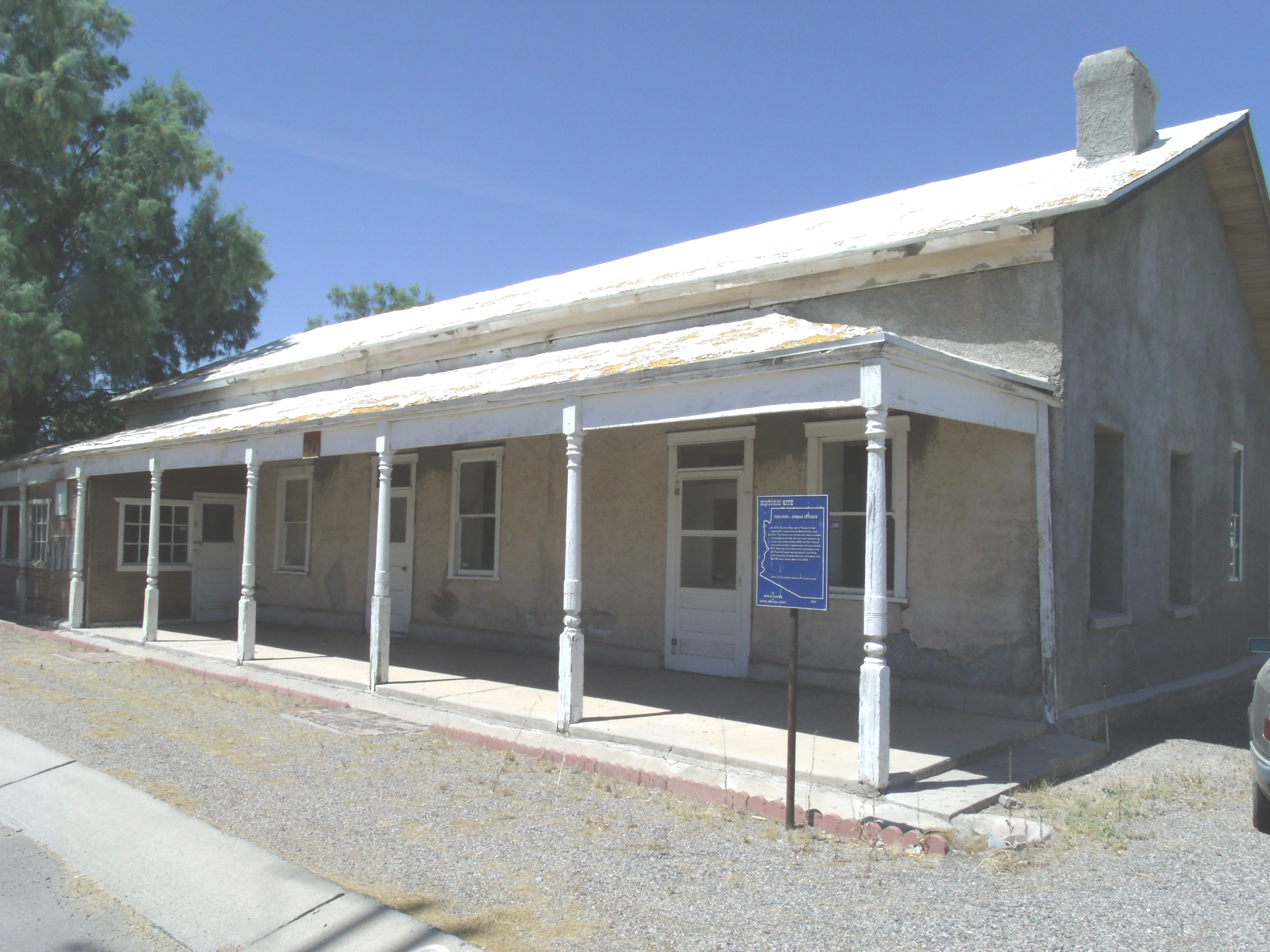
Pauline Cushman and her husband, Jere Fryer, purchased this house located at 364 North Granite Street in Florence, Arizona Territory.

She died as Pauline Fryer at the age of sixty. The time of her Civil War fame was recalled at her funeral, which was arranged by members of the Grand Army of the Republic; Cushman was buried with full military honors. "Major" Cushman's remains now rest in Officer's Circle at the Presidio's National Cemetery. Her simple gravestone recognizes her contribution to the Union's victory. It is marked, "Pauline C. Fryer, Union Spy."

In 1961, the television series Rawhide aired an episode, "The Blue Spy" with Pauline Cushman as the central character, portrayed by veteran actress Phyllis Thaxter.

A road at Fort Ritchie, Maryland a now decommissioned Army Post, was named in her honor.

== See also ==
- List of female American Civil War soldiers
