= Kuilix =

Pend d'Oreilles warrior

Kuilix in the 1846 battle against the Crow tribe, drawn by Father Nicholas Point. His caption read; "A woman warrior's swift about-face left the enemy stupefied."

Kuilix (meaning "Red Shirt" or "Red One"), also known as Kuiliy, Mary Quille, and Marie Quilax, was a woman of the Kalispel or Pend d'Oreilles in Montana. She was the leader of a team of warriors who rescued other warriors while fighting the Blackfeet in 1842.

Father Nicholas Point, a Jesuit priest who witnessed the battle, wrote:

The first Pend Oreille to dash out at the enemy was a woman named Kuilix, 'The Red One,' ... Her bravery surprised the warriors who were humiliated and indignant because it was a woman who had led the charge, and so they threw themselves into the breach where nature's shelter had protected the enemy. The Blackfeet immediately shot four shots almost at point-blank range; yet not a single Pend d'Oreille went down. Four of the enemy—some claim it was only two—managed to escape death by hiding in the thickets, but the rest were massacred on the spot.

Kuilix also took part in battle against the Crow tribe in 1846. Father Point also described this incident:

The famous Kuilix ... accompanied by a few braves and armed with an axe, gave chase to a whole squadron of Crows. When they got back to camp, she said to her companions, 'I thought that those big talkers were men, but I was wrong. Truly, they are not worth pursuing.'

Women of both the Pend d'Oreille and the related Flathead tribe traditionally took an active role in warfare, frequently entering into a battle. They also joined ritual dances dressed as warriors.

== See also ==
- Kaúxuma Núpika

== Sources ==
- Will Roscoe. Kuilix, Pend d'Oreille Warrior Woman, from Changing Ones: Third and Fourth Genders in Native North America, Palgrave/St. Martin's Press, 1998
