= Cathay Williams =

American soldier (1844–1893)

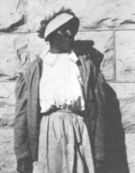
- Born: September 1844; Independence, Missouri
- Died: 1893 (aged 50–51); Trinidad, Colorado
- Other names: John Williams, William Cathay
- Occupations: Soldier, cook, seamstress
- Employer(s): U.S. government, self-employed
- Military career
- Allegiance: United States of America
- Service years: 1866–1868
- Rank: private
- Units: 38th U.S. Infantry Regiment, U.S. Army (Buffalo soldier)

Cathay Williams (September 1844 – 1893) was an American soldier. An African-American woman, she enlisted in the United States Army under the pseudonym William Cathay. Williams became the first female to enlist and the only documented woman to serve in the U.S. Army while posing as a man during the Indian Wars.

== Early life ==
Cathay Williams was born in September 1844 in Independence, Missouri, to a free man and a woman in slavery, making her legal status also that of a slave. During her adolescence, Williams worked as a house slave on the Johnson plantation on the outskirts of Jefferson City, Missouri. In 1861 Union forces occupied Jefferson City in the early stages of the Civil War. At that time, captured slaves officially were designated by the Union as contraband, and many were forced to serve in military support roles such as cooks, laundresses, or nurses. Cathay joined the Eighth Indiana Volunteer Infantry Regiment at age 17. At first, she cooked for the officers. Cooking was not one of the tasks she'd performed as a house slave, and she had to learn how to do it.

== U.S. Army service ==
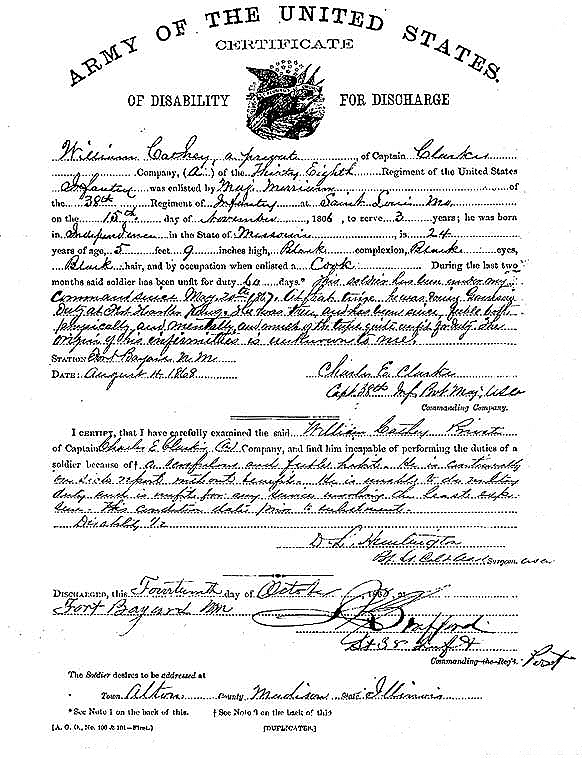
Cathay Williams' disability discharge certificate

Because of the prohibition against women serving in the military, Cathay Williams enlisted in the United States Regular Army under the false name of William Cathay on November 15, 1866, at St. Louis, Missouri, for a three-year engagement, passing herself off as a man. She was assigned to the 38th United States Infantry Regiment after she passed a cursory medical examination. Only two others are known to have been privy to the deception, her cousin and a friend, both of whom were fellow soldiers in her regiment. She is believed to be the first black woman to be awarded the Good Conduct Medal.

Shortly after her enlistment, Williams contracted smallpox, was hospitalized and later rejoined her unit, which by then was posted in New Mexico. Possibly due to the effects of smallpox, the New Mexico heat, or the cumulative effects of years of marching, her body began to show signs of strain. She frequently was hospitalized. Williams later said, “The men all wanted to get rid of me after they found out I was a woman. Some of them acted real bad to me.”

== Post-military service years ==
Cathay Williams worked as a cook at Fort Union, New Mexico, and later moved to Pueblo, Colorado. She married, but it ended disastrously when her husband stole her money and a team of horses. Williams had him arrested.

She moved to Trinidad, Colorado, where she worked as a seamstress. She may also have owned a boarding house. It was at this time that Williams' story first became public. A reporter from St. Louis heard rumors of an African-American woman who had served in the army, and he came to interview her. Her life and military service narrative was published in The St. Louis Daily Times on January 2, 1876.

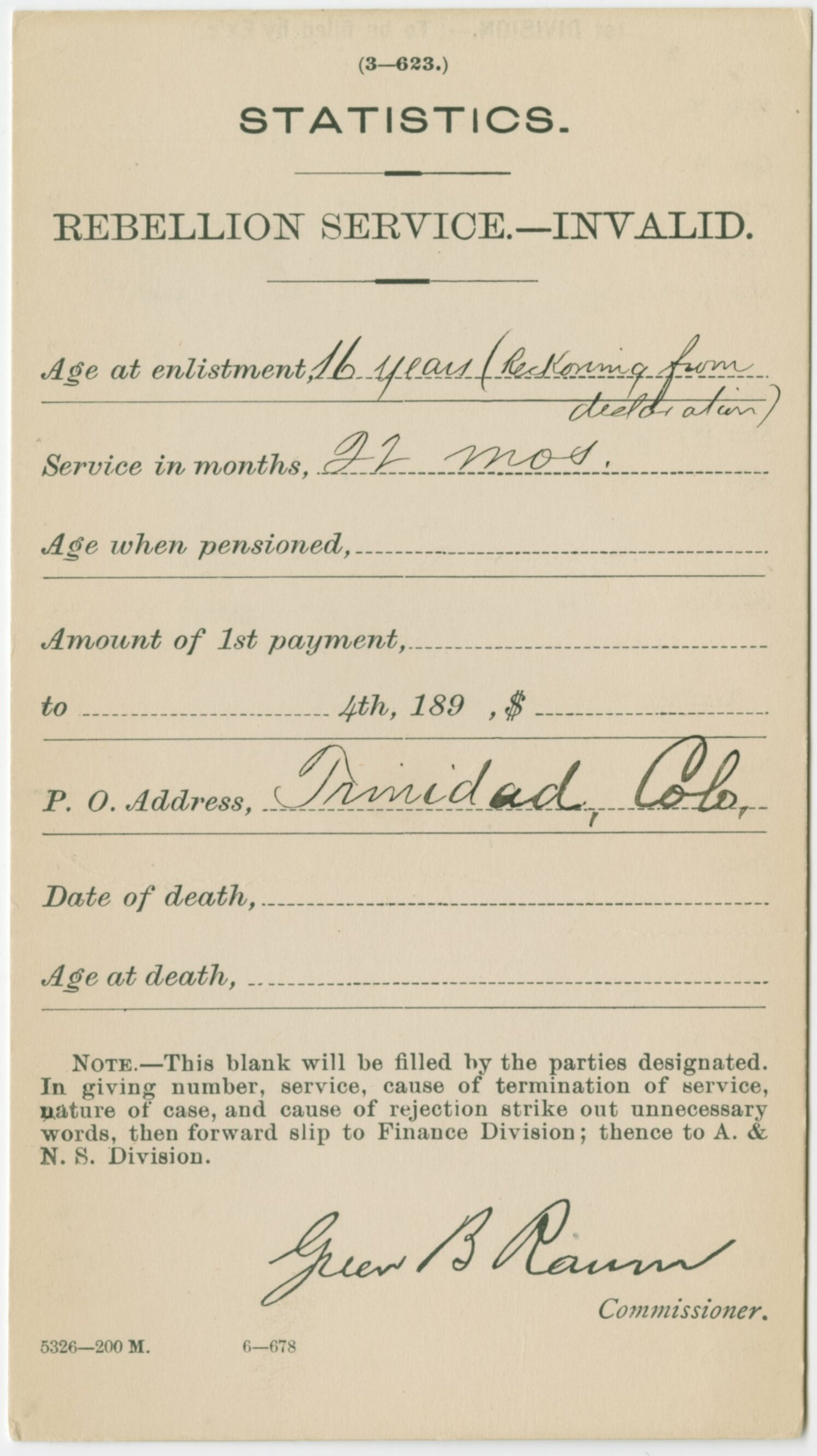
U.S. Army Pension records for Cathay Williams

In late 1889 or early 1890, Williams entered a local hospital where she remained for some time, and in June 1891, applied for a disability pension based on her military service. The nature of her illness and disability are unknown. There was precedent for granting a pension to female soldiers. Deborah Sampson in 1816, Anna Maria Lane, and Mary Hayes McCauley (better known as Molly Pitcher) had been granted pensions for their service in the American Revolutionary War.

== Declining health and death ==
In September 1892, a doctor employed by the U.S. Pension Bureau examined Cathay Williams. Despite the fact that she suffered from neuralgia and diabetes, resulting in the amputation of her toes, and could only walk with a crutch, the doctor decided she did not qualify for disability payments.

The exact date of Williams' death is unknown, but it is assumed she died shortly after being denied a pension, probably sometime in 1893. Her grave marker is likely to have been made of wood and deteriorated long ago. Thus her final resting place is unknown.

== Honors ==
In 2016, a bronze bust of Cathay Williams, featuring information about her and with a small rose garden around it, was unveiled outside the Richard Allen Cultural Center in Leavenworth, Kansas.

In 2018, the Private Cathay Williams monument bench was unveiled on the Walk of Honor at the National Infantry Museum.

== See also ==
- African-American firsts
- List of wartime crossdressers
- The Harder They Fall, a 2021 revisionist Western film in which Danielle Deadwyler portrays Cuffee, a transgender man modeled after Williams.
