= Old-Lady-Grieves-the-Enemy =

Pawnee warrior

Old-Lady-Grieves-the-Enemy was a Pawnee woman who gained her name in the 19th century for her famed defense of the village of Pahaku against raiders.

== Biography ==
Grieves-the-Enemy was best known among the Pawnee for her defense of the village of Pahaku, which was attacked by the Ponca and Sioux in such outnumbering force that the village men resigned themselves and hid. In spite of this, Grieves-the-Enemy, then over the age of fifty, openly attacked the raiding men with a club and killed one of the Ponca tribesmen. Her actions rallied the village men to action, and the attack was repelled.
