= Lizzie Compton =

Woman soldier in the Union army

Elizabeth Compton (born c. 1848) was a woman soldier fighting for the Union in the American Civil War. She enlisted at the age of 14, and served in seven different regiments until the conclusion of the war, thus holding the record for reenlisting in the most regiments. Compton fought at Mill Springs, Fort Donelson, Shiloh, and Gettysburg until the conclusion of the Civil War before moving to Ontario, Canada.

== Early life ==
Little is definitively known of Lizzie Compton's early life, as she gave different details of her life each time she was discovered. When wounded and discovered on the battlefield at Green River Bridge, she claimed that she traveled from her hometown of London, Ontario to enlist in the Union. On another occasion, she had also claimed that her hometown was in Pennsylvania.

The most complete account of her early life starts in a rural area near Nashville, Tennessee in 1848, where she was born. After the death of her parents in her infancy, Compton was left in the care of people whom she described as "unfeeling wretches." In another case, she said that her guardians were secessionists, and were the reason of her escape. At an early age, she worked in the fields. During that time, she had not received an education, had never been in full women's clothing, and was never taught the duties associated with running the household, unusual for a girl in the mid 19th century. To escape her life, she left at the age of thirteen, dressed as a boy, when she got a job on a steamboat that established her identity as male.

== Civil War ==
Lizzie Compton was thirteen years old when the Civil War began. At the age of fourteen, she enlisted in the army, falsifying her age and changing her name. Two of her known male aliases were "Jack" and "Johnny".

Compton saw considerable action during the war, serving in seven different regiments, holding the record for the most reenlistments. She transferred many times, either due to her sex being revealed or her fear of being detected. Her first reveal was when she was dared by her comrades to ride an unruly horse. While being treated for injuries sustained during the dare, the doctor revealed her as a woman, and she was thus discharged.

In the 18 months Compton was in the army, she served in the 11th Kentucky Cavalry, 125th Michigan Cavalry, 21st Minnesota Infantry, the 8th, 17th, and 28th Michigan Infantry and the 3rd New York Cavalry. Her first battle was the Battle of Mill Springs on January 19, 1862, where she watched the fall of General Felix Zollicoffer. Compton fought and was wounded by shrapnel at the Battle of Antietam during the Union's uphill charge. After being wounded at Fredericksburg and being transferred out, she immediately headed west to rejoin the army as part of the 25th Michigan Infantry. While fighting at the Battle of Gettysburg, she was wounded and discharged again. She was subsequently shot in the shoulder in a squabble outside of Green River, Kentucky, at the Battle of Tebbs Bend. While she was being treated by the surgeon, her sex was discovered. Undeterred, she returned to Green River after her recovery to join a regiment that was encamped there. She also fought in the Battle of Fort Donelson, the Battle of Shiloh, and the Battle of Antietam.

Compton was also occasionally drawn out of her regiment to remove or tend to the wounded on the field, a job that she was commended for.

== Later life ==
On February 20, 1864, Compton was arrested under charges of disorderliness in Rochester, New York for trying to enlist in another regiment. When told that it was against the law to dress as a man, she replied that she would never be a lady. She said that she could be a gentleman, but she would rather die than be a lady. When taken to the Chief Magistrate, she told him of her story and was let go. Her bail was entered on account of her good behavior and cooperation, after which she boarded a train and left town. She went off to join the 11th Kentucky Cavalry, her last service, and was almost immediately detected. Her last known whereabouts were Ontario, Canada, where she made her home.

== Physical Appearance ==
Lizzie Compton stood a little over 5 feet tall and was slight of build. She was of stout build, had light brown hair, and a fair complexion. One contemporary said that she appeared a "rosy boy of fifteen", and another vowed that she wasn't above seventeen. As with many women soldiers, she relished the freedom that menswear gave her, both physically and socially.

== See also ==
- List of female American Civil War soldiers
