= Woman Chief =

Crow Indian Chief (c.1806–1854)

- Bíawacheeitchish
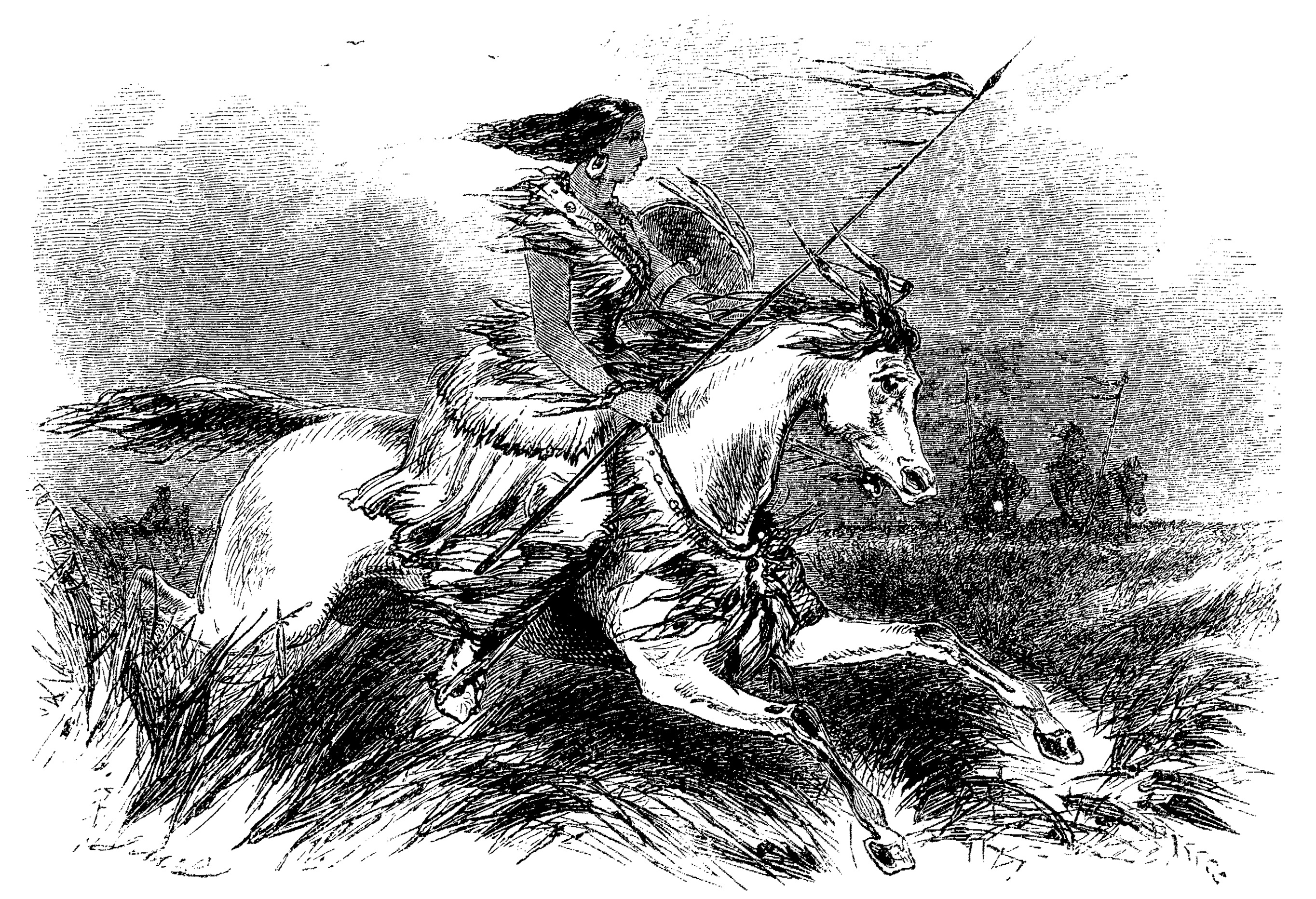
- Idealized illustration of "Pine Leaf", possibly identified with Woman Chief, from James Beckwourth's autobiography

Crow chief and warrior

Personal details
- Born: c.1806
- Died: 1854 Fort Union
- Cause of death: Killed by the Gros Ventres

Bíawacheeitchish, in English Woman Chief (c. 1806 – 1854), was a bacheeítche (chief) and warrior of the Crow people. Interested in traditionally male pursuits from an early age, she became one of the Crows' most significant leaders, joining the Council of Chiefs as the third ranking member. She attracted substantial attention from Western visitors; she may be the same person as "Pine Leaf" described by James Beckwourth, though the accuracy of this account is challenged.

== Biography ==
The woman eventually known as Woman Chief was born to the Gros Ventre people; her birth name is unknown. At the age of about 10 she was taken prisoner by a raiding party of Crows, and was adopted by a Crow warrior who raised her among his people. She showed a disposition to assume traditionally male activities, and her foster father evidently encouraged her pursuits, as he had lost his sons to death or capture. She earned acclaim for her horse riding, marksmanship, and ability to field-dress a buffalo. However, unlike other Two-Spirits, she wore typical female clothing rather than adopting men's garments. When her father died, she assumed leadership of his lodge.

She gained renown as a warrior during a raid by the Blackfoot on a fort sheltering Crow and white families. She reportedly fought off multiple attackers and was instrumental in turning back the raid. She subsequently raised her own band of warriors and raided Blackfoot settlements, taking off many horses and scalps. For her deeds she was accepted to represent her lodge as bacheeítche (chief) in the Council of Chiefs and was given the name Bíawacheeitchish, or Woman Chief. She eventually rose to the rank of third among the council's 160 lodges. She married four wives, which increased the wealth and prestige of her lodge. She became involved in peace negotiations with other Upper Missouri tribes following the 1851 Treaty of Fort Laramie, and successfully negotiated peace with the Gros Ventres, the tribe of her birth. After several years of peace, Woman Chief was ambushed and killed by a Gros Ventres party in 1854.

Western visitors who met Woman Chief, including Edwin Denig and Rudolph Kurz, were fascinated with her. Typically, they considered her an exotic figure among the patriarchal Crow and likened her to the Amazons of European myth. Their accounts are now considered biased, though they provide valuable details about Woman Chief's life. James Beckwourth wrote about a Crow warrior named Bar-chee-am-pe, or Pine Leaf, who may be identified with Woman Chief. Some details of Pine Leaf's life match what is known of Woman Chief, though Beckwourth's account appears to be greatly exaggerated, if not entirely fictional. Beckwourth claimed to have met Pine Leaf while living with the Crow in the 1820s. He wrote that she was a formidable warrior who vowed to kill one hundred enemies before she would marry. He further claimed to have had a romantic relationship with her and to have proposed marriage. Among those challenging Beckwourth's account was Bernard DeVoto, who wrote that Beckwourth is reliable save for three areas: numbers, romance, and his own importance.

Beside Woman Chief there were other known warrior women of the Crow Nation, including Akkeekaahuush (Comes Toward The Near Bank, c. 1810 – 1880) and Biliíche Héeleelash (Among The Willows, c. 1837 – 1912), the latter a prominent war leader (pipe carrier).
