= Gouyen =

Apache warrior

- Góyą́ń ("the one who is wise")
- A portrait of Gouyen

Warm Springs Apache leader

Personal details
- Born: c. 1857
- Died: 1903 Fort Sill, Oklahoma
- Spouse(s): Married twice; second husband: Kaytennae
- Children: Son: Kaywaykla

Gouyen (in Mescalero Góyą́ń, "the one who is wise") (c. 1857 – 1903), was a 19th-century Apache woman noted for her heroism.

== Early life and education ==
Góyą́ń (Gouyen) was born circa 1857 into Chief Victorio's Warm Springs Apache or Chihenne band of Chiricahua Apache, niece to old chief Kastzidzen, called Nana. She married as a young woman.

== Vendetta against the Comanche ==
Gouyen's first husband was killed in a Comanche raid in the 1870s. She took heroic actions to avenge his death, which have become legendary in Apache oral history. She tracked to his camp the Comanche chief who scalped her husband. There she found the chief watching a victory dance around a bonfire, and he was wearing her husband's scalp from his belt.

Gouyen donned a buckskin puberty ceremony dress and slipped into the circle of dancers. She seduced the drunken chief to go with her to a secluded spot. After a struggle, she stabbed the Comanche to death with his own knife, scalped him, and took his beaded breechcloth and moccasins. Stealing a horse, Gouyen rode back to her camp. She presented her in-laws with the Comanche leader's scalp and clothing as evidence of her triumphant revenge.

== Battle of Tres Castillos ==
Gouyen was a member of Victorio's band—accustomed to fight flank Apache men, and her man, Kaytennae—and she was with the great Tchihende chief even during their final days evading or fighting U.S. and Mexican troops along the U.S.–Mexican border. While the warriors were standing to fight the U.S. Cavalry on the American side of Rio Grande, Lozen (the woman warrior, younger sister to chief Victorio) led the women and the children to the Mexican side of the river, then left Gouyen, who was already a skilled fighter and Lozen's younger aid, in charge of them to go back to the battle, giving her order to lead non-combattants to a safe place. On October 14, 1880, the group was resting at Tres Castillos, Mexico—while old Nana was on the path to get ammunitions and Lozen was escorting a young mother and her children to the Mescalero reservation—when they were surrounded and attacked by Mexican soldiers. Out of ammunitions, Victorio and 77 other Apache were killed, and several taken prisoner. Only 17 Apache escaped, including Gouyen and her young son Kaywaykla. Her infant daughter was said to have been killed in the attack.

== Later life ==
Gouyen married a second time, to an Apache warrior named Kaytennae. He also escaped during the Battle of Tres Castillos, reuniting his small group of survivors with coming back Nana's party en Lozen. Afterward, Kaytennae was a member of Nana and Geronimo's band during the early 1880s. He and Gouyen escaped with Geronimo from the San Carlos Reservation in 1883.

During their maneuvers to evade capture, Gouyen saved Kaytennae's life by killing a man who was trying to ambush him. In 1886, Gouyen and her family were taken prisoner by the U.S. Army, along with others in Geronimo's band. They were held as prisoners of war at Fort Sill, Oklahoma, where she died in 1903.
