= Running Eagle =

Blackfoot chief

Pi'tamaka, Pita Omarkan (Running Eagle)
- Otaki

Piegan Blackfoot leader

Personal details
- Born: Southern Alberta, Canada
- Died: After 1878
- Cause of death: Killed by Flathead tribe while stealing horses for a battle
- Known for: Rescued her father after an enemy tribe shot his horse
- Nickname: Brown Weasel Woman

Running Eagle (Pi'tamaka) was a Native American woman and war chief of the Blackfeet Tribe known for her success in battle.

== Early life ==
Running Eagle was oldest among her siblings and was residing in Southern Alberta, Canada. She was also known as "Brown Weasel Woman." She was born into the Piikáni Piegan Tribe of the Blackfeet Nation. Running Eagle had three younger sisters and two brothers. As a child, she preferred to play with boys rather than girls, and at age 12, she began to wear boys' clothing.

Her father taught her the same things he taught her brothers, even though it was against her mother's wishes. Running Eagle's father was an important warrior and taught her how to hunt and fight. It was not long before she began to go on hunting expeditions to shoot buffalo.

During a hunting expedition, the group was attacked by the Assiniboine, an enemy tribe. As the hunting party fled, her father's horse was shot. When Running Eagle saw this, she raced straight into enemy fire. She dropped the fresh meat she was carrying and pulled her father onto her horse, saving his life. After this victory, she was celebrated and allowed to sing the Victory Song, and a Scalp Dance was done in her honor. Although many celebrated her victory, there were those who shunned her behavior. Some of the tribe worried that the other women would follow her lead and leave their duties as wives.

Running Eagle's mother's health started to fail; after that her father died in a battle against the Crow. When her mother heard of this, she succumbed to her illness, leaving Running Eagle, the eldest child, in charge of the family. She did not like life as a caretaker, so after a while, she took a widow into her home to care for her siblings and do the housework.

== Successes in battle ==
One day, a group of her tribe's warriors headed out to raid a Crow camp and take back their horses. Carrying her father's rifle, Running Eagle tagged along behind. It is said that the party leader spotted her, and tried to make her go back home, yet she refused. He then threatened to call off the raid if she did not comply, and she replied that she would continue on to the Crow camp alone. With that, her stubbornness won. During the raid, she successfully captured 11 horses for the tribe. She then kept watch while the men rested on their way back to camp, and upon spotting two enemy Crow men attempting to reclaim the stolen goods, she took them down herself. Once again, she was celebrated for these heroic acts, yet some still looked at her with disdain.

Because of this disapproval, her elders suggested that she go on a vision quest, which included going to a remote area for four days and fasting, while one waits for the spirits to show them their destiny in a vision. Vision quests were an important rite of passage for male warriors, but were not typically attempted by women, making it a fitting challenge to prove her worth as a warrior. Running Eagle agreed, and when she returned, she said she had had a vision of the sun. It included the sun promising to give her great power in battle, as long as she never slept with a man.

After she shared this vision, she was then invited to a second war party and invited to participate in the Medicine Lodge Ceremony to share her tales. Usually, only men were allowed to participate in this ceremony. The tribe's Chief, Lone Walker, bestowed the name "Running Eagle" on her because of her greatness. This was a name only given to the greatest warriors, and it was the first time it had ever been given to a woman. She was also asked to be a part of the Braves Society of Young Warriors.

After she gained the full respect of her tribe, she continued to lead many successful war parties and hunting expeditions. She never married, and although she led war parties and wore men's clothes, it is said that she also cooked for the men and repaired their moccasins—which were tasks typically done by the women of the tribe, and as such the men had likely never been taught how to do so for themselves.

== Death and legacy ==
She died sometime after 1878 in a battle against the Flathead warriors. The Flathead warrior that killed her went by the name Zamalya. The Flathead warriors had heard that a woman was leading the war party, so they targeted her immediately, and clubbed her from behind. It is rumored among the Blackfeet that she died in battle because the Sun stopped protecting her after she broke her vow and slept with a man in the war party.

Today, the Pitamakan Lake in Glacier National Park, Montana is named after her. Montana is the site where many of her Blackfeet descendants still reside on a reservation in modern-day America.

== Other uses of name ==
There is a long-running joke about U.S. politicians being given the honorary name "Running Eagle" or "Walking Eagle" as part of a tribal ceremony, only to later learn that it means "a bird so full of shit that it can't fly".

== Sources ==
- Hungry Wolf, Beverly The Ways of My Grandmothers
- Bright, William. Native American Placenames of the United States. Norman: U of Oklahoma, 2004. Print.
- Lisa, Laurie. Native American Women: A Biographical Dictionary. Ed. Gretchen M. Bataille. New York: Garland, 1993. Print.
- McManus, Sheila. "Pitamakan." Encyclopedia of Lesbian, Gay, Bisexual and Transgender History in America. Ed. Marc Stein. Detroit: Charles Scribner's Sons, 2004. Biography in Context. Web. 10 Dec. 2015.
- Waldman, Carl. Biographical Dictionary of American Indian History to 1900. New York: Facts on File, 2001. Print.
