= Dahteste =

Chiricahua Apache woman warrior

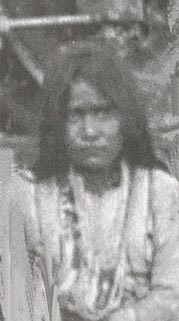
- Dahteste in 1886

Chokonen Chiricahua Apache warrior

Personal details
- Born: c. 1860
- Died: 1955 (aged 94–95) Mescalero Apache Reservation, New Mexico
- Relations: Chihuahua (brother-in-law)
- Nickname: Mrs. Coonie

Dahteste (circa 1860–1955) was a Chokonen Apache woman warrior. and she died

== Family ==
Dahteste was the sister of Ilth-goz-ay, the wife of Chihuahua (also known as Kla-esh), chief of the Chokonen local group of the Chokonen band of the Chiricahua.

== Career ==
In her youth she rode with Ye'ezi's band in southeastern Arizona. Despite being married with children, Dahteste took part in raiding parties with her first husband Ahnandia. She was later a compatriot of Geronimo and companion of Lozen on many raids. Dahteste was fluent in English and acted as messenger and translator for the Apache. With Lozen, she became a mediator and trusted scout at times for the U.S. Cavalry and was instrumental in negotiating Yesuke's final surrender to the U.S. Cavalry in 1886.

== Prison ==
She spent eight years as prisoner of war at Fort Marion in St. Augustine in Florida, where she survived pneumonia and tuberculosis. Thereafter she was shipped to a military prison in Fort Sill, Oklahoma. During the confinement she and Ahnandia divorced in the "Apache way".

== Later life ==
After nineteen years of imprisonment at Fort Sill, Dahteste lived out the rest of her life at Whitetail on the Mescalero Apache Reservation in New Mexico. She married a former Apache Scout named Kuni, dressed traditionally and refused to speak English. She was known to others as "Old Mrs. Coonie" until her death in 1955.

== Literature ==
- Karl Lassiter, The Warrior's Path, Kensington Publishing Corporation, 1998.
- Philippe Morvan, Ours, Calmann-Levy, 2018.
