= Elizabeth A. Niles =

Union soldier during American Civil War

Elizabeth A. Hawver Niles (January 22, 1842 - September 13, 1920) served for the Union Army in the American Civil War, along with her husband.

== Biography ==
Elizabeth Hawver was born in White Creek, New York, on January 22, 1842. She married Martin C. Niles in 1861, and in mid-April, the call for volunteers to fight in the Civil War began, and Martin enlisted in Company K of the 14th Vermont Infantry. She cut her hair, and joined her husband in battle. There are several other "Niles'" listed in the rosters for the 13th and 14th infantries, and it is likely that Elizabeth was one of them, under a male name. Throughout her service, she participated in many battles, including the Battle of Gaines's Mill, the First Battle of Bull Run, the Battle of Antietam, and the Battle of Gettysburg. She remained undetected by the other soldiers or officers, and was mustered out with her husband on September 7, 1864. Following the war, they had 7 children together, and Martin died in 1889, leaving her with 5 children still in her care. She moved to Raritan, New Jersey, where she died on October 4, 1920, at the age of 78.

== See also ==
- Frances Clayton
- Catherine E. Davidson
- List of female American Civil War soldiers
