= List of female American Civil War soldiers =

Numerous women enlisted and fought in the American Civil War.

Historian Elizabeth D. Leonard writes that, according to various estimates, between five hundred and one thousand women enlisted as soldiers on both sides of the war.

== A-B ==
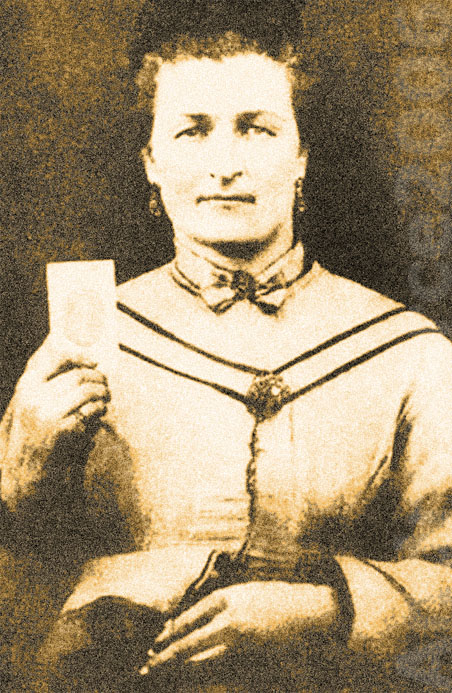
Malinda Blalock

- Mollie Bean served with the Confederate Army under the name Melvin Bean. She was captured by the Union Army in February 1865 near Richmond, Virginia.
- Mary and Molly Bell, cousins who both served with the Confederate Army.
- Malinda Blalock (1842 – 1901 or 1903) was a female soldier who fought on both sides during the Civil War. She followed her husband and joined the 26th North Carolina Regiment of the Confederate Army, disguising herself as a young man and calling herself Samuel Blalock. The couple eventually escaped across Confederate lines and joined the Union partisans in the Appalachian mountains of western North Carolina.
- Disguised as a man, Florena Budwin (1844–1865) enlisted in the Union Army in Philadelphia with her husband, an artillery captain. Captured by the Confederacy in 1864, she was confined at the notoriously brutal Andersonville Prison, and the transferred to Florence Stockade. Her status was discovered while under treatment for pneumonia, and she died, age 20.
- Mary Burns (1821–1863), or John Burns, was an American woman who disguised herself as a man in order to fight in the war. She enlisted in the 7th Michigan Volunteer Cavalry Regiment in order not to be parted from her lover, who was in the same regiment.

== C-D ==
- Albert Cashier (1843–1915) was Irish-born (though records differ on this point with his 1907 pension application listing him born in New York) and served three years in the Union Army as a male soldier. Cashier lived the next fifty years as a man. Cashier's regiment was part of the Army of the Tennessee under Ulysses S. Grant and fought in approximately forty battles, including the Siege of Vicksburg. During this campaign, Cashier was captured while performing reconnaissance, but managed to escape and return to the regiment.
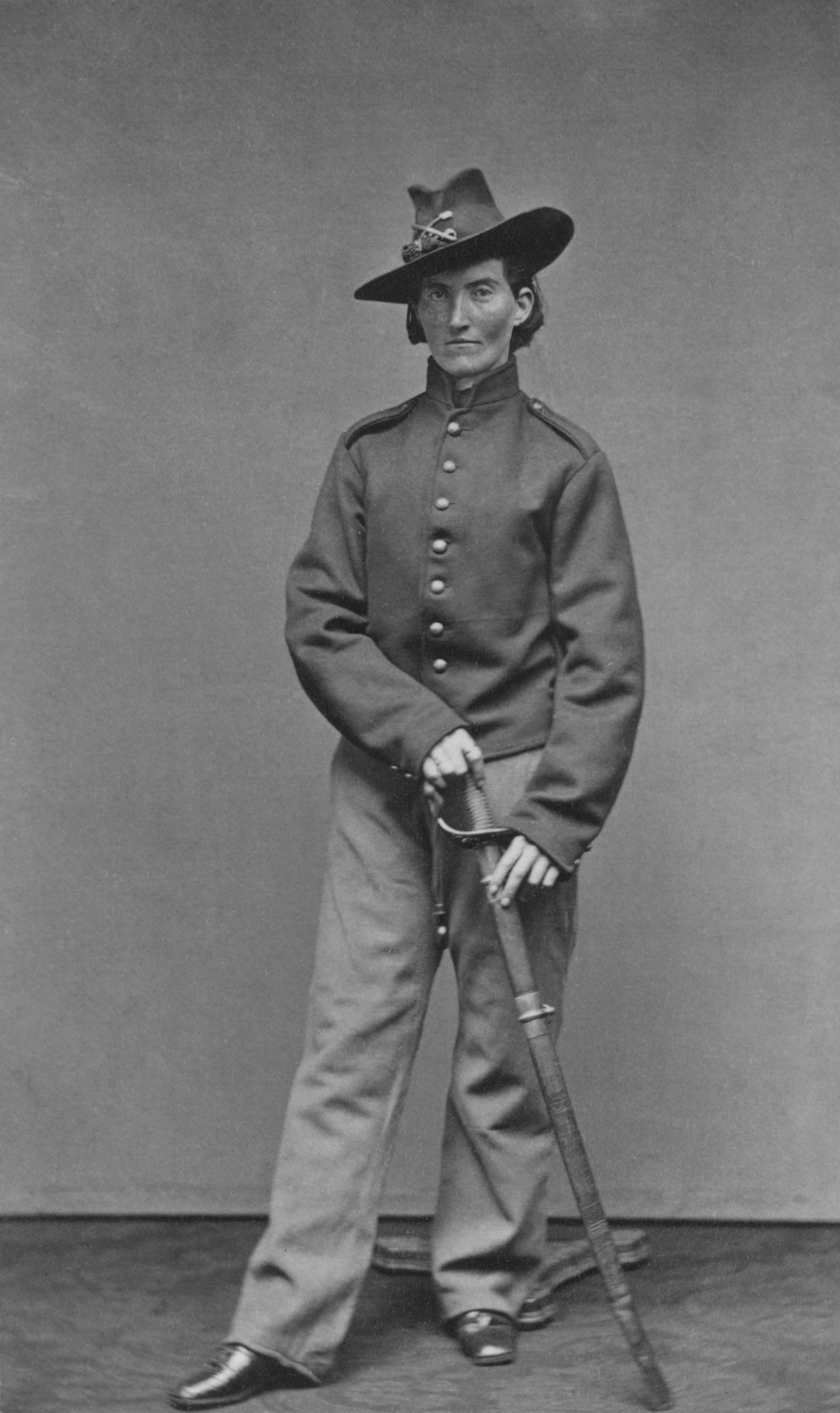

Frances Clayton in uniform. From the collection of the Minnesota Historical Society.
- Frances Clayton (c. 1830–after 1863) enlisted in the Union Army under the name Jack Williams, along with her husband. Clayton's exploits became known after the war, and there is some contradictory information in reports but most accounts say they enlisted in a Missouri unit, despite being from Minnesota. Clayton is said to have fought in 18 battles including Shiloh, Stones River, and Fort Donelson where she was wounded.
- Sarah Collins was a 16-year-old schoolgirl from Lake Mills, Wisconsin who enlisted as a soldier in a Wisconsin regiment with her brother. Although she disguised herself as a man by cutting off her hair and donned men's clothing, her sex was suspected because of how she put on her shoes and socks. She was discovered to be female before her regiment left for the front.
- At the age of fourteen, Lizzie Compton enlisted in the army, falsifying her age and changing her name. Compton saw considerable action during the war, serving in seven different regiments, holding the record for the most reenlistments. While being treated for injuries after a riding incident, the doctor revealed her status as a woman, and she was discharged. In her eighteen months in the army, she served in three cavalry units and two infantry. She fought at the Battle of Antietam and was wounded, and at the Battle of Gettysburg, where she was wounded again and discharged, and fought several other battles as well.
- Catherine E. Davidson fought at Antietam, and saw her lover wounded in the battle.

== E-H ==
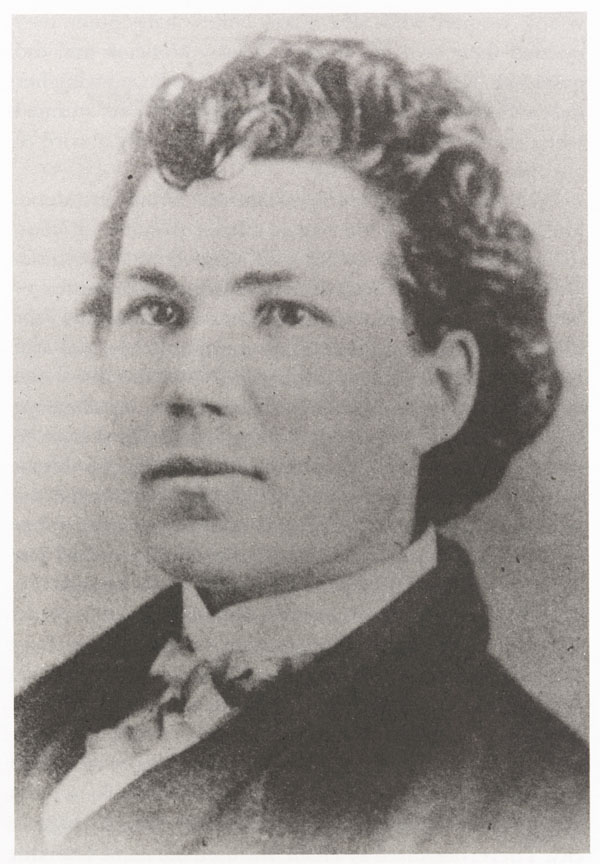
Sarah Edmonds as Franklin Thompson

- Sarah Emma Edmonds (1841–1898) served with the Union Army disguised as a man named Frank Thompson.
- Nellie Graves was a female soldier who served in secret as a man in the Union Army alongside her close friend Fanny Wilson. Both saw action at the battles of Fredericksburg and Chancellorsville. Their status as women was discovered while they were being treated for an illness, and both were discharged.
- Mary Jane Green
- Better known as "Mountain Charley", Elsa Jane Forest Guerin published a memoir about her life, purporting to relate her "thirteen years in male attire"; it was published in Iowa in 1861. She enlisted in the Union Army in Iowa as "Charles Hatfield", she spied on the Confederates and attained the rank of first lieutenant.
- Frances Hook
- Sophronia Smith Hunt (1846–1928) was an American woman who disguised herself as a man and secretly served as a soldier in the Union Army. Her first soldier husband died after he was wounded at the Battle of Jenkins' Ferry. They served in the 29th Iowa Infantry Regiment.

== I-Q ==
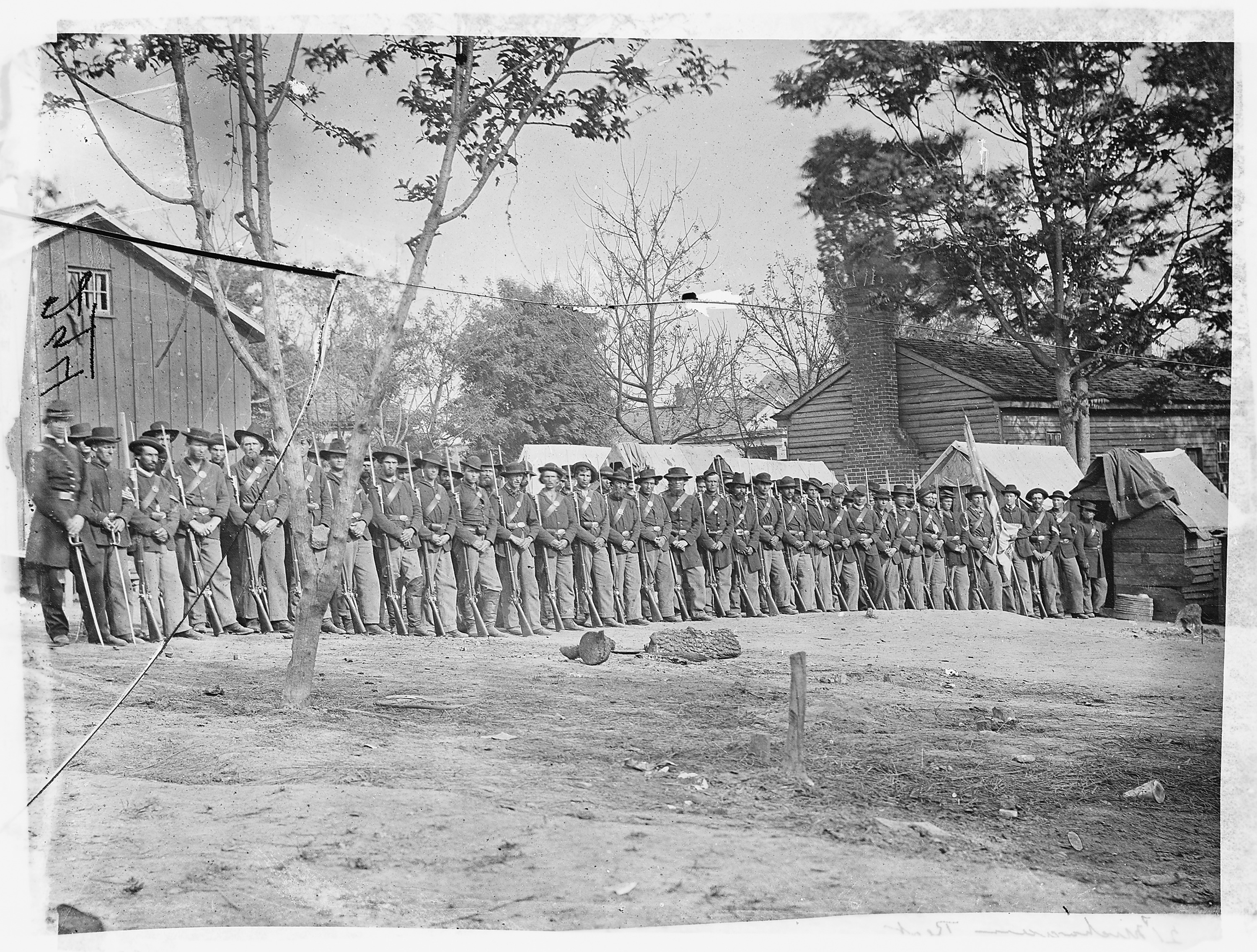
21st Michigan Infantry

- Maria Lewis, also known as George Harris, was a soldier in the Union army and former slave who gained distinction in the Eighth New York Cavalry.
- Annie Lillybridge was from Detroit, and enlisted in the 21st Michigan Infantry Regiment to be near her fiancé. She hid her identity from everyone, including even him until she was wounded and discharged after being discovered.
- Elizabeth A. Niles (1842 - 1920) served in the Union Army. After her husband enlisted in the 14th Vermont Infantry she joined him, and participated in numerous battles, including First Battle of Bull Run, Antietam, and Gettysburg. She remained undetected, and mustered out in September 1864, with her husband.
- Mary Owens enlisted with her husband in the 9th Cavalry in Pennsylvania, posing as his brother. After he died in combat, Owens remained for an additional eighteen months, fought three battles, and was wounded in each.
- Frances Elizabeth Quinn was an Irish-born Union Army soldier who fought in both the infantry and cavalry. She enlisted over five separate times throughout the war and the country, assuming the name Frank Miller, and other names. Each time she was eventually discovered to be a woman and discharged from the military. In Alabama, she was captured by the Confederate Army and force-marched to Atlanta, where she was shot during an escape attempt.

== S-Z ==
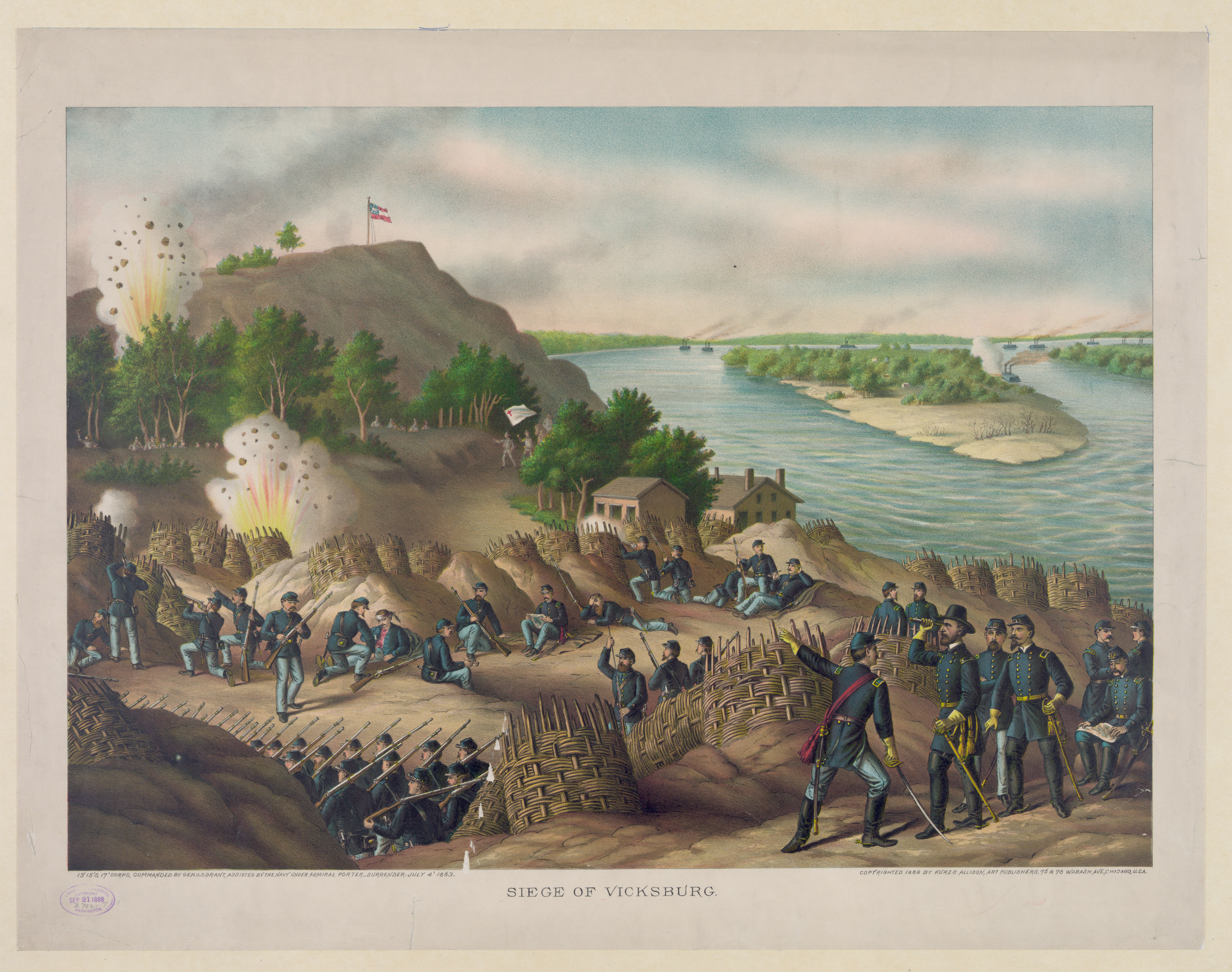
Battle of Vicksburg

- Loreta Janeta Velazquez a.k.a. "Lieutenant Harry Buford" (June 26, 1842 – c. 1897) – A Cuban woman who donned Confederate garb and served as a Confederate officer and spy during the war.
- Sarah Rosetta Wakeman (1843–1864) served with the Union Army under the alias of Lyons Wakeman and Edwin R. Wakeman. Her letters remain one of the few surviving primary accounts of female soldiers in the American Civil War.
- Laura J. Williams was a woman who disguised herself as a man and used the alias Lt. Henry Benford in order to raise and lead a company of Texas Confederates. She and the company participated in the Battle of Shiloh.
- Fanny Wilson enlisted as a soldier in the Union Army along with her close friend Nellie Graves. They served in the defense of Washington, D.C. until December 1862, when they participated in the Battle of Fredericksburg. After being treated for an illness, their sex was discovered and they were discharged. After some time as a civilian, Wilson joined the 3rd Illinois Cavalry, and was wounded at the Battle of Vicksburg. She recovered and continued on with her regiment. She was discharged after being discovered in August 1863.

=== Unknown ===
- A dismounted soldier of the 5th West Virginia cavalry, who refused to take cover from Confederate artillery bombardment until the nearby Col. Hayes (future president Rutherford B. Hayes, then commanding an infantry regiment) did so during an engagement near New River, after the battle of Cloyd Mountain, was mortally wounded by an artillery shell. The soldiers were shocked to discover this soldier was female while attempting to treat the wounds.
- Female Confederate soldier belonging to a Louisiana regiment, described by the British colonel Arthur Fremantle, who travelled through the Confederacy for over 3 months in 1863 as a war tourist. He wrote; "A goodish-looking woman was pointed out to in my car as having served as a private soldier in the battles of Perryville and Murfreesboro. Several men in my car had served with her in a Louisianian regiment, and they said she had been turned out a short time since for her bad and immoral conduct. They told me that her sex was notorious to all the regiment, but no notice had been taken of it so long as she conducted herself properly. They also said that she was not the only representative of the female sex in the ranks. When I saw her she wore a soldier's hat and coat, but had resumed her petticoats."
- Female union soldier captured during a Confederate cavalry raid on the Army of Virginia's headquarters at Cattlet's Station on August 21, 1862, during the Northern Virginia Campaign. Described by a Prussian soldier serving with J.E.B Stuart's cavalry in the confederacy; "There was a good deal of merriment among the young staff-officers at headquarters concerning one of our Catlett's Station prisoners, whom I had taken over with me under charge of a courier for further instructions - and who, just as we were sending off the main body of these prisoners to Richmond, had been discovered to be a good-looking woman in full Federal uniform. In order that she might follow to the field her warlike lord, she had enlisted as a private soldier in the same company with him, and now claimed to be excepted from the rest of the prisoners as a privilege of her sex. It was decided, however, that this modern Jeanne d'Arc must share the fate of her comrades for the present, and further decision in the case was left to the Richmond authorities."

== See also ==
- Gender stereotypes
- List of wartime cross-dressers
- List of women warriors in folklore
- Timeline of women in 19th century warfare
- Timeline of women in early modern warfare
- Timeline of women in war in the United States, Pre-1945
- Wartime cross-dressing
- Women in the military
- Women in war
- Women in warfare and the military in the 19th century
- Women warriors in literature and culture
