= Mary Owens =

Mary Owens is the name of the following women:

- Mary Owens (Abraham Lincoln fiancée) (1808–1877), engaged to Lincoln in the 1830s
- Mary Owens (soldier) (c. 1843–1881), a woman who fought in the American Civil War as a Union Army soldier
- Mary Ann Aspinwall Owens (1928–2005), American philatelist
