= Frances Hook =

Claimed Civil War veteran (1847–1908)

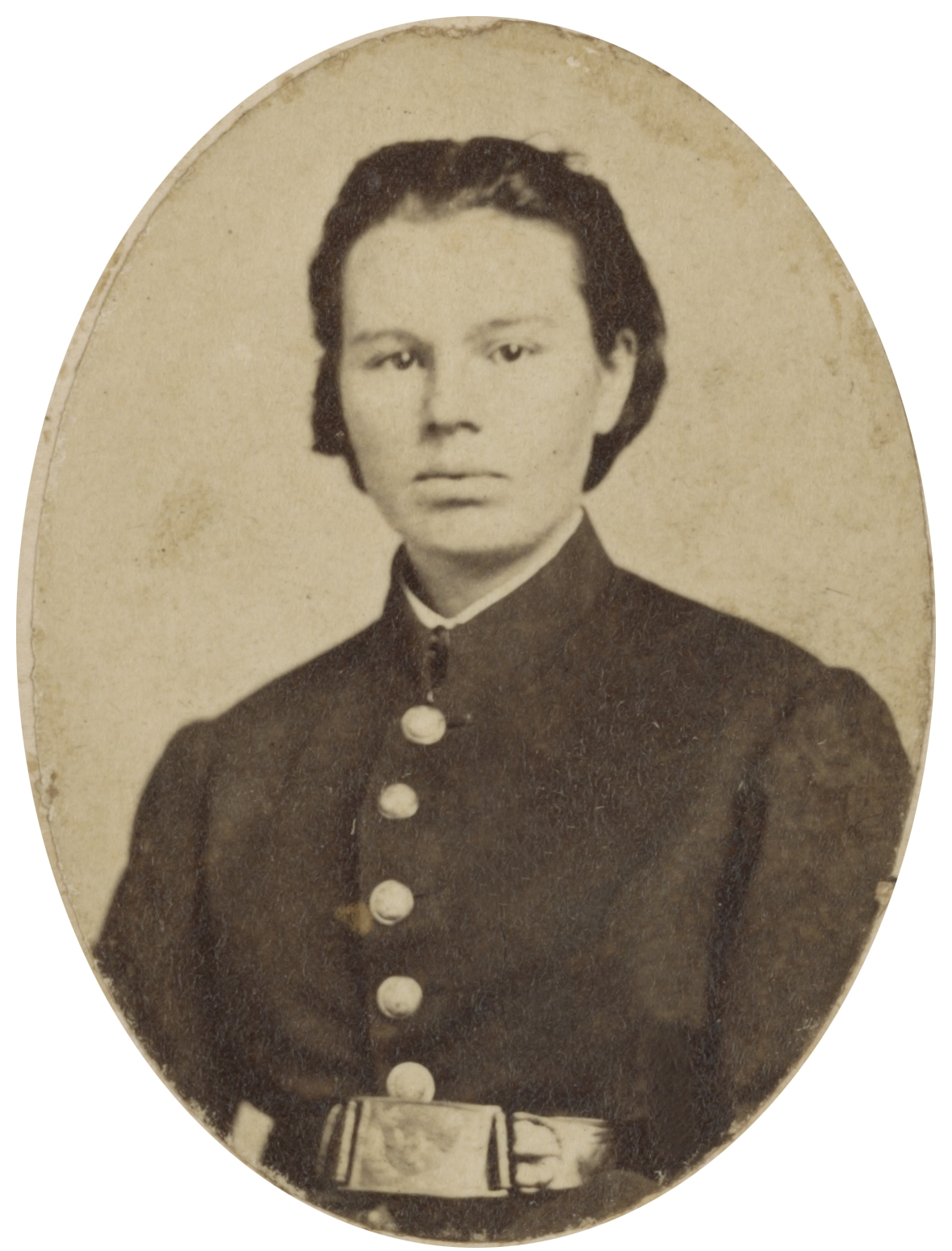
- Nicknames: Pvt. Frank Miller, Frank Henderson, Frank Fuller
- Born: 1847; Illinois, U.S.
- Died: March 17, 1908 (aged 60–61)
- Allegiance: Union Army
- Conflicts: American Civil War
- Children: Maggie

Frances Hook (1847 – March 17, 1908) claimed that she, disguised as a man, enlisted as a soldier in the Union Army during the U.S. Civil War. She stated her aliases were Pvt. Frank Miller, Frank Henderson, Frank Martin and Frank Fuller.

== Early life ==
Frances Hook was born in Illinois in 1847. When she was three years old both of her parents died, leaving only her and her older brother, who brought her up until the start of the Civil War.

At the time the Civil War began, Hook and her brother were living in Chicago, Illinois. When her brother decided to enlist in the Union Army, Hook, not wanting to be left alone, decided to disguise herself as a man and enlisted with her brother.

== Her claims of Civil War service ==
When Hook claimed to have enlisted in the Union Army she was fourteen years old, but says she told recruiters she was twenty-two. She cut her hair and enlisted in the 11th Illinois Infantry Regiment (or the 65th Illinois Home Guard depending on the source) using the alias Private Frank Miller on April 30, 1861. Hook and her brother served their 90-day term without being discovered.

On July 30, 1861, Hook and her brother re-enlisted in the 11th Illinois Infantry (or 19th Illinois Infantry Regiment depending on the source) for three more years. Their regiment fought at Fort Henry, Fort Donelson, and then at the Battle of Shiloh (April 6–7, 1862) where Hook's brother was killed. Hook was so devastated by her brother's death that she could no longer bear to serve in the same regiment he had died in.

However, Hook wished to continue her military service. Under a new alias, Frank Henderson, she enlisted in the 33rd Illinois Infantry regiment. After a few months of service she was wounded in the shoulder at the Battle of Fredericktown (October 21, 1861) in Missouri. While being treated at the regimental hospital the doctor discovered her sex; she was discharged from the army and told to go home.

Having no family to go home to, Hook enlisted in the 90th Illinois Infantry Regiment. While serving in the 90th Infantry (fighting quite often), the regiment saw combat at Holly Springs, Coldwater, the Siege of Vicksburg, the Siege of Jackson, and Missionary Ridge The regiment was marching through Florence, Alabama, in the late summer of 1863. While on the march Hook entered a seemingly empty house to search for supplies; while she was searching, two Confederate soldiers hiding in the house surprised and captured her.

Hook was imprisoned, as a man, in Atlanta, Georgia. Soon after her imprisonment she attempted an escape, but was shot in the thigh and taken to the prison hospital. While being treated another doctor discovered her true sex. Hook was moved to a separate room and put on a list of prisoners to be exchanged. On February 17, 1864, Hook was one of twenty-seven Union prisoners exchanged at Graysville, Georgia.

During her imprisonment she told her story to Confederate doctors and officers. The Confederacy was so impressed by her actions she received a letter from Confederate President Jefferson Davis offering her a commission if she would fight for the Confederate army. Hook refused stating she would rather serve in the Union Army as a private than in the Confederate army as a lieutenant. She went on to state she would rather be hanged than fight against the Union.

When Dr. Mary Edwards Walker, a Union Army surgeon, heard this report she argued Hook should be made a lieutenant in the Union Army, but was ignored. Because Dr. Walker was thrilled about the news of a female soldier, she notified the press. Hook consented to interviews, but refused to give her real name. She promised newspaper reporters that she would go home, though many doubted her.

Frances Hook was again discharged and told to go home. The officers who were in charge of sending her home alerted recruitment authorities, "advising them to be on the lookout for her trying to rejoin the service." With no home to go to some speculate she enlisted again; however, there is no substantial proof she did.

== Later life ==
Hook eventually married, and had a daughter named Maggie. After her mother's death, on March 17, 1908, Maggie Dickson wrote to the War Department seeking confirmation of Frances Hook's military service. The letter was forwarded to the Adjutant General's Office, who was able to locate a record of Hook's medical treatment in which she claimed to be a soldier in the 90th Illinois, though there was no record in the files of the War Department to corroborate her service claims.

== See also ==
- List of female American Civil War soldiers
