= Florena Budwin =

Believed to be the first woman buried in an American National Cemetery

- Born: c.1844
- Died: January 25, 1865 (aged 20–21)
- Burial place: Florence National Cemetery
- Other name: Florina Budwin
- Military career
- Allegiance: Union
- Branch: Union army

Florena Budwin (or Florina Budwin) (c. 1844 – January 25, 1865) was an American Union Army soldier from Philadelphia who, disguised as a man, enlisted with her husband, an artillery captain, in the American Civil War in order to stay with him. After being captured, she died of complications of pneumonia. She was buried in Florence National Cemetery.

Sometime after February 1864, she was captured and confined at the Confederacy's most notoriously brutal prisoner of war concentration camp, Andersonville, shortly after it was created. Some reports state that her husband died at Andersonville. However, Budwin herself stated that her husband died in battle, after which she was captured. A soldier who saw her there (Samuel Elliott, 7th Penna. Reserves) described her as "a woman rather above the medium height, sunburnt, with long, unkempt hair. Her clothing consisted of a rough gray shirt, a pair of worn-out army trousers, and what was once a military cap." She remained at Andersonville until it was threatened by Union forces, and was then transferred to the Florence Stockade in Florence, South Carolina in the fall.

There, she attended to sick prisoners until she herself became ill with pneumonia in the winter; when Dr. Josephus Hall gave her medical attention, he discovered her sex. After that, Budwin was given special treatment, including donations of food, clothing from local women, and her own room. However, she died shortly thereafter at the age of 20 on January 25, 1865, less than a month before sick Union prisoners of war were released by the Confederacy. Little is known about her military service except for her time in prison. Florena Budwin may not even have been her real name.

An estimated 15,000 Union prisoners were held captive in the Florence Prison Stockade between September 1864 and February 1865. In that short period of time, 2,738 prisoners died from malnutrition and disease. The owner of a plantation adjacent to the prison allowed the dead to be buried in trenches on his property. This area was later established as the Florence National Cemetery. A plain marble headstone there bears Florena's name and the date of her death.

Larry Eggleston's book Women in the Civil War: Extraordinary Stories of Soldiers, Spies, Nurses, Doctors, Crusaders, and Others says Budwin was the first woman to be buried in a national cemetery. However, Sarah Rosetta Wakeman, another woman who disguised herself as a man to fight in the Civil War, was buried (under her alias name, Lyons Wakeman) in Chalmette National Cemetery in New Orleans after her death June 1864, six months before Budwin's death and burial.

== See also ==
- List of female American Civil War soldiers
- Timeline of women in war in the United States, pre-1945
