= Mary and Molly Bell =

American Confederate Army soldiers

Mary and Molly (or "Mollie") Bell were two young women from Pulaski County, Virginia who disguised themselves as men and fought in the American Civil War for the Confederacy. The pair successfully managed to keep their gender hidden from their fellow soldiers and the military for two years while fighting in several major battles, until they were discovered and incarcerated. Soon thereafter, the women were released from prison and forced to return home.

== Early life ==
Mary and Molly were cousins who grew up together in the mountains of Southwest Virginia on a typical farm, small and rural. The girls learned how to ride horses and hunt for food, and through working on the farm and helping provide for their family, became accustomed to the hard work and dedication that would be required of them in the military.

In the fall of 1862, the girls' uncle decided to leave home to fight for the Union, based on his belief that the Confederacy would lose the war. Both cousins had a great deal of patriotism for their homeland and were infuriated when they realized what their uncle had done. In order to compensate for their uncle's disloyalty, twenty-two-year-old Molly, the more passionate and impulsive leader of the two, devised a plan for the pair to disguise themselves as men and enlist in the Confederate States Army. Molly was able to convince Mary, only fifteen years old at the time and more reserved than her cousin, to enlist with her.

== Military life ==
The women disguised themselves by cutting their hair, wearing thick woolen shirts to conceal their figures, lowering their voices and walking like men. Mary and Molly's voices were already not much higher than those of the adolescent males who enlisted in the army, so they were not conspicuous when speaking in their slightly lower voices. The girls enlisted in the army under false identities; Mary enlisted as Tom Parker, and Molly enlisted as Bob Morgan (also listed as "Bob Martin"). Because of their riding skills they were quickly assigned to the Confederate cavalry.

After less than one month in the army, Union forces captured the Confederate cavalry unit. However, within a few hours of their capture the forces of General John Hunt Morgan liberated the Confederate cavalrymen. Once they had regained their freedom, Mary and Molly switched to the infantry division. The couple fought under the command of General Jubal A. Early throughout the Shenandoah Valley. Mary and Molly fought in several key battles of the Civil War, including the Battle of Chancellorsville, the Battle of Gettysburg, and at the Spotsylvania Court House where Early and his men defeated General Burnside. Both women were commended for their fighting skill and dedication, known to their fellow soldiers as "gallant, first-class fighting men." Mary and Molly were also known for their boldness, proclaiming "if all the women of the Confederacy were as patriotic as they, the country would have been free long ago." Mary and Molly demonstrated their bravery several times in battle; one night while Molly was on guard duty, Union soldiers began to attack the camp. Molly promptly signaled the alarm and killed three Union soldiers with only a muzzleloader, a significant accomplishment for any soldier. Due to their heroism during the attack, Molly was promoted to sergeant, and Mary became a corporal.

In order to keep their secret, Mary and Molly realized that they would have to reveal their true identities to someone in the army who could protect them. The girls chose a young captain as their confidante, who protected them from physical exams and other duties which could have put them at risk of discovery. At one point in battle, Molly was injured by a shell fragment that struck her arm. Soldiers came to aid Molly, but fearing that someone would fetch a doctor, she quickly claimed that the wound was "just a scratch." Later Molly allowed Mary to tend to the wound, and Molly made a full recovery.

== Discovery and imprisonment ==
On October 19, 1864, at the Battle of Cedar Creek, the Bells' young captain confidante was taken prisoner by the forces of General Philip Sheridan. Mary and Molly decided they needed to quickly confide in another officer and selected a young lieutenant who had recently been placed in command of their company. The lieutenant did not keep the Bells' secret, but quickly reported their status to General Early. Authorities immediately detained Mary, age seventeen, and Molly, age twenty-four, at the Confederate prison of Castle Thunder in Richmond, Virginia.

Once incarcerated, Molly proclaimed that she knew of six other women in disguise within General Early's ranks. Mary and Molly claimed their only reason for enlisting in the army was patriotism, and they simply wanted to return to the army. Nevertheless, General Early claimed that the women were prostitutes or "common camp followers" and were "the means of demoralizing several hundred men" in his command. The Bells, along with other women discovered, were accused by the Richmond Daily Examiner as only assuming their disguises to "follow the army and hide their iniquity," and were even blamed for General Early's failure in the 1864 Shenandoah Valley campaign. The Bells' comrades vouched that the pair had "done good service as soldiers without at all exciting suspicions... as to their sex." Even extreme conservative activist Edmund Ruffin thought Mary and Molly Bell "proved themselves fine soldiers... and should be allowed to stay in the service."

After three weeks of imprisonment, no specific charges were brought against Mary and Molly. As a result, the cousins were released from Castle Thunder. They were not permitted to re-enter the army, and were instead sent back on their horses to Pulaski, dressed in the same Confederate uniforms in which they were imprisoned.

== See also ==
- List of female American Civil War soldiers
- List of wartime cross-dressers
- Mollie Bean
