= Maria Lewis (soldier) =

Former slave who, as a cross-dresser, served as a Union soldier

- Born: Maria Lewis c. 1846; Albemarle County, Virginia
- Died: Unknown
- Other name: George Harris
- Military career
- Allegiance: Union Army
- Service years: 1863-1865
- Rank: Private
- Unit: Company C of the 8th New York Cavalry
- Conflicts: Battle of Waynesboro, Virginia, Battle of Gettysburg

Maria Lewis, also known by the alias George Harris, was a Union Civil War soldier, and former slave, who gained distinction in the Eighth New York Cavalry.

== Biography ==
Lewis was born around 1846, in Albemarle County, Virginia, where she and her family were kept as slaves. At the age of seventeen, she emancipated herself from slavery by disguising herself as a "darkly tanned" white man, and joining company C of the 8th New York Cavalry. She adopted the name George Harris, after the character from Uncle Tom's Cabin, who similarly escaped by passing himself for a Spanish man. She originally planned to use the identity to travel North, she decided to stay with the army, after finding she enjoyed the freedom life as a white man brought her. Lewis remained with General Philip Sheridan's cavalry unit in the Shenandoah Valley for an additional eighteen months. While serving, she fought at the Battle of Waynesboro on the second of March. Lewis distinguished herself amongst her fellow soldiers, and became a member of the honor guard assigned to present seventeen captured rebel flags to the Secretary of War, Edwin Stanton. She became friends with an abolitionist family from New York, the Wilburs, and after her service, she came to them and confessed to being a woman. The family gave her skirts, and found her a place to work. Lewis later received "lessons" from Julia's sister, Frances, presumably learning to read and write, of which was barred to enslaved people prior to the civil war. Little is known about her life after the war.

== See also ==
- List of female American Civil War soldiers
- Cathay Williams
- Loreta Janeta Velázquez
- Mary Bowser
