= Nellie Graves =

Nellie Graves was a female soldier who served, in secret, in the Union Army during the American Civil War alongside her close friend Fanny Wilson. Both saw action at the battles of Fredericksburg and Chancellorsville. Their genders were shortly discovered while they were being treated for an illness. Both were discharged and went their separate ways for the rest of the war. Wilson chose to reenlist in disguise again. There is some speculation as to whether Graves did the same, but if she had reenlisted, she was not discovered for a second time.

== Before the Civil War ==
Nellie Graves traveled with her friend, Fanny Wilson, to Lafayette, Indiana, in 1860 to visit Wilson's distant family members. During their stay, both women met and fell in love with two men, and exchanged letters with them for a year when the girls when back to New York. But as Civil War started brewing in 1861, Graves and Wilson received news from their lovers that stated their intention to enlist in the Union Army in the 24th New Jersey Infantry. In response, both women plotted to enlist in the same regiment as their loved ones but in different companies to avoid being caught.

== The Civil War ==
Graves and Wilson were quite content with Army life and training as long as they were close to their lovers. Their first assignment was to be part of the defense force in Washington D.C. The Regiment was then called into action at Fredericksburg from December 11 to 13 1862. The combat experience instilled new purpose in the women, and they became motivated to perform well for the benefit of the Union.

On May 1 to 4 of 1863, their regiment took part in the Battle of Chancellorsville. Wilson's lover became mortally wounded and died while under her care. Shortly afterward, both women came down with an unknown illness and were sent to recuperate in Cairo, Illinois. It was in the army hospital there that they were discovered and discharged from the army. The two friends parted ways, and while Wilson reenlisted, it is unknown if Graves done the same.

== See also ==
- List of female American Civil War soldiers
