= Mollie Bean =

Confederate Army soldier

- Other name: Melvin Bean
- Military career
- Allegiance: Confederate States of America
- Branch: Confederate States Army
- Unit: 47th North Carolina Infantry
- Conflicts: American Civil War

Mollie Bean was a North Carolinian woman who, pretending to be a man, joined the 47th North Carolina Infantry, a regiment of the Confederate army in the American Civil War.

== Civil War service ==
Mollie Bean took on the name of Melvin Bean and was captured in uniform by Confederate forces outside Richmond, Virginia, on the night of February 17, 1865. When questioned, she said she had served with the 47th North Carolina Infantry for two years and been twice wounded, but neither of these wounds led to her discovery. Bean was described in the press as "manifestly crazy" and charged with being a "suspicious character", i.e. a spy. She was incarcerated at Richmond's wartime prison Castle Thunder, where Mary and Molly Bell were held prisoners in October 1864.

Her captain was reported to be John Thorp. The Richmond Whig, which reported Bean's discovery on February 20, 1865, assumed that other soldiers in the company knew Bean was a woman; according to historian Elizabeth D. Leonard, this was likely not true.

A fictionalized version of Bean is a major character in Harry Turtledove's alternative history novel The Guns of the South, where she is cast as a former prostitute.

== See also ==
- List of female American Civil War soldiers
- List of wartime cross-dressers
- Mary and Molly Bell
- Timeline of women in war in the United States, pre-1945
