= Mary Jane Green =

Confederate spy and bushwhacker

- Born: 1839 or 1846; Sutton, Braxton County (now West Virginia)
- Education: Illiterate
- Occupations: Spy, Mail Carrier
- Known for: Bushwhacking in Braxton County
- Criminal charges: Spying, Bushwhacking, Bad Temper
- Criminal penalty: Imprisonment, on seven occasions.
- Spouse: William Watson (m. 1864)
- Espionage activity
- Allegiance: Confederate States of America

Mary Jane Green was a Confederate spy and bushwhacker.

Arrested multiple times for acts like smuggling intelligence and sabotaging telegraph wires, she was infamously rebellious, once attacking a guard who had untied her with a brick. Green fervently supported the Confederacy. Records last place her being transferred between prisons during the Civil War.

== Early life and education ==
Possible marriage record of Mary Jane Green

Not much is known about Mary Jane Green's early life. She claims to have been born in Sutton, Braxton County (currently known as West Virginia). Green's level of education was unknown, but she was illiterate. Considering her lack of education she probably came from a poor family. According to public records, she was likely either born around 1839 or 1846, as there was a Mary Jane Green living in Sutton who was 11 at the time of the 1850 census. Records indicate that she may have also been the Mary Jane Green who married William Watson during the war, in Jefferson, West Virginia in 1864, at age 18, which puts her age closer to surviving descriptions of her. She had three brothers, who also became guerillas.

== Civil War ==
At the time of her first arrest in August 1861 for smuggling confederate intelligence, Green was described as a teenager. She was incarcerated in Wheeling, Virginia until that December, when she managed to offend General Rosencrans so greatly that he had her sent to her home county in hopes that the Union troops there would shoot her. She was required to swear an oath to the U.S. in order to be released, which she did with no sincerity. Upon her release she was arrested again in May 1862, this time for cutting telegraph wires near Weston, Virginia in men's clothes. That April she was released on parole and then re-incarcerated for a bad attitude. She was reportedly arrested seven separate times.

Green was steadfastly loyal to the Confederacy and raged and spat vitriol at every Union soldier she encountered, even while arrested. At one point in Antheneum, she had to be tied down, and when a guard took pity and untied her after she calmed, Green attacked him with a brick.

The last known records of her are during the Civil War, when she was transferred from prison in Atheneum to the official Union and Confederate exchange point in City Point, Virginia.

== See also ==
- List of female American Civil War soldiers
