= Catherine E. Davidson =

Catherine E. Davidson lived in the United States during the Civil War Era. Davidson dressed up like a man to join the Union Army and stay close to her fiancé. She fought in the Battle of Antietam and was seriously wounded. Because of this injury, she did not go back into the army. Soon after she was found out to be a woman.

== Joining the Union Army ==
Catherine E. Davidson lived in Sheffield, Ohio, with her fiancé. While in Ohio, her husband enlisted to fight in the Union Army. To stay close to her fiancé, she joined too. Because she could not enlist as a woman, she dressed up like a man. In disguise, she was able to enlist in the army. The two enlisted into 28th Ohio Infantry.

== The Battle of Antietam ==
While in the 28th Ohio Infantry, Davidson and her fiancé fought in the Battle of Antietam in the year 1862. During the battle, Catherine Davidson's fiancé was killed on the battlefield. Davidson was shot in the right arm, however the injury was not fatal. She was rescued by Pennsylvania governor Andrew Curtin.

== Interaction with Andrew Curtin ==
Pennsylvania governor Andrew Curtin was one of many who came to the battlefield to help take care of wounded soldiers. Andrew Curtin carried Catherine E. Davidson to the ambulance, when she was shot in the right arm. Davidson ended up surviving the shot, however doctors had to amputate her arm halfway between her shoulder and elbow. Because of her amputation, and the revelation of her sex, Catherine E. Davidson was not able to go back to fight.

Davidson felt she had to thank Pennsylvania governor Andrew Curtin in person for saving her life out on the battlefield. Curtin had no idea that Davidson was a woman. When Davidson visited Curtin, he was shocked to see her as a woman and alive. Curtin also offered to return the ring Davidson gave to him on the battlefield on the way to the ambulance. Davidson refused to take the ring back and she said, "The finger that used to wear that ring will never wear it again. The hand is dead but the soldier lives on."

== See also ==
- Albert Cashier
- Fanny Wilson
- List of female American Civil War soldiers
- List of wartime cross-dressers
