= Charles M. Holton =

American Civil War Medal of Honor recipient

Charles Maynard Holton
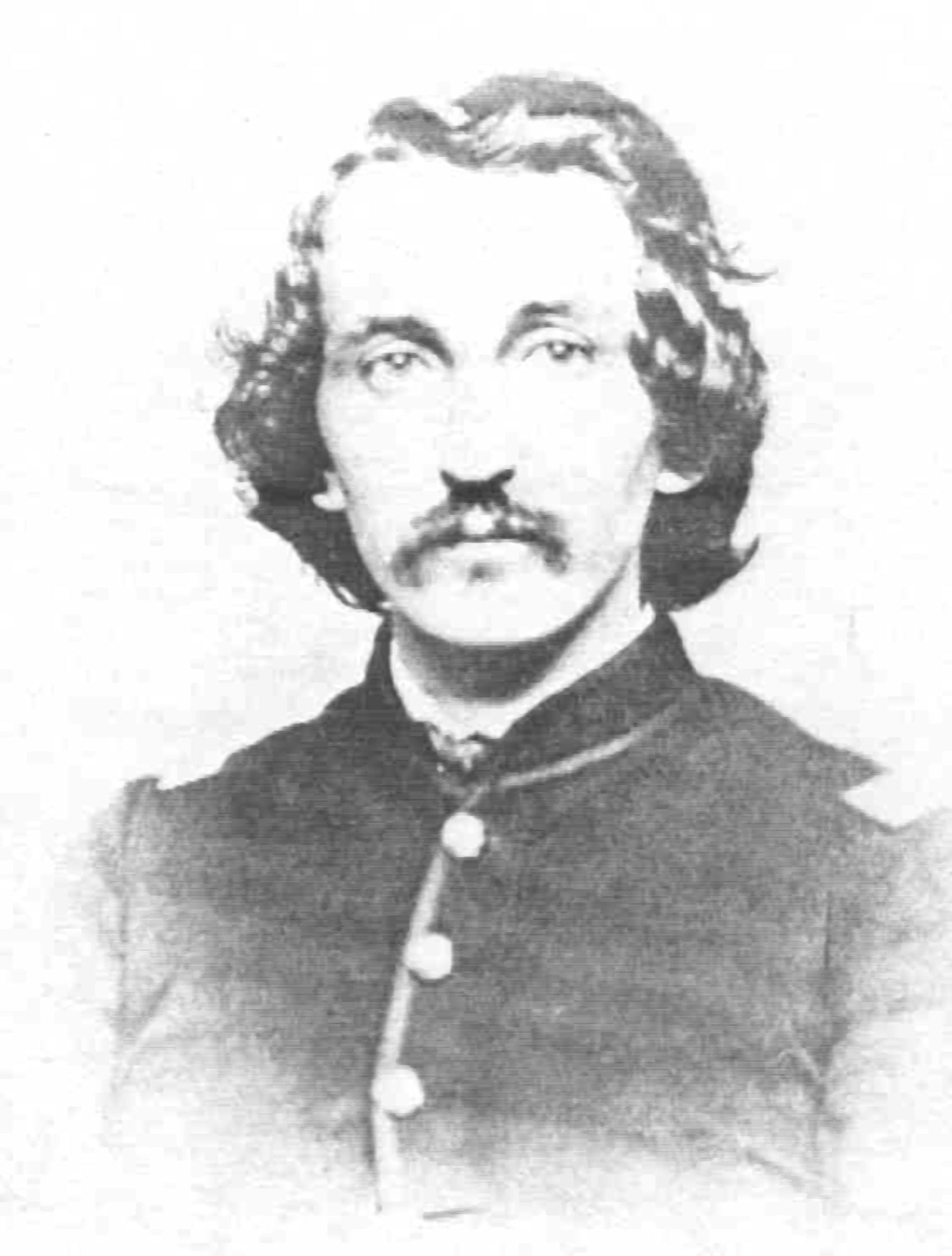
- Holton c. 1865
- Born: May 25, 1838; Potter, New York, US
- Died: August 22, 1899 (aged 61); Yakima, Washington, US
- Burial place: Oak Hill Cemetery; Battle Creek, Michigan, US
- Military career
- Allegiance: United States
- Branch: United States Army
- Rank: First Lieutenant
- Units: (New York (state)) Company A, 7th Michigan Cavalry
- Conflicts: American Civil War: Battle of Gettysburg; Battle of Williamsport
- Awards: Medal of Honor

Charles M. Holton (May 25, 1838 – August 22, 1899) was an American soldier who fought with the Union Army in the American Civil War. Holton received the United States' highest award for bravery during combat, the Medal of Honor, for actions taken on July 14, 1863 during the Battle of Williamsport.

== Early life ==
Holton was born in Potter, New York but as a young man moved to Battle Creek, Michigan around 1860. His brother, Samuel, had moved to Michigan earlier to establish his medical practice. Holton earned a law degree and began practicing in Battle Creek before the onset of the Civil War.

== Civil War service ==
Holton enlisted with the 7th Michigan Cavalry during the onset of the American Civil War. His company was present in many major battles, including the Battle of Gettysburg, and the Battle of Williamsport where he earned the Medal of Honor for capturing the enemy's colors.

== Medal of Honor citation ==
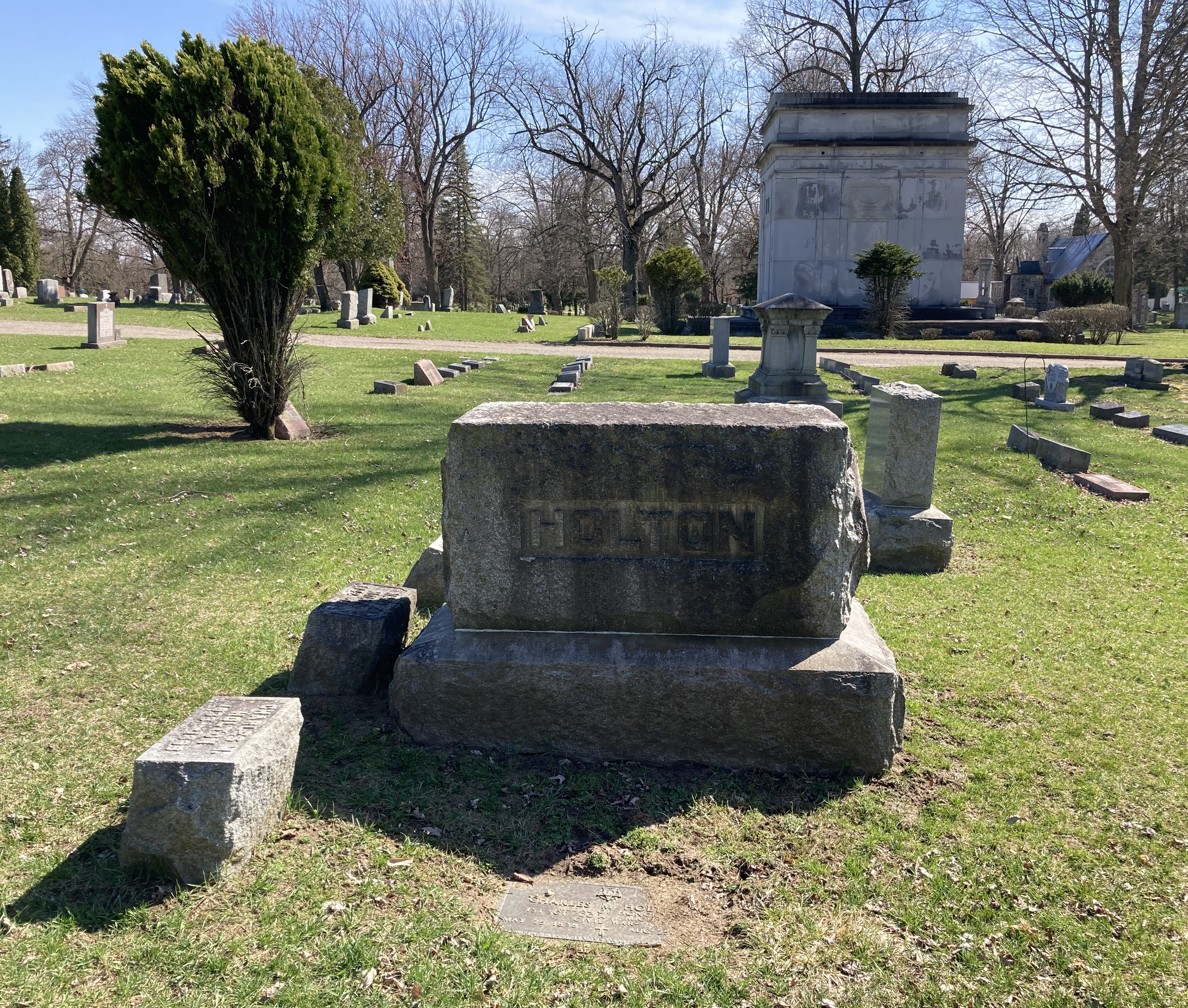
Holton's grave at Oak Hill Cemetery

The President of the United States of America, in the name of Congress, takes pleasure in presenting the Medal of Honor to First Sergeant Charles Myron Holton, United States Army, for extraordinary heroism on 14 July 1863, while serving with Company A, 7th Michigan Cavalry, in action at Falling Waters, Virginia, for capture of flag of 55th Virginia Infantry (Confederate States of America). In the midst of the battle with foot soldiers he dismounted to capture the flag.

== Personal life ==
Holton married Mary Thisler of Constantine, Michigan in 1864.

He died from heart disease at his home in Yakima, Washington on August 22, 1899. He was buried at Oak Hill Cemetery in Battle Creek, Michigan.
