= Frances Elizabeth Quinn =

American Civil War soldier

Frances Elizabeth Quinn was an Irish-born Union Civil War soldier who fought in both the infantry and cavalry. She enlisted over five separate times throughout the war and the country. Each time she was eventually discovered to be a woman and discharged from the military.

== Early life ==
Quinn's parents immigrated from Ireland to La Moille, Illinois when she was three years old. Shortly after arriving in Illinois, her mother gave birth to a brother, named Thomas, and then both parents died, leaving the children in the care of two separate families. Frances became a surrogate daughter to the Reno family, and a surrogate niece of Jesse Lee Reno, while her brother became a member of the Cokeley family. When Quinn was 12, she was sent to a convent in Virginia to be educated. She returned to La Moille to find her brother had run away to join the army at the age of fourteen, in the 52nd Illinois Infantry Regiment. Quinn was determined not to be abandoned, and decided to join too, despite being sixteen years of age.

== Civil War ==
Quinn adopted the name B. Frank Miller, and enlisted in a three-month unit in Indiana, disguising herself as a man. In July, 1862, she joined the 2nd Regiment Tennessee Volunteer Cavalry, where she was almost immediately discharged from duty. In August 1862, she joined under a different name the 90th Illinois Infantry Regiment. The next month, she was discovered by Colonel Timothy O'Meara, and she was dismissed. To him, she gave her "true name" as Eliza Miller. She enlisted for the fourth time, managing to stay long enough to fight at the Battle of Stones River on December 31, where she was shot in the shoulder, and her sex was discovered a third time. She left to Bowling Green, Kentucky, where she located a recruiting sergeant, and entered into a cavalry division as a teamster. While on duty, she came across another female soldier whom she had known in her brief time in the 2nd Cavalry, who had taken the name of Frank Morton, alias Sarah Bradbury. They were thought to both have gotten drunk, and fallen in a nearby river, where they were cited for disorderly behavior. Neither would tell the officers how they knew each other, and were found out as women. The women were reportedly put in dresses and provided means to return home by General Sheridan, Quinn giving herself a new alibi, calling herself Ellie Reno, a niece of Jesse Reno. She returned home, but in April 1863, she learned that her brother had been killed in the Battle of Shiloh. Grief-stricken, she rejoined the army under the name of Frank Martin, eventually becoming an orderly to General Jeremiah Boyle. She was very successful, bringing in rebels to a Union Military prison in Louisville, Kentucky, and hired to do light duty at the prison barracks. She impressed General Boyle, and became the favorite of the 25th Michigan Volunteer Infantry Regiment also working there. Unfortunately, a soldier recognized her as a woman, and she was once again discharged. She wrote a letter to President Abraham Lincoln, begging him to give her a pardon and allow her to remain in service.

I do not wish you to think me bold as I write to you wholy out of love for my native Country I am the true blue and for that Noble Flag I am willing to die I have been in the Army for nearly one year and I wish to see it over I am willing to do any thing to aid or assist to Government that lies in my power for my Country I have lived [illegible] and for my Country I will die -Ellie B. Reno (Frances Quinn)

Quinn was then sent to General Ambrose Burnside, where she was put in the care of an officer's wife, and offered a job at a Louisville hospital. Around this time, Quinn was said to have married a "good-looking and gallant Captain" with the last name Steward, who died soon after their marriage. In October, 1863, Quinn was back in the army, once again in the 90th Illinois Infantry Regiment under the name Frank Miller. She was captured by Confederates in Alabama, and forced to march to a prison camp in Atlanta, Georgia. She attempted to escape, but was shot in the calf and re-captured. In prison, her sex was discovered, and she was placed in a room at a local hospital. Her wound became infected, and she lay ill for nearly two months. On February 17, 1864, she was exchanged as a prisoner to the Union Army. She stayed in the Nashville hospital until her leg healed, and then received her pay and lived in Ohio until the war ended.

== Later life ==
On August 12, 1866, Quinn married Mathew Angel, a soldier from the 2nd Ohio Heavy Artillery. They had two daughters, named Maggie and Mary. Quinn died of edema on June 8, 1872.

== Appearance ==
A reporter from the Louisville Journal describes Quinn as being "Small, with auburn hair, blue eyes, and a complexion tanned by the sun." General Sheridan said she was "coarse and masculine, with large features...She could have easily passed for a man."

== See also ==
- List of female American Civil War soldiers
