= Elsa Jane Forest Guerin =

Frontier-era American woman who dressed as a man

- Other name: Mountain Charley
- Occupations: Cabin boy, brakeman, trader, saloon owner, spy
- Years active: Mid-nineteenth-century
- Spouse: H. L. Guerin (m. 1860)
- Children: 2
- Military career
- Nickname: Charles Hatfield
- Allegiance: United States
- Service: Union Army
- Rank: First lieutenant
- War: American Civil War

Elsa Jane Forest Guerin, better known as Mountain Charley, is thought to have been a woman who dressed as a man for most of her life. She lived in the American frontier for most of her life, and served in the American Civil War.

She first dressed as a man to find work, and move west. Guerin enlisted to fight in the Civil War, and was promoted to first lieutenant for her work. She published a memoir about her life, Mountain Charley: Or, The adventures of Mrs. E. J. Guerin, who was thirteen years in male attire; an autobiography comprising a period of thirteen years life in the States, California, and Pike's Peak. There is some speculation as to whether she really existed.

== Biography ==
When Guerin was 5 years old, she was sent to attend school in New Orleans. Little is known about Guerin's early life. In her memoir, she writes that she was married at twelve, and, at fifteen, she had two children. Her husband was shot by a member of his riverboat crew and Guerin left her children with the Sisters of Mercy, dressing as a man to find work. She would dress as a woman once a month to meet her children, and otherwise worked as a cabin attendant on a steamer along the St. Louis-New Orleans route. In the 1850s she travelled to Sacramento Valley to find her husband's killer. She tried mining for gold but wrote that her strength was "not sufficient for the business" of prospecting. She opened a saloon, eventually buying a ranch called Shasta. Guerin would also work as a cabin boy, an Illinois Central Railroad brakeman, and a trader for the American Fur Company. Two years later, Guerin was in Colorado, running a bar and bakery, with the saloon being called the Mountain Boy's Saloon. While there, she found her husband's murderer, and engaged in a shootout with him, during which they were both wounded. Around 1860, she married her barkeeper, H. L. Guerin. Guerin said of her time:

I began to rather like the freedom of my new character. I could go where I chose, do many things, which while innocent in themselves, were debarred by propriety from association with the female sex. The change from the cumbersome, unhealthy attire of women to the more convenient, healthy habiliments of a man, was in itself almost sufficient to compensate for its unwomanly character.

— Elsa Guerin

The following year, Guerin moved to St. Joseph, Missouri, where she would write her autobiography, Mountain Charley: Or, The adventures of Mrs. E. J. Guerin, who was thirteen years in male attire; an autobiography comprising a period of thirteen years life in the States, California, and Pike's Peak. That book was first published in Dubuque, Iowa, in 1861. Subsequently, she enlisted for the Union Army as "Charles Hatfield" in Iowa and served in the Civil War, where she spied on Confederate forces dressed in women's clothing, eventually becoming first lieutenant.

== See also ==
- List of female American Civil War soldiers
