= Mary Burns (soldier) =

American female soldier disguised as a man

- Born: Mary Burns
- Other name: John Burns
- Military career
- Unit: 7th Michigan Volunteer Cavalry Regiment

Mary Burns or John Burns was an American woman who disguised herself as a man in order to fight in the American Civil War. She enlisted in the 7th Michigan Volunteer Cavalry Regiment in order not to be parted from her lover, who was in the same regiment. Her sex was discovered ten days after being recognized by an acquaintance, before her company had left Detroit. She was arrested in uniform, held in the city jail, charged with masquerading as a man, and sent home. The account of the incident in the Detroit Advertiser and Tribune (February 25, 1863) described the defendant as "a very pretty woman".

== See also ==
- List of female American Civil War soldiers
