= 28th Ohio Infantry Regiment =

- Active: June 10, 1861, to July 13, 1865
- Country: United States
- Allegiance: Union
- Branch: Union Army
- Type: Infantry
- Engagements: Battle of Carnifex Ferry; Battle of Princeton Court House; Battle of South Mountain; Battle of Antietam; Battle of Droop Mountain; Battle of New Market; Battle of Piedmont

The 28th Ohio Infantry Regiment was an infantry regiment in the Union Army during the American Civil War. It was frequently referred to as the 2nd German Ohio Regiment.

== Service ==
The 28th Ohio Infantry Regiment was organized at Camp Dennison near Cincinnati, Ohio, beginning June 10, 1861, and mustered in July 6, 1861, for three years service under the command of Colonel August Moor.

The regiment was attached to 2nd Brigade, Army of Occupation, West Virginia, to October 1861. McCook's 2nd Brigade, District of the Kanawha, West Virginia, to March 1862. 2nd Brigade, Kanawha Division, Department of the Mountains, to September 1862. 2nd Brigade, Kanawha Division, IX Corps, Army of the Potomac, to October 1862. 2nd Brigade, Kanawha Division, District of West Virginia, Department of the Ohio, to March 1863. Averill's 4th Separate Brigade, VIII Corps, Middle Department, to June 1863. Averill's 4th Separate Brigade, Department of West Virginia, to December 1863. 1st Brigade, 4th Division, West Virginia, to April 1864. 1st Brigade, 1st Infantry, Division West Virginia, to June 1864. Reserve Division of West Virginia, until July 1865.

The 28th Ohio Infantry mustered out of service at Wheeling, West Virginia, on July 13, 1865.

== Detailed service ==
Moved to Point Pleasant, Va., July 31. Moved from Point Pleasant, Va., to Clarksburg, August 11–12, 1861, then to Buckhannon, August 17–19, to Bulltown August 28–29, to Sutton September 1 and to Summerville September 7–9. Battle of Carnifex Ferry, Va., September 10. March to Camp Lookout and Big Sewell Mountain September 15–23. Retreat to Camp Anderson October 6–9. Operations in the Kanawha Valley and New River Region October 19-November 17. New River October 19–21. Moved to Gauley December 6, and duty there until May 1862. Advance on Virginia & Tennessee Railroad May 10. Princeton May 11–15-16 and 17. Wolf Creek May 15. At Flat Top Mountain until August. Blue Stone August 13–14. Movement to Washington, D.C., August 15–24. Maryland Campaign September 6–22. Battles of Frederick City, Md., September 12. South Mountain September 14. Antietam September 16–17. March to Clear Springs October 8, then to Hancock October 9. March to the Kanawha Valley, West Va., October 14-November 17. Duty at Brownstown November 17, 1862, to January 8, 1863. Scout to Boone, Wyoming and Logan Counties December 1–10, 1862. Moved to Buckhannon January 8, 1863, then to Clarksburg April 26–27, and to Weston May 9–12. Moved to New Creek June 17, thence to Beverly July 2–7, and duty there until November 1. Averill's Raid from Beverly against Lewisburg and the Virginia & Tennessee Railroad November 1–17. Mill Point November 5. Droop Mountain November 6. Elk Mountain hear Hillsborough November 10. March through Elk Mountain Pass to Beverly December 13–17, and duty at Beverly until April 23, 1864. Moved to join Army of the Shenandoah at Bunker Hill April 23–29. Sigel's Expedition to New Market April 30-May 16. Near Strasburg May 15. Battle of New Market May 16. Hunter's Expedition to Lynchburg, Va., May 26-June 8. Piedmont June 5. Occupation of Staunton June 6. March to Webster on the Baltimore & Ohio Railroad with 1,000 prisoners, wounded and refugees, June 8–18. Guard prisoners to Camp Morton, Ind., thence moved to Cincinnati, Ohio. Reorganized as a veteran battalion September 1864, and ordered to Wheeling, W. Va.

== Casualties ==
The regiment lost a total of 134 men during service; 2 officers and 66 enlisted men killed or mortally wounded, 66 enlisted men died of disease.

== Commanders ==
- Colonel August Moor - captured at Frederick, Maryland, on September 12, 1862; afterward commanded a brigade at the battles of New Market and Piedmont. Moor commanded all infantry at Droop Mountain.
- Lieutenant Colonel Gottfried Becker - commanded at the battles of South Mountain, Antietam, Droop Mountain, New Market, and Piedmont

== See also ==
- List of Ohio Civil War units
- Ohio in the Civil War
- Catherine E. Davidson
