= Florence Stockade =

Coordinates: 34°10′23″N 79°44′46″W

- U.S. National Register of Historic Places
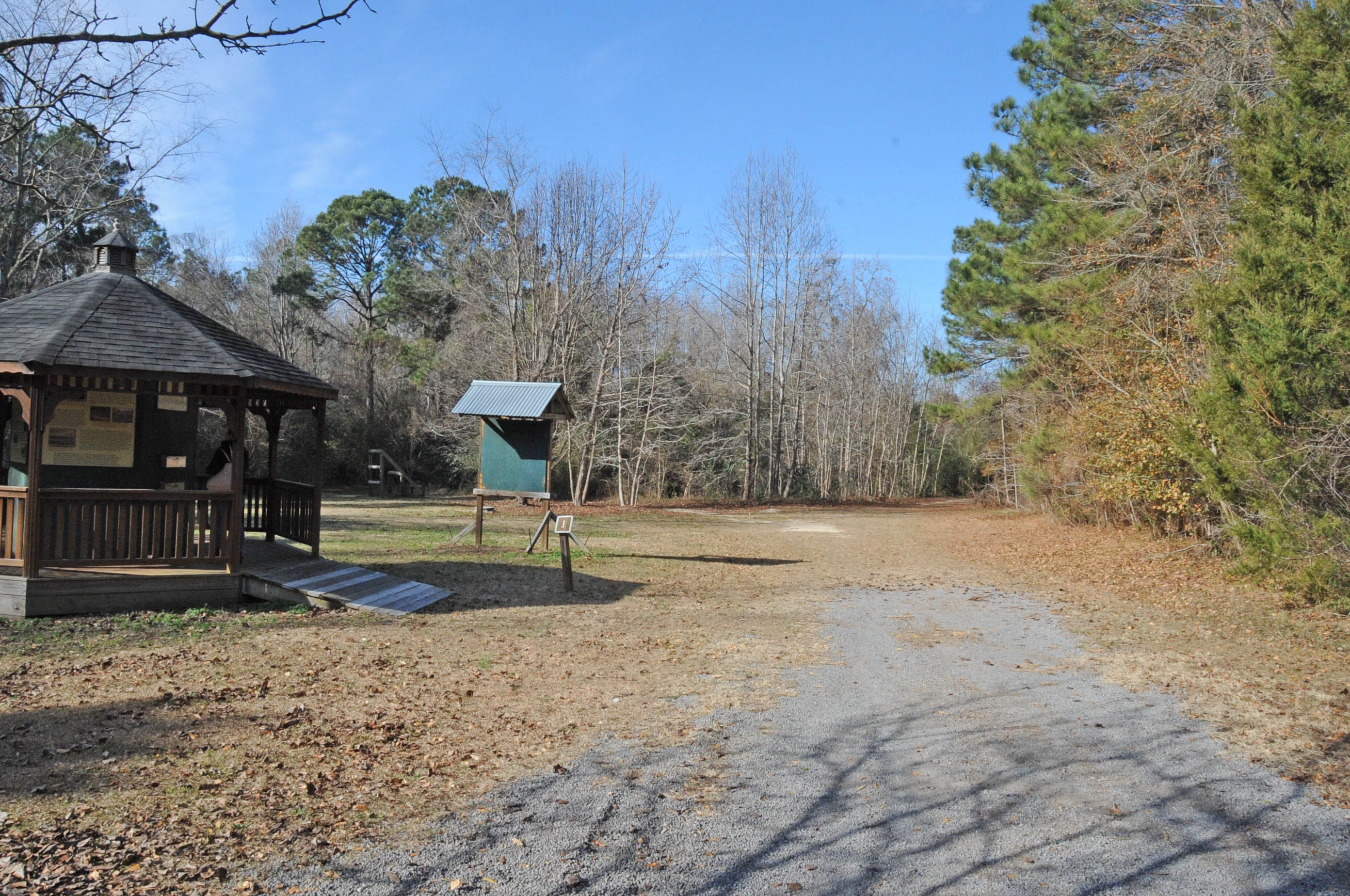
- Site of the stockade

- Location within South Carolina Location within the United States
- Nearest city: Florence, South Carolina, United States
- Built: 1864
- Architect: Confederate Army
- NRHP reference No.: 80003669
- Added to NRHP: November 28, 1980

Florence Stockade Prison
- Part of American Civil War prison camps
- Florence, South Carolina, US
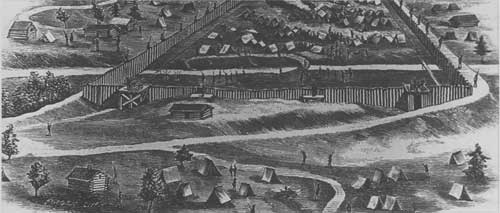

Site information
- Type: Confederate Prison Camp
- Owner: Confederate States Government
- Controlled by: Confederate Army
- Open to the public: Yes

Site history
- In use: September 1864-February 1865
- Demolished: 1865?
- Battles/wars: American Civil War

Garrison information
- Occupants: Confederate soldiers, Union prisoners of war

The Florence Stockade, also known as The Stockade or the Confederate States Military Prison at Florence, was a Confederate prisoner-of-war camp located on the outskirts of Florence, South Carolina, during the American Civil War. It operated from September 1864 through February 1865; during this time, as many as 18,000 Union soldiers were imprisoned there, about 2,800 of whom died.

== History ==
The Florence Stockade was built and became operational in September 1864, and was in operation during the final fall and winter of the war. Overall in command was Lt. Col. John Iverson, of the 5th Georgia Infantry but the officer in charge of the stockade (a position comparable to that of Henry Wirz at Andersonville Prison) was Lt. James Barrett, also of the 5th Georgia. During its time of operation, anywhere from 15,000 to 18,000 captives were held there. The need for additional prisons became imperative after General Sherman captured Atlanta on September 1, 1864. Andersonville prison in south Georgia was thought to be in the path of Sherman and the Confederate prison authorities determined to relocate the approximately 30,000 Union prisoners then at Andersonville. Because Florence had three railroads, and was thought to be secure, it was chosen as a site for a newly constructed prison. To keep the Union soldiers in order during relocation, they were told that they were to be paroled. Many of those who were unable to walk or not stable enough to travel were left behind in Andersonville. Most of the prisoners who initially came to Florence were first transported to Charleston before making their way 90 miles inland to Florence. The Florence Stockade was still under construction when the first several thousand prisoners arrived.

The Florence Stockade covered 23.5 acres (95,000 m^{2}) of land with a trench dug out around the outside to prevent prisoners from tunnelling out. After about a month of operation, there were about 12,000 prisoners and a death rate of 20 to 30 per day. Supplies were scarce for both the prisoners and the guards. Men were sleeping almost naked and with no blankets. In his 1879 book Andersonville: a Story of Rebel Military Prisons, John McElroy, who was imprisoned in both, states, "I think also that all who experienced confinement in the two places are united in pronouncing Florence to be, on the whole, much the worse place and more fatal to life." He states that government records suggest that about one man in each three imprisoned there died. Part of the reason for this is that its prisoners had already been weakened by their stay in the infamous Andersonville Prison. McElroy, Sgt. Robert H. Kellogg of the 16th Connecticut Volunteers, and Sgt. S.S. Boggs of the 21st Illinois have written similar accounts of Barrett's cruel, inhumane behavior and murders of prisoners.

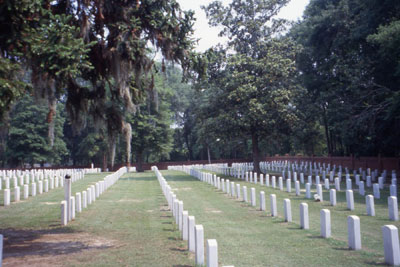
2,802 Union soldiers in unmarked graves are in the Florence National Cemetery

In mid-October, the United States Sanitary Commission delivered supplies. Of the total number of prisoners that passed through the Florence Stockade, 2,802 Union soldiers died there and most were buried in unmarked trenches in what would become the Florence National Cemetery after the war.

The Stockade was listed on the National Register of Historic Places in 1980.

The site is open to the public and is a component of the City of Florence Trail System. The City of Florence and the Friends of the Florence Stockade have developed a walking tour of the site. There is also an informational gazebo on-site containing a permanent display detailing the history of the site.

== See also ==
- List of Civil War POW prisons and camps
