= Mary Owens (soldier) =

American soldier and crossdresser

Mary Owens (c. 1843–1881) claimed to have served in disguise as a male Union soldier during the American Civil War.

== Claims of Civil War service ==
Mary Owens' story is detailed only in newspaper accounts and is presented as originally described here:

Born in Wales, Mary immigrated to Pennsylvania with her parents. She left home, eloping with William Evans, a man disliked by her parents, and married in Montour County, Pennsylvania. Shortly after the beginning of the Civil War, the couple enlisted together in Company K, 9th Cavalry, Mary posing as her husband's brother, "John Evans." Her husband died by her side in combat; she remained in the regiment eighteen months despite his death.

Owens fought in three battles with her regiment, and was wounded in each. She dressed her first wounds herself, being wounded above her right eye and on her arm, fearing to be revealed if she went to a hospital. These were likely wounds from an enemy saber.She was discovered after 18 months of service upon being wounded in battle for the third time, in the chest.

Local newspapers during the war delighted in stories such as Owens's, involving women soldiers inspired by patriotism or the love of their husbands. According to Frank Leslie's Illustrated Newspaper, Owens was "described as a woman of considerable beauty, and is said to be the heroine of the neighborhood."

Mary Owens remarried to Abraham Jenkins, also a native of Wales. They moved to Ohio, living first in Youngstown then in Stark County. She and Abraham had four children. She died in 1881 and was buried in West Brookfield, Ohio. Abraham died in a railroad accident in 1903. The local chapter of the Grand Army of the Republic decorated her grave for many years after her death. A headstone was added by the Sons of Union Veterans in 1937 which proclaimed her service to the Union army.

The District of Columbia Press, in the post-war years, was interested in preserving the tales of women soldiers. They published pieces about Mary Owens in 1896 and 1901.

== See also ==
- List of female American Civil War soldiers
