= 90th Illinois Infantry Regiment =

90th Regiment Illinois Volunteer Infantry "The Irish Legion"
- Illinois state flag
- Active: September 7, 1862, to June 10, 1865
- Country: United States
- Allegiance: Union
- Branch: Infantry
- Engagements: Siege of Vicksburg; Battle of Missionary Ridge; Battle of Resaca; Battle of Kennesaw Mountain; Battle of Jonesborough; March to the Sea; Battle of Bentonville

The 90th Regiment Illinois Volunteer Infantry was an infantry regiment that served in the Union Army during the American Civil War.

== Service ==
The 90th Illinois Infantry was organized at Chicago, Illinois and mustered into Federal service on September 7, 1862. Nicknamed the "Irish Legion" or the "Second Irish". On two occasions, the unit included a disguised woman (Frances Elizabeth Quinn) in its ranks. The first time she was discovered and dismissed within a month by Colonel Tomothy O'Meara. She rejoined under a different name, and a new commander, a year later. She was successful until captured and discovered by confederate soldiers.

A captain in the 90th Illinois Infantry named Thomas K. Barrett was presented a US M1850 foot officer's sword by the citizens of Ottawa as a Token of their esteem and appreciation at camp Dunne Illinois, September 4th, 1862. the sword had the following inscription on its scabbard: "Presented by the citizens of Ottawa. Capt. Thomas K. Barrett as a token of their esteem and appreciation at camp Dunne Illinois September 4th 1862"

The regiment was mustered out on June 10, 1865.

== Total strength and casualties ==
The regiment suffered 2 officers and 58 enlisted men who were killed in action or who died of their wounds and 1 officer and 87 enlisted men who died of disease, for a total of 148 fatalities.

== Commanders ==
- Colonel Timothy O'Meara - killed in action at the Battle of Missionary Ridge.
- Lieutenant Colonel Owen Stewart - Mustered out with the regiment.

== See also ==
- List of Illinois Civil War Units
- Illinois in the American Civil War
