= Loreta Janeta Velázquez =

Cuban American Civil War spy (1842–1923)

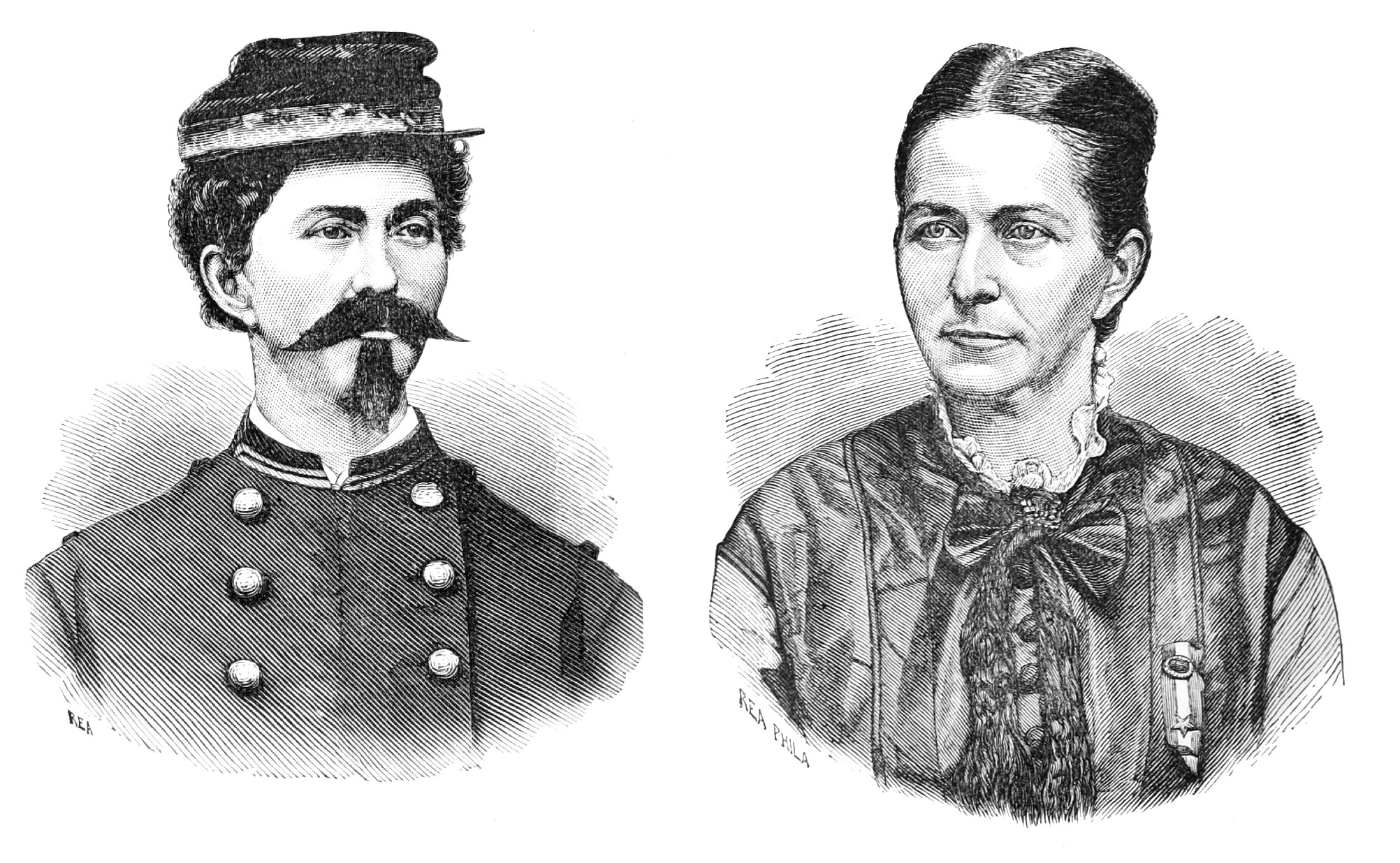
- Velázquez as herself (right) and disguised as "Lieutenant Harry T. Buford" (left)
- Born: c.1842
- Died: 1923
- Military career
- Allegiance: Confederate States of America
- Branch: Confederate States Army
- Service years: 1861–1865
- Rank: Second Lieutenant
- Nickname: Lieutenant Harry T. Buford
- Conflicts: American Civil War; First Battle of Bull Run; Battle of Fort Donelson; Battle of Shiloh

Loreta Janeta Velázquez (c.1842 – 1923) was an American woman who wrote that she had masqueraded as a male Confederate soldier during the American Civil War. The book she wrote about her experiences says that after her soldier husband's accidental death, she enlisted in the Confederate States Army in 1861. She then fought at Bull Run, Ball's Bluff, and Fort Donelson, but was discharged when her sex was discovered while in New Orleans. Undeterred, she reenlisted and fought at Shiloh, until unmasked once more. She then became a Confederate spy, working in both male and female guises, and as a double agent also reporting to the U.S. Secret Service. She remarried three more times, being widowed in each instance.

According to historian William C. Davis, she died in January 1923 under the name Loretta J. Beard after many years away from the public eye in a public psychiatric facility, St. Elizabeths Hospital. Most of her claims are not supportable with actual documents, and many are contradictable by actual documentation.

== The Woman in Battle ==
Velázquez recorded her adventures in her 600-page book, The Woman in Battle: A Narrative of the Exploits, Adventures, and travels of Madame Loreta Janeta Velázquez, Otherwise Known as Lieutenant Harry T. Buford, Confederate States Army (1876) to support her son. The Confederate general Jubal Early refused to accept her memoirs as fact, and modern scholars have cast doubt upon the veracity of the book's report.

=== Birth and family ===
According to her book, Loreta Janeta Velázquez was born in Havana, Cuba, on June 26, 1842, to a wealthy Cuban official and a mother of French and American ancestry. She also used the name Alice Williams. According to her own account, Velázquez was of Castilian descent and related to Cuban governor Diego Velázquez de Cuéllar and artist Diego Velázquez.

Her father was a Spanish government official who owned plantations in Mexico and Cuba. He felt a deep resentment towards the United States after losing an inherited ranch in the Mexican–American War at San Luis Potosi. This animosity perpetuated the estrangement between Velázquez and her father after her elopement with an American soldier.

Velázquez learned the English language at school in New Orleans in 1849, while living with an aunt. Her father's wealth as a plantation owner allowed her this opportunity to travel and continue her education. While in New Orleans, Velázquez took to fairy tales and stories of heroism, citing Joan of Arc as a particular inspiration.

Velázquez was engaged young to Raphael, a Spaniard, in what she referred to in her memoir as a "marriage of convenience." At fourteen years old, she eloped with a Texas United States Army officer known only as John Williams (also often referred to in various sources as simply "William") on April 5, 1856, despite the threats to be sent to a convent or back to Cuba from her family. Her decision to elope was poorly received by her family, causing their estrangement. She initially continued to live with her aunt, but after a quarrel with her she moved in with her husband and lived at various army posts, estranging herself further from her family by converting to Methodism.

=== American Civil War ===
At the outbreak of the American Civil War, Velázquez says that her husband resigned his U.S. commission and joined the Confederate Army. The couple became more interested in the Civil War after the early deaths of three of their children. At first, Williams actually aided Velázquez in her endeavors to cross-dress and to enlist. He agreed to a night out together with Velázquez disguised as a man, assured that upon seeing the behavior of other men she would be dissuaded. Velázquez's desires to enlist, however, were only strengthened. Velázquez failed to convince her husband to let her join him, so she acquired two uniforms, adopted the name Harry T. Buford and moved to Arkansas. There she recruited 236 men in four days, shipped them to Pensacola, Florida, and presented them to her husband as her command. Her husband died soon after in an accident while he was demonstrating the use of weapons to his troops. Velázquez turned her men over to a friend and began to search for more things to do.

Her first experience in combat was as an independent soldier in the First Battle of Bull Run. She eventually grew tired of camp life, however, and again donned female garb to go to Washington, D.C., where she spied for the Confederacy. She reported that she had met Abraham Lincoln and Secretary of War Simon Cameron on this excursion. When she returned to the South, she was assigned to the detective corps. She later left for Tennessee.

In Tennessee, she fought in the siege of Fort Donelson until the surrender. She was wounded in battle, but was not exposed. She fled to New Orleans, where she was arrested, suspected of being a female Union spy in disguise. After she was released, she enlisted to get away from the city.

At Shiloh, she found the battalion she had raised in Arkansas and fought in the battle. As she was burying the dead after a battle, a stray shell wounded her. When the army doctor who examined her discovered she was a woman, she again fled to New Orleans and saw Major General Benjamin F. Butler take command of the city. She gave up her uniform at that point.

Afterwards, in Richmond, Virginia, authorities again hired her as a spy and she began to travel all around the US. At that time, she married a Captain Thomas DeCaulp; he reportedly died soon after in a Chattanooga hospital. (An officer of that name is known to have survived the war.)

She then traveled north where officials hired her to search for herself. In Ohio and Indiana, she tried to organize a rebellion of Confederate prisoners of war.

=== Travels ===
After the war, Velázquez traveled in Europe with her brother, as well as throughout South America and the southern United States. She married Major Wasson and emigrated with him to Venezuela. When he died in Caracas, she returned to the United States. During her subsequent travels around the U.S., she gave birth to a baby boy and met Brigham Young in Utah. She arrived in Omaha, almost penniless, but charmed General W. S. Harney into giving her blankets and a revolver. Two days after her arrival in the mining area of Nevada, she received a proposal of marriage from a sixty-year-old man, which she refused. After eventually marrying a younger man, whose name is not known, Velázquez soon left Nevada, travelling with her baby. After encountering the miners, in 1868, she encountered Mormons as well, however, she was not impressed with these pioneers. Wanting to return to civilization, she goes to Texas, where her story fades into obscurity.

== Reception of her book ==
Her book appeared in print in 1876. In the preface, Velázquez stated that she had written the book primarily for money so she could support her child, perhaps to combat the notion of her profiting from the war. The veracity of the account was attacked almost immediately, and remains an issue with scholars. Some opine it is probably entirely fiction, others that the details in the text show a familiarity with the times that would be difficult to completely simulate.

Shortly after its appearance, former Confederate General Jubal Early denounced the book as an obvious fiction.

In 2007, The History Channel aired Full Metal Corset, a program that presented details of Velázquez's story as genuine. However, the overall truthfulness of her account remains indeterminate and highly questionable.

In 2013, Rebel-Loreta Velazquez: Secret Soldier of the American Civil War, directed by María Aguí Carter, was released which presented Velázquez's story as genuine based on Velázquez's memoir with Loreta speaking in the documentary as first-person narrator. The documentary includes interviews with multiple academic scholars. DeAnne Blanton, Senior Military Analyst, National Archives, states in the documentary that her memoir "took her life story and made it a little better." Blanton and other scholars address the claim of former Confederate General Jubal Early that the book is a fiction but indicate that they largely believe Velázquez. "We can corroborate quite a bit of what she writes in her book" states Blanton of the National Archives. The documentary was released by PBS.

== Career after the war ==
She became very active in public life and politics, and was particularly involved in grand speculative schemes around mining and railway building, as well as being involved in journalism and writing. Her biographer William C. Davis suggests that her actions were generally fraudulent, intending to raise money for herself and associates.

Some press accounts were impressed by her vitality and business acumen, such as in an 1891 account from the New York Herald reprinted in the Saturday Evening Mail of Terre Haute. Velázquez was described there as "a woman of business, a woman who can 'run things like a man'."

== Death ==
Loreta Janeta Velázquez is said to have died in 1923, but historian Richard Hall states that her death is unknown and the place and date of her death are also unknown. Hall, in Patriots in Disguise, takes a hard look at The Woman in Battle and analyzes whether it is accurate or fictionalized. Historian Elizabeth Leonard, in All the Daring of the Soldier (1999), assesses The Woman in Battle as largely fiction, but based on real experience. A newspaper report mentions a Lieutenant Bensford arrested when it was disclosed that "he" was actually a woman, and gives her name as Alice Williams, a name that Loreta Velázquez apparently also used.

== Revisionist biography ==
In October 2016, historian William C. Davis published a biography of Velázquez titled Inventing Loreta Velásquez: Confederate Soldier Impersonator, Media Celebrity, and Con Artist. This account was based on newspaper and archival research, and came to the conclusion that the whole of The Woman in Battle is fiction. Davis asserted that Velázquez was neither Cuban nor a Confederate soldier, but "a thief" and a "prostitute", possibly born in New York, and eventually a "swindler" and "con artist". Velázquez used many aliases, according to Davis, while he was uncertain of her actual name, age, and place of birth, and thus unable to determine her family, background, or ethnicity. The woman he ultimately identified as Velázquez served terms in jail for theft and other minor offenses, and subsequently invented glamorous stories about her origin, having learned to lie while working as a prostitute.

Davis's work viewed his subject in a negative light, expressing also doubt whether women ever served effectively in the Civil War, detailing specific doubts about Velázquez's service. Davis does, however, provide a definite date for her death as "Loretta J. Beard" on January 26, 1923, at the St. Elizabeths Hospital for the Insane, Washington. In the final chapter, Davis critiqued feminist and Hispanic historiographical approaches to Velazquez, as well as postmodern literary theory, all of which, he said, have failed to accurately evaluate Velázquez's claims and thus "perpetuated" her lies to promote their own agendas.

== In popular culture ==
María Aguí Carter directed Rebel, an investigative documentary, examining the story of Loreta Velázquez. The film is a detective story exploring Velázquez's report and the politics involved in erasing her from history. It was produced in 2013 and has a run-time of 73 minutes.

== See also ==
- Hispanics in the American Civil War
- List of female American Civil War soldiers
- List of wartime cross-dressers
- Timeline of women in war in the United States, pre-1945

== Bibliography ==
Books

- Blanton, DeAnne, and Lauren M. Cook. They Fought Like Demons. Baton Rouge: LSU Press, 2002. ISBN 0807128066
- Cumming, Carman. Devil's Game: The Civil War Intrigues of Charles A. Dunham. Urbana: U. of Illinois Press, 2004. ISBN 0252028902
- Davis, William C. Inventing Loreta Velasquez: Confederate Soldier Impersonator, Media Celebrity, and Con Artist. Southern Illinois University Press, 2016. ISBN 0809335220
- Hall, Richard. Patriots in Disguise: Women Warriors of the Civil War. N.Y.: Marlowe & Co., 1994. ISBN 1557784388
- Leonard, Elizabeth. All the Daring of the Soldier: Women of the Civil War Armies. N.Y.: Norton, 1999. ISBN 0393047121
- Velazquez, Loreta Janeta. The Woman in Battle: A Narrative of the Exploits, Adventures and travels of Madame Loreta Janeta Velazquez, Otherwise Known as Lieutenant Harry J. Buford, Confederate States Army (1876) Reprinted in 1972 by the Arno Press. ISBN 0405044852 Reprinted in 2003 by University of Wisconsin. ISBN 0299194205
- Young, Elizabeth. Disarming the Nation: Women's Writing and the American Civil War. Chicago: U. of Chicago Press, 1999. ISBN 0226960870

TV programs

- Full Metal Corset: Secret Soldiers of the Civil War, The History Channel, 2007
- REBEL, 2013, PBS home video
