= Florence National Cemetery =

Historic veterans cemetery in Florence County, South Carolina

- U.S. National Register of Historic Places
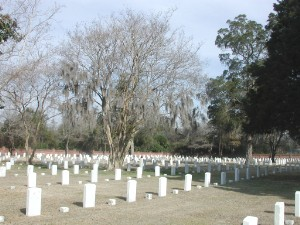
- Graves in the cemetery

- Location within South Carolina Location within the United States
- Location: 803 E. National Cemetery Rd., Florence, South Carolina
- Coordinates: 34°11′05″N 79°45′15″W
- Area: 10.4 acres (4.2 ha)
- Built: 1872
- MPS: Civil War Era National Cemeteries MPS
- NRHP reference No.: 97001207
- Added to NRHP: January 5, 1998

Florence National Cemetery is a United States National Cemetery located in the city of Florence, South Carolina. Administered by the United States Department of Veterans Affairs, it encompasses 24.9 acres (10.1 ha), and as of 2021, had over 12,000 interments.

== History ==
The cemetery was originally created on land appropriated, and later purchased, by the federal government. The land was first owned by James H. Jarrott and was a quarter of a mile from the Florence Stockade. It became a National Cemetery in 1865, and remains from nearby Civil War battlefield cemeteries were transferred and reinterred there.

Florence National Cemetery was listed in the National Register of Historic Places in 1998.

== Notable interments ==
- Florena Budwin, a woman who donned a Union uniform and pretended to be a man so she could serve alongside her husband, who was a Captain, in the Civil War. Her husband was killed and she was captured by the Confederate forces, and served as a nurse at the Florence prisoner of war camp until her death.
- Boatswain's Mate First Class James Elliott Williams, Medal of Honor recipient for action in the Vietnam War.
