= 7th Michigan Cavalry Regiment =

- Michigan state flag
- Active: October 1862 to December 15, 1865
- Country: United States
- Allegiance: Union
- Branch: Cavalry
- Engagements: Battle of Gettysburg; Kilpatrick's Raid on Richmond; Battle of the Wilderness; Battle of Yellow Tavern; Battle of Cedar Creek; Battle of Five Forks; Appomattox

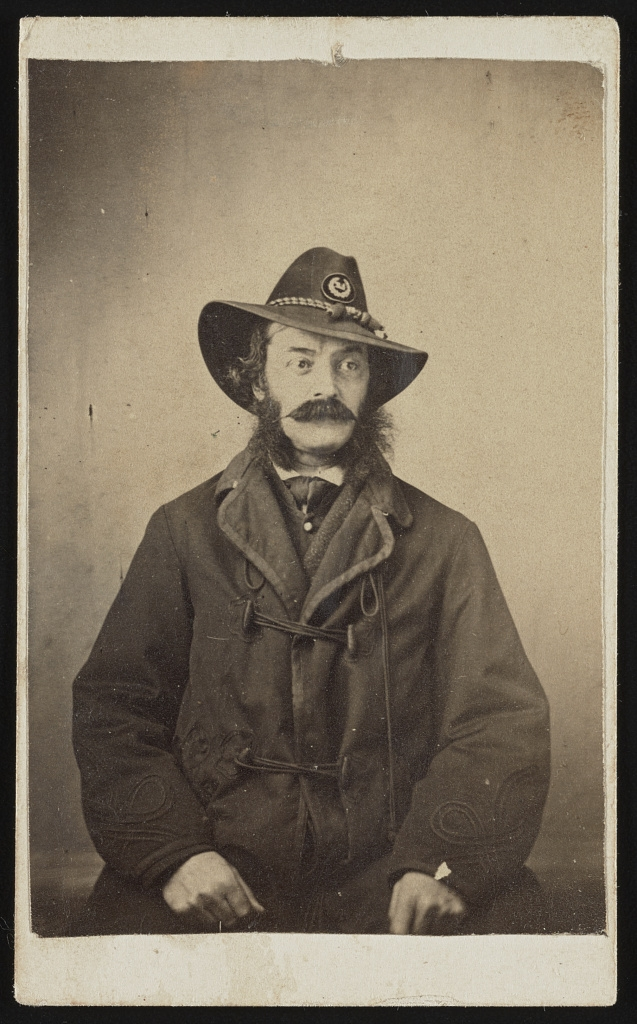
Capt. George A. Armstrong of Co. D, 7th Michigan Cavalry

The 7th Michigan Cavalry Regiment was a cavalry regiment that served in the Union Army during the American Civil War. It was a part of the famed Michigan Brigade, commanded for a time by Brigadier General George Armstrong Custer.

== Service ==
The 7th Michigan Cavalry was organized at Grand Rapids, Michigan, in October 1862 by William d'Alton Mann, a future prominent Michigan newspaper and magazine publisher. He was later named as the regiment's colonel.

The regiment was assigned to what became the Michigan Brigade during the early part of the Gettysburg campaign in June 1863. It saw its first actions under General Custer at the Hanover, Hunterstown, and Gettysburg. Armed with Spencer Repeating Rifles, the 7th used superior firepower to best the Confederate cavalry.

The regiment was mustered out of service on December 15, 1865.

== Total strength and casualties ==
The regiment suffered 4 officers and 81 enlisted men killed in action or mortally wounded and 2 officers and 256 enlisted men who died of disease, for a total of 343 fatalities.

== Commanders ==
- Colonel William d'Alton Mann
- Colonel Allyne C. Litchfield

== Notable members ==
- Private Abram Halstead Ellis, Company C – justice of the Kansas Supreme Court, (1901–1902)
- First Sergeant Charles M. Holton, Company – Medal of Honor recipient

== See also ==
- List of Michigan Civil War Units
- Michigan in the American Civil War
- Mary Burns (US Civil War soldier)
