= Castle Thunder (prison) =

Prison in Richmond, Virginia, US

Coordinates: 37°31′56″N 77°25′41″W

Castle Thunder Prison
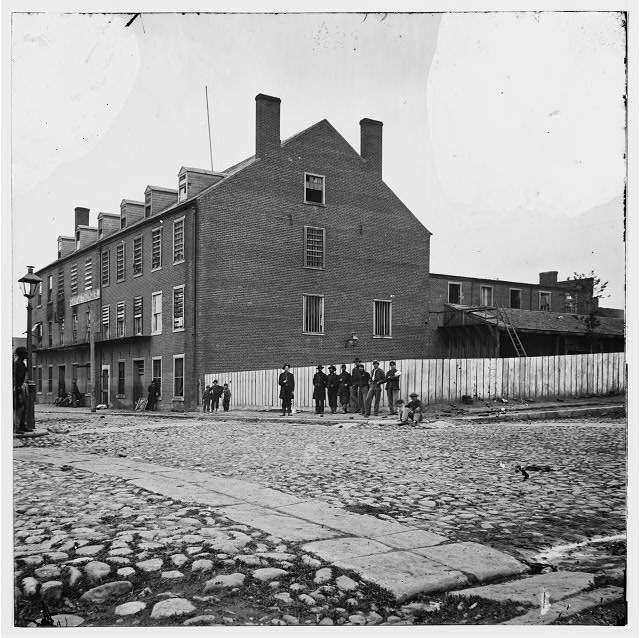
- Castle Thunder Prison was in Richmond, Virginia, a former tobacco warehouse, located on Tobacco Row
- Interactive map of Castle Thunder Prison
- Location: Between 18th Street and 19th Street on E Cary Street in Richmond, Virginia, was a former tobacco warehouse, located on Tobacco Row
- Opened: 1861
- Closed: 1865
- Managed by: Confederate States of America

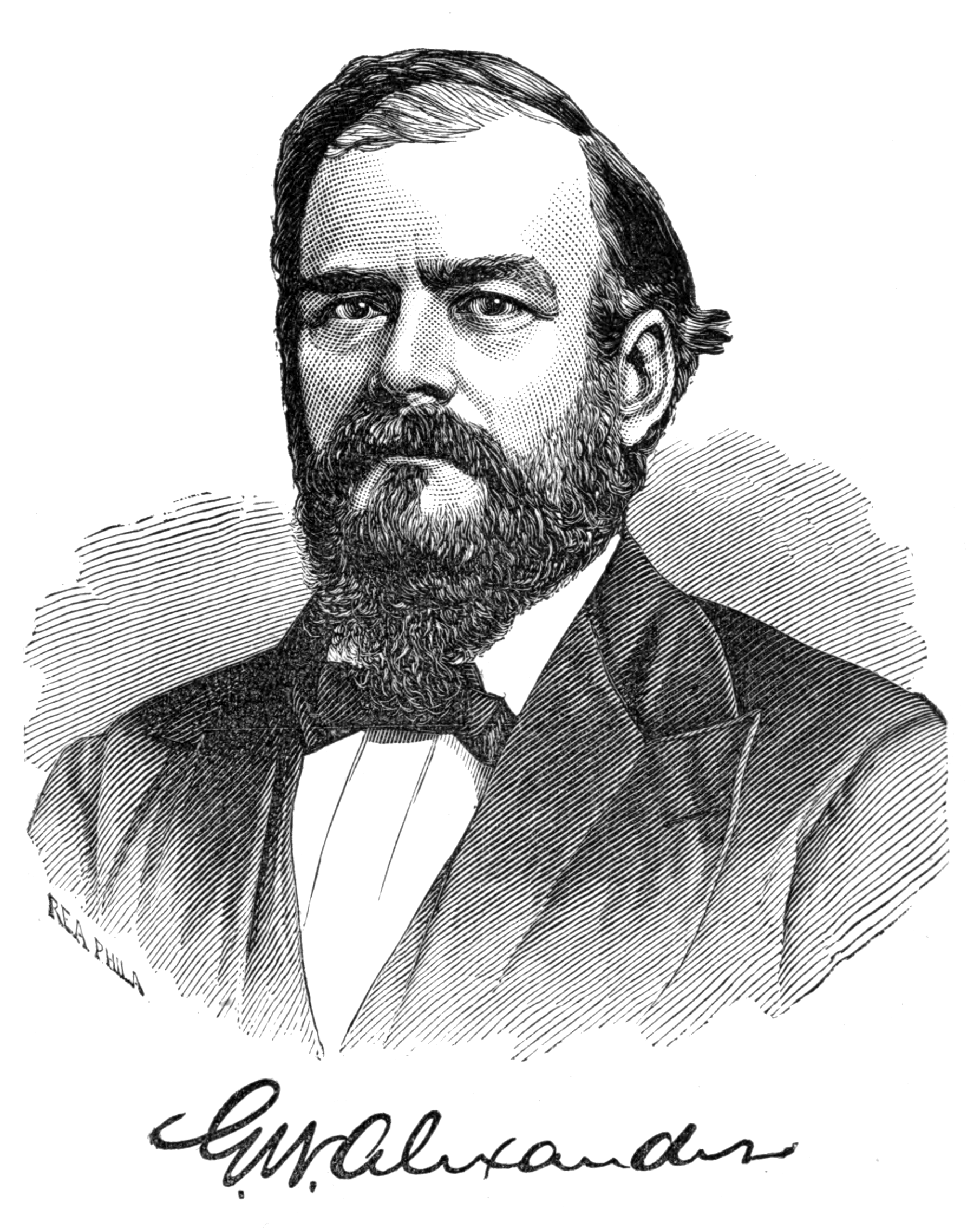
Commandant George W. Alexander

Castle Thunder, located between what is now 18th Street and 19th Street on northern side of E Cary Street in Richmond, Virginia, was a former tobacco warehouse in three buildings, located on Tobacco Row, converted into a prison pursuant to an order of Richmond's provost-marshal John Winder by August 1862. The Confederacy there housed civilian prisoners, including captured Union spies and deserters, political prisoners and those charged with treason during the American Civil War.

President Jefferson Davis is reported to have said that for every Confederate sailor hanged he would hang a Union soldier of corresponding rank, chosen by lot from among the thousands of prisoners in the Richmond tobacco warehouse. Indeed, many inmates were sentenced to death. Moreover, the prison guards had a reputation for brutality, though the inmates were sometimes allowed boxes of medicine and other supplies.

The prison's most notorious commandant was Captain George W. Alexander, who commanded Castle Thunder from October 1862 until removed in February 1864 after an investigation by the Confederate House of Representatives, which nominally cleared him. As a Confederate soldier fighting in Maryland, Alexander had been captured by Union Army troops in 1861. While awaiting execution, he escaped and fled to Richmond. There, Alexander took command of the Castle Thunder Prison, which had nominal a capacity of 1,400 inmates, although by January 1863 it had more than 3000 inmates. Security at the prison was intense under Alexander, and diseases including smallpox and dysentery were rampant. Prisoners complained of Alexander's brutality and that of his guards, particularly excessive lashings and use of his large dog Nero to intimidate them. Alexander defended his discipline by citing the hard-bitten character of the inmates.

Among its many notable occupants was Union officer William Jackson Palmer (1836–1909). In 1862, he was captured while scouting after the Battle of Antietam within Confederate lines in civilian clothes while gathering information for General George McClellan. When questioned he gave his name as W.J. Peters and claimed to be a mine owner on an inspection trip. While the Confederates did not know he was a spy, his circumstances were suspicious and he was detained and sent to Richmond, Virginia, for detention at Castle Thunder. He was set free in a prisoner exchange and rejoined his regiment in February 1863.

About 100 women were imprisoned at Castle Thunder, since the also-notorious Libby Prison housed only men. Perhaps the most famous imprisoned woman was Dr. Mary E. Walker, a Union surgeon at Chatham Manor in Fredericksburg since the 1862 Battle of Fredericksburg, whom Confederate pickets arrested as a spy in April 1864 and who was imprisoned until a prisoner exchange on August 12, 1864. Although Walker reassured her mother in a letter from prison that she had a clean bed and adequate food, she weighed only 60 pounds on her release from Castle Thunder. Following the conflict, Walker received the Medal of Honor, the only woman to receive that distinction.

Some prisoners were transferred from Castle Thunder to Danville after the end of the siege of Petersburg, Virginia in March 1865 (Petersburg also had a prison of the same name but less notoriety). After Union forces captured Richmond in April 1865, they used the prison for those accused of unruly conduct and similar purposes. Although Mollie Bean had pretended to be a man to enlist in the Confederate Army, and served for two years in the 47th North Carolina (including twice wounded in action), her Union captors suspected her of being a spy.

After the end of military rule, the property was returned to its owners. However, in 1879, a fire destroyed the warehouse and Civil War–era prison Castle Thunder in its entirety.
