= Fanny Wilson (U.S. Civil War) =

Fanny (Fannie) Wilson, disguised as a man, enlisted as a soldier in the Union Army during the U.S. Civil War with her close friend Nellie Graves. At the time, women were not allowed to serve in the Union Army so Wilson and Graves had to masquerade as men.

== Pre-Civil War ==
Born in Long Island, New York, Wilson fell in love with and became engaged to a man before taking a trip to Lafayette, Indiana to visit some relatives in 1860. Her friend, Graves, accompanied her on this trip. Both were deeply in love with men they had left back home.

In early 1861, as America moved closer to Civil War Wilson and Graves returned home to Long Island. During the trip home, they thought of a plan to stay close to their lovers if war should occur, since both men had stated they would join the Union Army should war break out. They intended to enlist in the same regiment as their men, but in different companies. This would lessen their risk of discovery, while still being close to their lovers.

== Civil War ==
In 1862, the two men enlisted in the new regiment being formed at Camp Cadwallader, in Beverly, New Jersey. The 24th New Jersey Infantry Regiment was mustered into Federal service on September 16, 1862. Wilson and Graves enacted their plan. They cut their hair and put on men's clothing. Graves had a more difficult time concealing her sex than Wilson did. Wilson was described as having a "... masculine voice" and as "tanned and smart and somewhat educated." She was nineteen at the time.

Their plan worked, they marched and trained alongside their lovers without being discovered. They served in the defense of Washington, D.C., until December 1862 when the regiment was sent to Fredericksburg, Virginia, where they participated in the Battle of Fredericksburg. After seeing the horrors of war firsthand, both women viewed their service in a more serious light. They were determined to continue serving, not because of their lovers, but because they felt a need to serve their country.

In early May 1863, the regiment fought in the Battle of Chancellorsville. During the battle, Wilson's lover was seriously wounded. After the battle, Wilson took care and watched over him, nearly revealing herself. Despite Wilson's effort, her lover died. At some point during this time, Graves' lover was also killed, however it is unknown when or where he died.

Soon after their lovers' deaths, Wilson and Graves contracted an 'unspecified' illness. Both were sent to an army hospital in Cairo, Illinois. While there Wilson and Graves' true sex was discovered. Graves recovered first and was discharged, parting ways with Wilson. After Wilson was discharged she became a ballet dancer with the Cairo Theater. After two performances she quit and looked for another regiment to join, feeling the need to serve her country. She joined the 3rd Illinois Cavalry as they were on their way to Vicksburg, Mississippi. During the second assault on Vicksburg on May 22 Wilson was wounded in battle, though not seriously. She was treated without her true sex being discovered. She fully recovered and continued on with the regiment.

On August 5, 1863, Wilson was riding through Memphis, Tennessee, with a fellow soldier when a guard stopped them. She was arrested on suspicion of being a woman in men's clothing and being a spy. While being questioned, she proved she was a Union soldier. Soon after, the authorities discharged her with female clothing and made her promise she would not disguise herself as a man again. Fanny died on September 15, 1864, of disease. She is buried in the Memphis Tennessee National Cemetery, grave 621 (reference: US National Cemetery Interment Control Forms).

== See also ==
- List of female American Civil War soldiers
