= List of Native American women of the United States =

This is a list of notable Native American women of the United States. It should contain only Native women of the United States and its territories, not First Nations women or Native women of Central and South America. Native American identity is a complex and contested issue. The Bureau of Indian Affairs defines Native American as having American Indian or Alaska Native ancestry.

Legally, being Native American is defined as being enrolled in a federally recognized tribe or Alaskan village. These entities establish their own membership rules, and they vary. Each must be understood independently.

Ethnologically, factors such as culture, history, language, religion, and familial kinships can influence Native American identity.

All individuals on this list should have Native American ancestry. Historical figures might predate tribal enrollment practices and may be included based on reliable sources that document ethnological tribal membership.

Any contemporary individuals should either be enrolled members of federally recognized tribes, or have cited Native American ancestry and be recognized as Native American by their respective tribes. Contemporary individuals who are not enrolled in a tribe but are documented as having tribal descent are listed as being "of descent" from a tribe.

== A ==
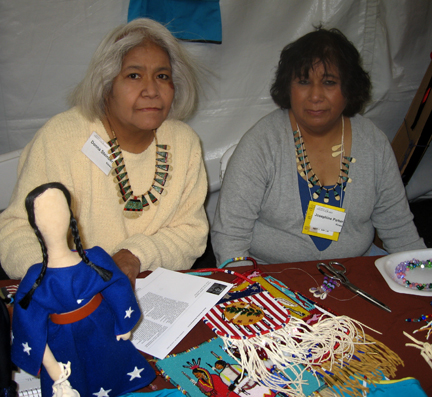
Donna Standing Steinberg, Kiowa-Wichita beadworker, and Josephine Parker, Kiowa, both from Oklahoma, 2007

- Louise Abeita (E-Yeh-Shure', Blue Corn) (born 1926), Isleta Pueblo author
- Alberta Schenck Adams (1928–2009), Iñupiaq civil rights activist
- Aguilar sisters, Kewa Pueblo potters
- Tahnee Ahtone, Kiowa/Muscogee/Seminole curator, museum professional, beadwork artist, textile artist
- Elsie Allen, Cloverdale Pomo basket weaver
- Paula Gunn Allen (1939–2008), Laguna Pueblo/Sioux/Lebanese poet, activist, literary critic, and novelist
- Tammie Allen (Walking Spirit), Jicarilla Apache, potter
- Queen Alliquippa (died 1754), Seneca Nation leader
- Lori Alvord, Navajo, first Navajo woman to be certified in surgery
- Princess Angeline (Suquamish/Duwamish, ca. 1820–1896), daughter of Chief Seattle
- Queen Ann (ca. 1650–ca. 1725), chief of the Pamunkey tribe
- Annie Antone, Tohono O'odham basket weaver
- Nicole Anunapu Mann, Round Valley Indian Tribes, astronaut
- Annette Arkeketa, Otoe-Missouria poet, playwright
- Tara Astigarraga, Choctaw Nation of Oklahoma, engineer, inventor
- Anna Mae Pictou Aquash (1945–1976), Mi'qmaq Indians rights activist
- Awashonks (fl. mid- to late 17th c.), chief of the Sakonett tribe
- Annette Arkeketa, Otoe-Missouria/Muscogee writer

== B ==
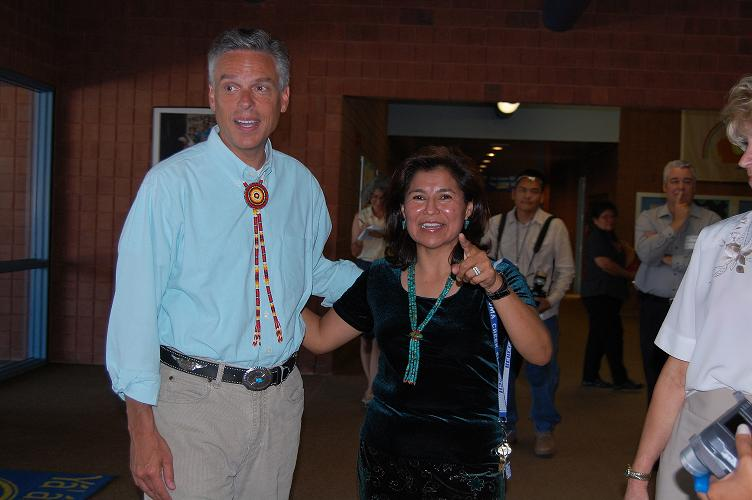
Rebecca Benally with former Utah Governor and former US Ambassador to China, Jon Huntsman Jr.

- Margarete Bagshaw (Santa Clara Pueblo-descent, born 1964), painter and gallerist
- Natalie Ball, Klamath/Modoc, born 1980, interdisciplinary artist
- Joyce Begay-Foss, Navajo textile weaver, educator, and curator
- Diane E. Benson (born 1954), Tlingit author
- Mary Knight Benson, Pomo basket weaver
- Martha Berry, Cherokee Nation bead artist and educator
- Peggy Berryhill, Muscogee broadcast journalist
- Carrie Bethel, Mono Lake Paiute basket weaver, 1898–1974
- Gloria Bird, Spokane Tribe of the Spokane Reservation poet and critic
- Mary Holiday Black (ca. 1934), Navajo basket maker and textile artist
- Black Buffalo Woman (Lakota), first wife of Crazy Horse
- Black Shawl (Lakota, died 1920), second wife of Crazy Horse
- Kimberley M. Blaeser (born 1955), White Earth Ojibwe writer
- Blue Corn (ca. 1920–1999), San Ildefonso Pueblo potter
- Rita Pitka Blumenstein (1936–2021), Yup'ik traditional healer, founding member of the International Council of Thirteen Indigenous Grandmothers
- Bowdash, Kootenai two-spirit warrior
- Beth Brant (born 1941), Bay of Quinte Mohawk
- Mary Brant, Mohawk leader
- Mary Brave Bird (1953–2013), Brulé Lakota writer and activist
- Bras Piqué, Natchez woman who tried to warn the French of her tribe's plans to attack them
- Ignatia Broker (1919–1987), Ojibwa writer
- Ticasuk Brown (1904–1982), Iñupiaq educator, poet and writer
- Vee F. Browne, Navajo author
- Buffalo Bird Woman, Hidatsa author
- Buffalo Calf Road Woman, Cheyenne cultural hero
- Olivia Ward Bush-Banks (Montaukett, 1869–1944) author, poet, and journalist of African-American and Native American descent

== C ==
- Sophia Alice Callahan (1868–1894) Muscogee novelist and teacher
- Caroline Cannon, Iñupiaq environmental activist, 2012 Goldman Environmental Prize winner, mayor of Point Hope, Alaska 1998–2001
- Gladys Cardiff (born 1942), poet and academic of Eastern Band Cherokee descent
- Poldine Carlo (1920–2018), Koyukon activist and writer
- Kathleen Carlo-Kendall, Koyukon artist, daughter of Poldine Carlo
- Tonantzin Carmelo, Tongva/Kumeyaay-descent actress
- Lorna Dee Cervantes (born 1954), Chicana/Chumash-descent
- Nellie Charlie (1867–1965) Mono Lake Paiute basketweaver
- Quannah Chasinghorse (born 2002), model and land protector
- Karletta Chief, Diné, hydrologist
- Marie Z. Chino, Acoma Pueblo potter
- Vera Chino, Acoma Pueblo potter
- Chipeta (1843/4–1924), Kiowa Apache, beadwork artist and wife of Chief Ouray
- Yvonne Chouteau (1929–2016), Shawnee Tribe ballerina
- Kelly Church, Gun Lake Potawatomi/Odawa/Ojibwe basket maker, birch bark biter, painter, and environmental activist
- Chrystos (born 1946), Menominee-descent two-spirit poet
- Mildred Cleghorn (Fort Sill Apache Tribe, 1910–1997), tribal chairperson, doll maker
- Elouise Cobell (Blackfeet), executive director of the Native American Community Development Corporation
- Radmilla Cody (Navajo/African American), Navajo language singer, 46th Miss Navajo Nation
- Colestah, Yakama, wife of Chief Kamiakin
- Lyda Conley (Wyandot, 1874–1946), first Native American female attorney, and first Native American woman admitted to argue a case before the U.S. Supreme Court. Wyandot Nation activist and attorney
- Elizabeth Cook-Lynn, Crow Creek Sioux poet and novelist
- Hilda Coriz, Kewa Pueblo potter
- Cuhtahlatah, 18th-century Cherokee heroine

== D ==
- Dahteste, Apache fighter and compatriot to Geronimo
- Carrie Dann, Western Shoshone activist
- Mary Dann (died 2005), Western Shoshone activist
- Nora Marks Dauenhauer (Tlingit, 1927–2017), poet and ethnolinguist
- Alice Brown Davis (Seminole Nation of Oklahoma, 1852–1935), Principal Chief
- Jenny L. Davis, Chickasaw author, linguist, and anthropologist
- Angel De Cora, Ho-Chunk artist and lecturer
- Ada Deer, Menominee author, activist, and the first Native American woman to head the Bureau of Indian Affairs
- Andrea Delgado-Olson, Ione Miwok, computer scientist
- Ella Cara Deloria (Yankton Dakota, 1888–1971), educator, anthropologist, ethnographer, linguist, and novelist
- Natalie Diaz (Mojave/Pima, born 1978), poet, language activist, former professional basketball player, and educator
- Mavis Doering, Cherokee Nation (1929–2007) basket weaver
- Do-Hum-Me, Sac entertainer
- Virginia Driving Hawk Sneve, Brulé Lakota writer and educator
- Juanita Suazo Dubray, Taos Pueblo potter
- Joyce Dugan (Eastern Band Cherokee), first female elected chief of the Eastern Band of Cherokee Indians

== E ==
- Eagle of Delight (Otoe, c. 1795–1822), emissary
- Chief Earth Woman, Ojibwa warrior
- Ehyophsta, Cheyenne warrior
- Heid E. Erdrich (Turtle Mountain Ojibweborn 1963), writer and editor of poetry, short stories, and nonfiction, and maker of poem films.
- Louise Erdrich (Turtle Mountain Ojibwe, born 1954), writer

== F ==
- Corine Fairbanks, Oglala Lakota author and activist
- Larissa FastHorse, Sicangu Lakota playwright and choreographer
- Fidelia Fielding (1827–1908), last native speaker of the Mohegan Pequot language
- Cecilia Fire Thunder (Oglala Lakota, born 1946), former president of the Oglala Sioux Tribe
- Te Ata Fisher (1895–1995), Chickasaw Nation storyteller and actress
- Elaine Fleming, Leech Lake Ojibwe mayor of Cass Lake, Minnesota
- Jennifer Foerster, Muscogee poet
- L. Frank, Tongva/Ajachmen Indian artist, tribal scholar, and activist
- Kalyn Free, Choctaw Nation of Oklahoma lawyer and activist

== G ==
- Nanibaa' Garrison, Navajo, bioethicist, geneticist, and academic
- Martha George (1892–1987), Suquamish tribal chairman
- Glory of the Morning (born 1709), Ho-Chunk chief
- Nicolle Gonzales (born 1980), Navajo certified midwife
- Rose Gonzales (ca. 1900–1989), Ohkay Owingeh Pueblo potter
- Shan Goshorn (Eastern Band Cherokee, 1957–2018), visual artist
- Katherine Gottlieb (born ca. 1952), Alutiiq health care executive and 2004 MacArthur Fellow
- Janice Gould, Koyangk'auwi Maidu writer
- Gouyen, Apache warrior
- Dorothy Grant, Alaska-born Haida fashion designer active in Canada
- Teri Greeves, Kiowa beadwork artist
- Linda LeGarde Grover (Bois Forte Chippewa), novelist and short story writer
- Juanita Growing Thunder Fogarty, Assiniboine/Sioux bead worker and quill worker
- Margaret Gutierrez, Santa Clara Pueblo potter

== H ==
- Janet Campbell Hale, Coeur d'Alene-Kootenay-Cree-Irish writer
- Hanging Cloud, Ojibwa warrior
- Helen Hardin, Tsa-Sah-Wee-Eh (1934–1984), Santa Clara Pueblo painter
- Joy Harjo, Muscogee poet, lecturer, and musician
- Suzan Shown Harjo, Southern Cheyenne/Muscogee activist
- LaDonna Harris, Comanche president of Americans for Indian Opportunity
- Ernestine Hayes (Tlingit, born 1945), memoirist
- Robbie Hedges, first elected woman chief of the Peoria tribe
- Rosella Hightower, Choctaw-Shawnee Tribe, born 1920, ballerina
- Joan Hill (Muscogee (Creek) Nation/Cherokee, 1930–2020), painter
- Linda Hogan (Chickasaw, born 1947), poet, storyteller, academic, playwright, novelist, environmentalist and writer of short stories.
- Minnie Hollow Wood, Lakota woman who fought at the Battle of Little Big Horn
- Hononegah (Ho-Chunk, ca. 1814–1847), pioneer
- Robbie E. Hood, Cherokee, atmospheric scientist
- LeAnne Howe, Choctaw Nation of Oklahoma writer
- Diane Humetewa, Hopi federal judge
- Pamela Rae Huteson (born 1957), Haida/Tlingit, born 1957) artist, disc jockey and writer

== I ==
- Debora Iyall (born 1954), Cowlitz-descent singer and printmaker

== J ==
- Sarah James (born 1946), Gwich'in environmental activist, 2002 Goldman Environmental Prize winner
- Jana (born 1980), Lumbee singer
- Viola Jimulla (1878–1966), Yavapai, chief of the Prescott Yavapai tribe
- Betty Mae Tiger Jumper (Florida Seminole, also known as Potackee (1923–2011), chairwoman, Florida Seminole Tribe (1967–1971), last matriarch of Snake Clan.
- Marie Smith Jones (1918–2008), Eyak activist and honorary chief, last known living speaker of the Eyak language
- Juana Maria (Nicoleño, died 1853), last member of her tribe

== K ==
- Yvonne Kauger (born 1937), Cheyenne-Arapaho Oklahoma Supreme Court justice
- Geraldine Keams (born 1951), Navajo Nation actress
- Adrienne Keene (born 1985), Cherokee Nation academic, writer, activist, and podcaster
- Maude Kegg (1906–1996), Ojibwa bead worker and traditionalist
- Louisa Keyser Dat So La Lee (ca. 1829–1925), Washoe basket weaver
- Loretta Kelsey, last living speaker of Elem Pomo
- Edith Kilbuck, Lenape missionary
- Mary Killman, Citizen Potawatomi, Olympic synchronized swimmer, b. 1991
- Robin Wall Kimmerer, a Potawatomi biologist, activist, and bestselling author
- Kuiliy, Pend d'Oreille warrior
- Kimberly Tilsen-Brave Heart, an Oglala Lakota and Jewish businesswoman and chef from South Dakota.

== L ==
- Madeline La Framboise (1740–1846), Odawa fur trader
- Winona LaDuke (born 1959), White Earth Ojibwe activist, environmentalist, economist, and writer
- Carole LaFavor, two-spirit Ojibwa novelist and activist
- Rosalyn LaPier, Blackfeet Tribe, ethnobotanist, writer, professor and environmental historian
- Naomi Lang (born 1978), Karuk figure skater and ice dancer
- Moscelyne Larkin (born 1925), Peoria/Shawnee ballerina
- Sally Larsen (born 1954), Apache/Aleut photographer
- Sharmagne Leland-St. John, Nespelem poet
- Annette S. Lee, Lakota, astrophysicist
- Floy Agnes Lee, biologist who worked on the Manhattan Project
- Edna Lee Paisano, Nez Perce and Laguna Pueblo, statistician
- Kelsey Leonard, (Shinnecock Indian Nation) first Native American woman to earn a degree from the University of Oxford
- Edmonia Lewis (ca. 1845–1907), African/Mississauga Ojibwe sculptor
- Lucy M. Lewis (1898–1992), Acoma Pueblo potter
- Linda Lomahaftewa, Hopi/Choctaw painter, printmaker, and educator
- Lozen, Apache warrior, spiritual leader, and compatriot to Geronimo
- Merina Lujan (Pop Chalee), Taos Pueblo painter

== M ==
- Wilma Mankiller (Cherokee Nation, 1945–2010), first female Principal Chief of the Cherokee Nation
- Maria Martinez (San Ildefonso Pueblo, 1887–1980)), potter
- Barbara McAlister, Cherokee Nation opera singer and artist
- Mabel McKay (Pomo/Patwin, 1907–1993) basket maker, medicine woman
- Doris McLemore (Wichita tribe, 1927–2016), last fluent speaker of the Wichita language
- Emma Camp Mead (Oneida, 1866–1934), hotelkeeper and herbalist
- Isabel Meadows (1846–1939), Rumsen Ohlone language consultant and last speaker of the Rumsen language
- Grace Medicine Flower, Santa Clara Pueblo ceramic artist
- Melissa Melero-Moose (Northern Paiute/Modoc) mixed-media artist, curator
- Methoataske, mother of Tecumseh and Tenskwatawa (Shawnee)
- Elaine Miles (born 1960), Cayuse-Nez Perce actress
- Devon A. Mihesuah, Choctaw Nation writer
- Deborah A. Miranda, Esselen/Chumash-French poet
- Nancy Marie Mithlo (Chiricahua Apache), curator, writer and professor
- Katrina Mitten, Miami Tribe of Oklahoma beadwork artist
- Catherine Montour (1710–1804), Seneca leader
- Mountain Wolf Woman (1884–1960), Ho-Chunk Native American Church member
- Moving Robe Woman, Hunkpapa Lakota fighter in the Battle of Little Bighorn
- Mary Musgrove, Muscogee Creek interpreter, trader, and political leader

== N ==
- Helen Naha, Hopi aka "Feather Woman" potter
- Nampeyo, "Hano Nampeyo", (ca. 1859–1942) Hopi-Tewa potter
- Elva Nampeyo, Hopi-Tewa potter
- Fannie Nampeyo, Hopi-Tewa potter
- Iris Nampeyo, Hopi-Tewa potter
- Dextra Nampeyo Quotskuyva, Hopi-Tewa (daughter of Rachel) potter
- Nora Naranjo Morse, Santa Clara Pueblo potter
- Sally Noble (Chimariko), last speaker of the Chimariko language
- Roscinda Nolasquez (Cupeño, 1892–1987), last known speaker of the Cupeño language

== O ==
- Hannah Ocuish (Peqquot, died 1786), executed
- Dora Old Elk (born 1977), Apsáalooke/Sioux artist
- Old-Lady-Grieves-The-Enemy, Pawnee warrior
- Diane O'Leary (Comanche, 1939–2013), artist, nurse
- Harriet Wright O'Leary (Choctaw, 1916–1999), American teacher and politician and the first woman to serve on the tribal council of the Choctaw Nation of Oklahoma
- One Who Walks With the Stars, Oglala Lakota warrior in the Battle of Little Bighorn

== P ==
- LaRue Parker (Caddo Nation, 1935–2011), chairperson
- Deborah Parker (Tulalip, born 1970), activist and former vice-chair of the Tulalip Tribes
- Essie Parrish (Kashaya Pomo, 1902–1979), basket weaver, author
- Elise Paschen (Osage Nation), poet
- Lotsee Patterson (Comanche), librarian and professor
- Tillie Paul (Tlingit, 1863–1952), educator and Presbyterian Church activist
- Elizabeth Peratrovich (Tlingit, 1911–1958), civil rights activist
- Susan La Flesche Picotte (1865–1915), Omaha/Ponca/Iowa, first female Native American physician
- Lori Piestewa (Hopi, 1979–2003), soldier killed in Iraq
- Pine Leaf, Crow warrior
- Pocahontas (Powhatan, 1595–1617), diplomat, wife of John Rolfe, rescued Captain John Smith from his execution
- Freda Porter (Lumbee, born 1957), applied mathematician and environmental scientist
- Pretty-Shield (Crow Nation), medicine woman and autobiographer

== Q ==
- Jaune Quick-To-See Smith (Salish-Kootenai/Shoshone/Métis, born 1940) artist

== R ==
- Rattling Blanket Woman (Miniconjou), mother of Crazy Horse
- Avis Red Bear, Sioux journalist
- Delphine Red Shirt, Oglala writer and chair of Nongovernmental Organization Committee on the International Decade of the World's Indigenous Peoples at the United Nations
- Jeri Redcorn, Caddo/Citizen Potawatomi (born ca. 1940), potter
- Red Wing (1884–1974), Winnebago silent film actress
- Luana Reyes, Confederated Colville Tribes (Sinixt) health activist and educator, 1933–2001
- G. Anne Richardson, chief of the Rappahannock tribe
- Toby Riddle (1848–1920), Modoc interpreter and diplomat
- Luana Ross, Confederated Salish and Kootenai Tribes sociologist and author
- Mary G. Ross, Cherokee Nation, aerospace engineer
- Wendy Rose (Hopi/Miwok, born 1948) anthropologist and writer
- Running Eagle, Blackfoot war chief

== S ==
- Sacagawea (ca. 1787–1812), Shoshone guide for the Lewis and Clark Expedition, wife of Toussaint Charbonneau
- Judith Salmon Kaur, Choctaw, oncologist
- Shoni Schimmel (born 1992), Umatilla basketball player
- Jane Johnston Schoolcraft (1800–1842), Sault Ste. Marie Ojibwe writer
- Anfesia Shapsnikoff (1901–1973), Aleut artist and educator
- Joanne Shenandoah (Oneida Indian Nation, 1957–2022), singer and guitarist
- Clara Sherman (Navajo, 1914–2010), weaver
- Leslie Marmon Silko (born 1948), Laguna Pueblo descent writer
- Pauline Small (1924–2005), first female leader of the Crow Nation
- Cynthia Leitich Smith, Muscogee Creek Nation children's author
- Lois Bougetah Smoky (1907–1981), Kiowa painter and bead artist
- Molly Spotted Elk (1903–1977), Penobscot actress and dancer
- Minnie Spotted-Wolf (Blackfeet), first female Native American Marine
- Boeda Strand (Snohomish, 1834–1928), basket weaver
- Virginia Stroud (Keetoowah Cherokee/Muscogee Creek, born 1951) painter, author, and former Miss Indian America.
- Anita Louise Suazo, Santa Clara Pueblo potter
- Madonna Swan (Lakota, 1928–1993), educator, memoirist
- Roxanne Swentzell, Santa Clara Pueblo ceramicist and sculptor

== T ==
- Tacumwah (ca. 1720–ca. 1790), chief of the Miami tribe and businesswoman
- Margaret Tafoya, (1904–2001) Santa Clara Pueblo potter
- Maria Tallchief (1925–2013), Osage ballerina
- Marjorie Tallchief, Osage ballerina
- Mary TallMountain, Koyukon and Irish-Scottish poet and storyteller
- Margo Tamez (born 1962), Jumano Apache/Lipan Apache activist, poet, community historian, educator
- Gladys Tantaquidgeon (1899–2005), Mohegan elder, anthropologist, historian, and medicine woman
- Luci Tapahonso (born 1953), Navajo poet and lecturer
- Leonidas Tapia (died 1977), Ohkay Owingeh Pueblo potter
- Kimberly Teehee (born 1968), Cherokee Nation senior policy advisor for Native American Affairs in the White House Domestic Policy Council
- Kateri Tekakwitha (1656–1680), Mohawk/Algonquian woman canonized by the Roman Catholic church
- Lucy Telles, Mono Lake Paiute/Yosemite Miwok basketweaver, ca. 1885–1955
- Charlene Teters, Spokane tribe artist, writer, activist, educator, and lecturer
- The Other Magpie, Crow fighter at the Battle of the Rosebud
- Jennie Thlunaut (1892–1986), Tlingit artist
- Lucy Thompson (1856–1932), Yurok writer
- Jennie Thlunaut, Tlingit (1982–1986) Chilkat weaver
- Susette LaFlesche Tibbles (1854–1903), Omaha/Iowa/Ponca lecturer, writer, and artist
- Sheila Tousey (born 1960), Menominee/Stockbridge-Munsee actress
- Toypurina (born 1761), Tongva medicine woman and rebel
- Gail Tremblay, Onondaga/Mi'kmaq artist and poet
- Catherine Troeh (1911–2007), Chinook activist, artist, elder, historian
- Hulleah Tsinhnahjinnie, Muscogee Creek/Seminole/Navajo photographer
- Faye Tso (1933–2004), Navajo potter
- Minnie Two Shoes, Assiniboine journalist
- Tyonajanegen, Oneida woman who fought in the 1777 Battle of Oriskany during the American Revolutionary War

== U ==
- Paula Underwood, Oneida historian
- Carrie Underwood, Muscogee Creek Nation enrolled tribal member, singer
- Atalie Unkalunt (1895–1954), Cherokee Nation, opera and Indianist singer
- Misty Upham (1982–2014), Blackfeet Nation actress

== V ==
- Pablita Velarde, Tse Tsan (1918–2006), Santa Clara Pueblo painter
- Powtawche Valerino, Mississippi Choctaw, mechanical engineer

== W ==
- Velma Wallis, Athabascan writer
- Ernestine Walkingstick, public health nurse
- Kay WalkingStick, Cherokee Nation painter and educator
- Wanagapeth (Miami tribe, died 1908), daughter of Chief Michikinikwa
- Yvonne Wanrow (born 1943), of the Confederated Tribes of the Colville Reservation
- Nancy Ward (ca. 1738–1822 or 1824), Cherokee leader
- Ingrid Washinawatok (1957–1999), assassinated Menominee activist
- Watseka (1810–1878), Potawatomi woman for whom Watseka, Illinois, is named
- Mary Jo Watson, PhD, Seminole art historian, curator, educator
- Marie Watt (born 1967), Seneca artist
- Annie Dodge Wauneka (1910–1997), Navajo activist and author
- Waziyatawin (born 1968), Dakota historian and author
- Weetamoo (ca. 1635–1676), Wampanoag chief
- Claudette White, Quechan activist and judge
- Charmaine White Face, Oglala Lakota activist and writer
- Emmi Whitehorse (born 1958), Navajo painter
- Matika Wilbur (born 1984), Swinomish/Tulalip photographer and podcaster
- Lorraine Williams, Navajo potter
- Holly Wilson (Delaware Nation/Cherokee, born 1968), sculptor, installation artist
- Sarah Winnemucca (ca. 1841–1891), Northern Paiute activist and writer
- Woman Chief (c. 1806–1858), Crow chief and warrior
- Elizabeth Woody, Warm Springs/Navajo/Wasco writer

== Y ==
- Melanie Yazzie, Navajo printmaker and educator
- Mary Youngblood, Aleut-Seminole flutist

== Z ==
- Ofelia Zepeda, Tohono O'odham linguist and writer
- Zitkala-Sa (1876–1938), Yankton Dakota writer, editor, musician, teacher and activist

== See also ==
- Gender roles in First Nations and Native American tribes
- Native American women in politics
- Native American women in the arts
