= List of municipal poets laureate in New Mexico =

This is a list of past and current municipal poets laureate serving towns, counties, and cities in New Mexico. Poets laureate serving the Navajo Nation which spans portions of New Mexico, Arizona, and Utah are also listed.

== Navajo Nation ==
- Luci Tapahonso: 2013–2015
- Laura Tohe: 2015–2019

== Albuquerque ==
- Hakim Bellamy: 2012–2014
- Jessica Helen Lopez: 2014–2016
- Manuel Gonzalez: 2016–2018
- Michelle Otero: 2018–2020
- Mary Oishi: 2020–2022
- Anna C. Martinez: 2022–2024
- Damien Flores: 2024–

== Las Vegas ==
- Kayt Peck: 2021–

== Santa Fe ==
- Arthur Sze: 2006–2008
- Valerie Martínez: 2008–2010
- Joan Logghe: 2010–2012
- Jon Davis: 2012–2014
- Elizabeth Jacobson: 2019–2021
- Darryl Wellington: 2021–2023
- Tommy Archuleta: 2024–

== Silver City/Grants ==
- Bonnie Buckley Maldonado – 2012-2014
- Elise Stuart – 2014-2017
- Beate Sigriddaughter and Jack Crocker – 2017-2019
- Eve West Bessier – 2019-2021
- Allison Waterman – 2021-2024
- Heather Frankland – 2024–2026

== Taos ==
- Sawnie Morris: 2018–2019
- Catherine Strisik: 2020–2022
- Joshua Concha: 2022–
