= Mark Wolf =

Mark Wolf may refer to:

- Mark L. Wolf (born 1946), American judge
- Mark Soldier Wolf, Arapaho tribal elder, US Marine Corps and story teller
