= Kushtaka =

Shapeshifters in Tlingit folklore

Kóoshdaa káa or Kushtaka (lit. "land otter man") are mythical shape-shifting creatures found in the folklore of the Tlingit peoples of the Pacific Northwest Coast of North America.

== Description ==
They are similar to the 'Watsa of the Tsimshian people, Nat'ina of the Dena'ina Alaska Native peoples of South Central Alaska, and the Urayuli of the Yup'ik in Western Alaska.

Physically, Kóoshdaa káa are shape-shifters capable of assuming human form, the form of an otter and potentially other forms. In some accounts, a Kóoshdaa káa is able to assume the form of any species of otter; in others, only one. Accounts of their behavior seem to conflict with one another. In some stories, Kóoshdaa káa are cruel creatures who take delight in tricking poor Tlingit sailors to their deaths. In others, they are friendly and helpful, frequently saving the lost from death by freezing. In many stories, the Kóoshdaa káa save the lost individual by distracting them with curiously otter-like illusions of their family and friends as they transform their subject into a fellow Kóoshdaa káa, thus allowing them to survive in the cold. Naturally, this is counted a mixed blessing. However, Kóoshdaa káa legends are not always pleasant. In some legends it is said the Kóoshdaa káa will imitate the cries of a baby or the screams of a woman to lure victims to the river. Once there, the Kóoshdaa káa either kills the person and tears them to shreds or will turn them into another Kóoshdaa káa.

Legends have it Kóoshdaa káa can be warded off through copper, urine, dogs, and in some stories, fire.

Since the Kóoshdaa káa mainly preys on small children, it has been thought by some that it was used by Tlingit mothers to keep their children from wandering close to the ocean by themselves.

It is also said that the Kóoshda káa emit a high pitched, three part whistle in the pattern of low-high-low.

== In modern literature ==
Kóoshdaa káa appear in Pamela Rae Huteson's Legends in Wood: Stories of the Totems in the legend 'War with the Land Otter Men', as well as Pamela Rae Huteson's Transformation Masks with the 'Kooshdakhaa Den'; and Garth Stein's Raven Stole the Moon. Harry D. Colp describes a miner's encounter with the Kóoshdaa káa at Thomas Bay in the short story "The Strangest Story Ever Told."

It is also the subject of the Alaskan-set horror novel Kushtaka by David Pierdomenico. Kóoshdaa káas also appear in William Giraldi's novel Hold the Dark (2015). The second book of Ann McCaffrey's science-fiction The Twins of Petaybee series, Maelstrom, features a species of shape-changing deep-sea otter that refer to themselves as Kóoshdaa káa.

The Kóoshdaa káa is the main antagonist in the Bill Schweigert novel The Beast of Barcroft (2015).

They are also depicted in the book Shamans and Kushtakas: North Coast Tales of the Supernatural by Mary Giraudo Beck.

The short story "Kushtuka" by Mathilda Zeller, features the eponymous creature as a shapeshifter who assumes the image of the protagonist. The story is featured in the collection "Never Whistle at Night: An Indigenous Dark Fiction Anthology" published in 2023.

== In television ==
The Kóoshdaa káa is investigated in the 2015 Discovery Channel series Missing in Alaska in episode 10 "Shapeshifters from the River".

The Kóoshdaa káa is investigated in the 2014 series Alaska Monsters in episode 3 "The Otterman".
