= Broker (disambiguation) =

A broker is a party that mediates between a buyer and a seller.

Broker may also refer to:

== Occupations ==
- Broker-dealer, a person or organization that engages in trading securities
- Customs broker, one who clears goods through customs for import or export
- Information broker, a person or business finds information on individuals as a commodity
- Information broker, also known as an information consultant, an information professional who provides information as a service
- Real estate agent, also known as a real estate broker, person representing sellers or buyers of property

== People ==
- Fred Broker (1893–1971), American National Football League player
- Gulabdas Broker (1909–2006), Gujarati language author from India
- Ignatia Broker (1919–1987), American Ojibwe writer
- Thomas Bröker (born 1985), German football winger

== Software ==
- Message broker or integration broker, a module that translates a message from the formal messaging protocol of the sender to the formal messaging protocol of the receiver
- Object request broker, middleware that allows programmers to make program calls from one computer to another via a network
- Storage Resource Broker, a data grid middleware software system produced by the San Diego Supercomputer Center
- Tunnel broker, a service provides a network tunnel

== Other uses ==
- The Broker, a novel by John Grisham
- Broker (2010 film), a R. P. Patnaik Telugu film
- Broker (2022 film), a South Korean film directed by Hirokazu Kore-eda
- Broker, Lewis, a small hamlet in the Outer Hebrides of Scotland
- "The Broker" (Matlock), a 1990 television episode
- The Power Broker, 1974 biography of Robert Moses
- Broker, a fictional borough based on Brooklyn in Grand Theft Auto IV

== See also ==
- Broker § Types of brokers
