= Pretty Nose =

Arapaho woman

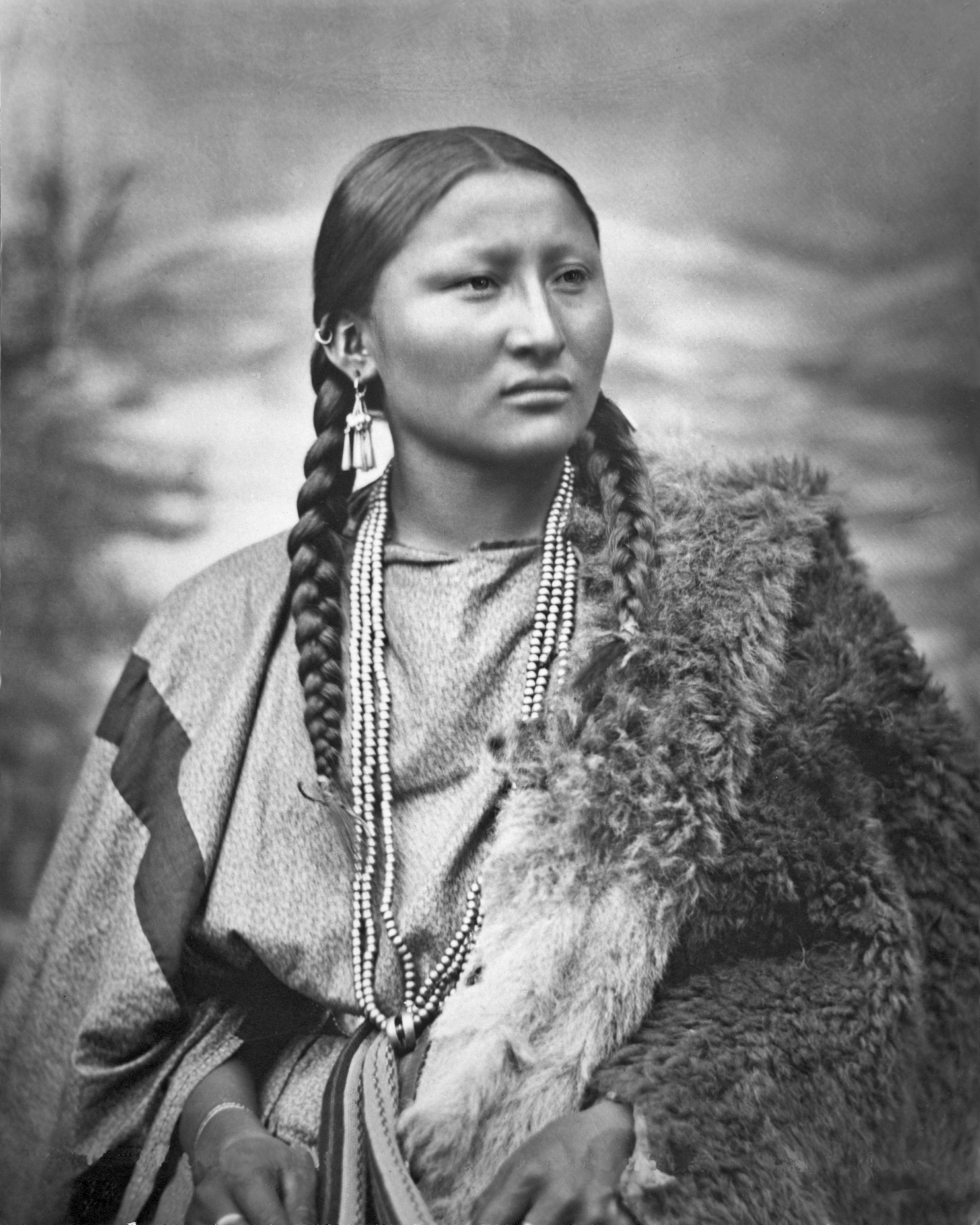
- Pretty Nose in 1879, with woven cloth belt and buffalo robe
- Born: c. 1851
- Died: after 1952
- Citizenship: Arapaho
- Known for: Participation in the Battle of the Little Bighorn
- Relatives: Mark Soldier Wolf (descendant)

Pretty Nose (c. 1851 – after 1952) was an Arapaho woman who participated in the Battle of the Little Bighorn. She lived to be at least 101 years old and reportedly became a war chief.

== Biography ==
Pretty Nose was Arapaho, though in some sources she is referred to as Cheyenne. She was identified as Arapaho on the basis of her red, black and white beaded cuffs. (Note: The two tribes were allies at the Battle of the Little Bighorn and are still officially grouped together as the Cheyenne and Arapaho Tribes)

Pretty Nose took part in the Battle of the Little Bighorn in 1876 with a combined Cheyenne/Arapaho detachment.

Pretty Nose's descendant, Mark Soldier Wolf, became an Arapaho tribal elder who served in the US Marine Corps during the Korean War. She witnessed his return to the Wind River Indian Reservation in 1952, at the age of 101. At the time he reported her wearing cuffs that he said indicated she was a war chief.

Pretty Nose was portrayed in the 2017 novel The Vengeance of Mothers: The Journals of Margaret Kelly & Molly McGill by Jim Fergus.

== Photographs ==
A photograph taken by Laton Alton Huffman c. 1880 shows Pretty Nose with a young woman named Spotted Fawn. One source from the Montana Memory Project implies that they were sisters. She appears in several silver prints by Huffman, which are now held in the collection of the Princeton Library. Her photo is featured on the cover of The Spirit of Indian Women magazine.

== See also ==
- Buffalo Calf Road Woman
- Moving Robe Woman
- Minnie Hollow Wood
- One Who Walks with the Stars
