= Urayuli =

Cryptids

Urayuli, or "Hairy Men," as translated from most native Yupik languages, are a Cryptid race (similar to Bigfoot or a Yeti) of creatures that live in the woodland areas of southwestern Alaska. Stories of the Urayuli describe them as standing 10 feet tall with long shaggy fur and luminescent eyes. They are said to emit a high-pitched cry, resembling that of a loon. Their long, lanky arms have been described as reaching down to their ankles.

Rumored to live in the forests near the area of Lake Iliamna, the Urayuli are said to be peaceful creatures, unlike the Kushtaka of Southeastern Alaska.

It is said the Urayuli are transformed children who become lost in the woods at night. It is possible that this tale was started to keep children indoors at night.
