= Daryl Baldwin =

American academic and linguist

- Education: University of Montana (BS, MA)
- Occupation: Linguist
- Known for: Miami language

Member of the National Endowment for the Humanities
- Incumbent
- Assumed office October 1, 2021
- President: Joe Biden; Donald Trump

Daryl Baldwin is an American academic and linguist who specializes in the Myaamia language. An enrolled member of the Miami Tribe of Oklahoma, Baldwin has served as a member of the cultural resource advisory committee of the Miami Tribe.

== Education ==
Baldwin received a Bachelor of Science and a Master of Arts in Native American linguistics from the University of Montana.

== Career ==
Baldwin is the director of the Myaamia Center at Miami University in Oxford, Ohio. The center works to revitalize endangered languages. His devotion to the work of language revitalization led to the creation of the Myaamia Center at Miami University and his appointment as the director and was chosen in 2016 as a MacArthur Foundation Fellow. Baldwin seeks to revitalize languages for the people of the community, language and cultural revitalization.

After reading a draft of David Costa's thesis on the Miami-Illinois language, Baldwin realized he would need training in linguistics to not only understand Costa's work but also work to revitalize his own language and to teach it to others. The realization led Baldwin to apply for a graduate degree at the University of Montana. Since 1996, Baldwin began to teach himself and his family and four children the Miami language. Baldwin also learned through studies held by the Smithsonian's National Anthropological Archives.

=== Linguistic work ===
Baldwin works with Myaamia people developing culture and language-based educational materials and programs for the community. Baldwin has taught and raised his four children as native speakers of Myaamia and continues to teach others as assistant educational leadership professor.

Much of Baldwin's work has been collaborative, contributing to edited collections and journal articles, and he also works with other linguists such as Leanne Hinton's National Breath of Life project, a two-week biennial gathering of linguists sharing, finding and utilizing linguistic archival sources.

== Publications ==
=== Books ===
- Baldwin, Daryl; Costa, David (2005). myaamia neehi peewaalia kaloosioni mahsinaakani: A Miami-Peoria Dictionary. Miami Tribe of Oklahoma. ISBN 978-0-9765837-0-7.

=== Edited volumes ===
- Baldwin, Daryl; Ironstrack, George (2015). "Mihšihkinaahkwa (Little Turtle)". In Gugin, Linda C.; St. Clair, James E. (eds.). Indiana's 200: The People Who Shaped The Hoosier State. Indianapolis: Indiana Historical Society Press. ISBN 978-0-87195-387-2.
- Baldwin, Daryl (2014). "oowaaha myaamiaataweenki: Miami Is Spoken Here". In Wiley, Terrence G.; Peyton, Joy Kreeft; Christian, Donna; Moore, Sarah Catherine K.; Liu, Na (eds.). Handbook of Heritage, Community, and Native American Languages in the United States. New York: Routledge. ISBN 978-0-415-52066-9.
- Baldwin, Daryl; Baldwin, Karen; Baldwin, Jessie; Baldwin, Jarrid (2013). "Myaamiaataweenki oowaaha: Miami Spoken Here". In Hinton, Leanne (ed.). Bringing our Languages Home: Language Revitalization for Families. Berkeley, CA: Heyday Books. ISBN 978-1-59714-200-7.
- Warner, S. Mark; Baldwin, Daryl (2004). "Building Ties: The Collaboration between the Miami Nation and Archaeology". In Shackel, Paul A.; Chambers, Erve J. (eds.). Places In Mind: Public Archaeology as Applied Anthropology. New York: Routledge.

=== Journal articles ===
- Whalen, D. H.; Moss, M.; Baldwin, D. (2016). "Healing through language: Positive physical health effects of indigenous language use". F1000Research. 5: 852. doi:10.12688/f1000research.8656.1. hdl:10125/42055.
- Mosley-Howard, G. Susan; Baldwin, Daryl; Ironstrack, George; Rousmaniere, Kate; Burke, Bobbe (February 2016). "Niila Myaamia (I Am Miami): Identity and Retention of Miami Tribe College Students". Journal of College Student Retention: Research, Theory & Practice. 17 (4): 437–461. doi:10.1177/1521025115579249. S2CID 144318118.
- McCarty, Teresa L.; Baldwin, Daryl; Ironstrack, George M.; Olds, Julie (2013). "neetawaapantamaanki iilinwiaanki meehkamaanki niiyoonaani: Searching for Our Talk and Finding Ourselves". In McCarty, Teresa L.; Littlebear, Richard E. (eds.). Language Planning and Policy in Native America: History, Theory, Praxis. Bristol: Multilingual Matters. ISBN 978-1-84769-862-9.
- Baldwin, Daryl; Olds, Julie (2007). "Miami Indian Language and Cultural Research at Miami University". In Cobb, Daniel M.; Fowler, Loretta (eds.). Beyond Red Power: New Perspectives on American Indian Politics and Activism. Santa Fe: School of American Research Press.
- Baldwin, Daryl (2002). "Mihšihkinaahkwa: maamiikaahkia akima". Northwest Ohio Quarterly. 74 (1): 22–28.

=== Lecture ===
- Baldwin, Daryl (2003). Miami language reclamation: from Ground Zero (Speech). Speaker Series No. 24. University of Minnesota: Center for Writing.
