= Luci Tapahonso =

Navaho poet laureate

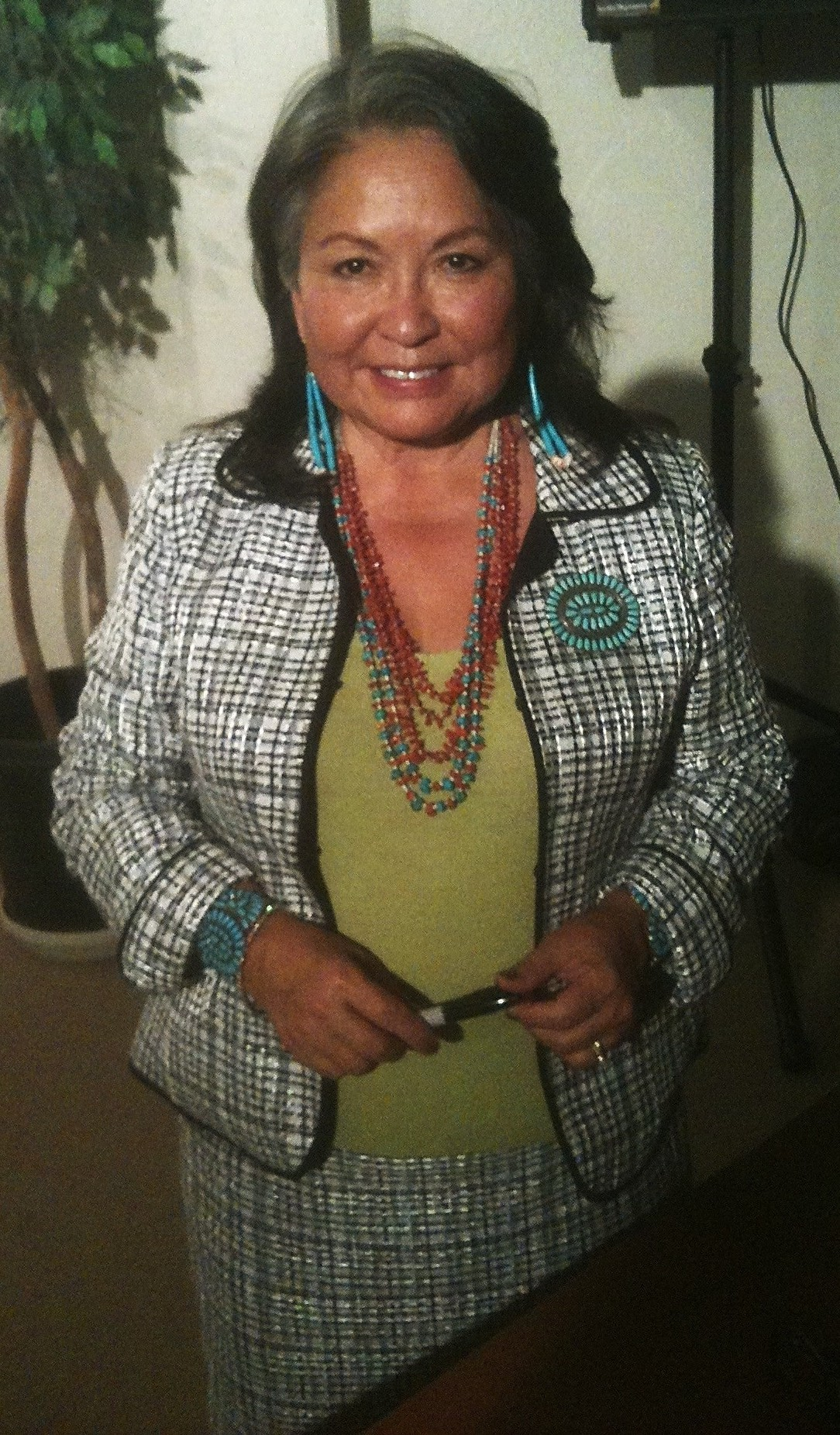
- Tapahonso at Diné College in 2011
- Born: November 8, 1953 (age 72); Shiprock, New Mexico, USA
- Education: B.A., English, U. of New Mexico
- Occupations: Writer, university lecturer
- Writing career
- Genre: Poetry
- Subject: Native American Studies

Luci Tapahonso (born November 8, 1953) is a Navajo poet and a lecturer in Native American Studies. She is the first poet laureate of the Navajo Nation, succeeded by Laura Tohe.

== Early life and education ==
Tapahonso was born on the Navajo reservation in Shiprock, New Mexico to Eugene Tapahonso Sr. and Lucille Deschenne Tapahonso. English was not spoken on the family farm, and Tapahonso learned it as a second tongue after her native Navajo. Following schooling at Navajo Methodist School in Farmington, New Mexico, she attended Shiprock High School and graduated in 1971. She embarked on a career as a journalist and investigative reporter before beginning her studies at the University of New Mexico in 1976. There she first met the novelist and poet Leslie Marmon Silko, who was a faculty member and who proved to be an important influence on Tapahonso's early writing. She initially intended to study journalism at New Mexico, but Silko convinced her to change her major to creative writing. She earned her bachelor's degree in 1980. In 1983, Tapahonso gained her MA in Creative Writing, and she proceeded to teach, first at New Mexico and later at the University of Kansas, the University of Arizona, and the University of New Mexico.

== Writings ==
Silko helped Tapahonso publish her first story, "The Snake Man," in 1978. Her first collection of poetry, One More Shiprock Night (written when she was an undergraduate), was published in 1981, but did not make much impact. Following Silko's lead, Tapahonso's early work is often mystical and places much importance on the idea of the feminine as a source of power and balance in the world. She also frequently uses her family and childhood friends in her poetry. Several more collections followed, as well as many individual poems which have been anthologized in others' collections, activist literature, and writing in magazines.

Her 1993 collection Saánii Dahataal (the women are singing), written in Navajo and English, was the first to receive international recognition, a reputation then cemented by blue horses rush in a book of poetry and memoirs published in 1997.

In 2008 Tapahonso published A Radiant Curve, which won the Arizona Book Award for Poetry in 2009.

Tapahonso's writing, unlike many Native American writers, is a translation from original work she has created in her tribe's native tongue. Her Navajo work includes original songs and chants designed for performance. For this reason, her English work is strongly rhythmic and uses syntactical structures unusual in English language poetry.

== Awards ==
- Awarded the title of Poet Laureate of the Navajo Nation, 2013
- Arizona Book Award for Poetry, New Mexico Book Coop, 2009
- Lifetime Achievement Award, Native Writers' Circle of the Americas, 2006
- Wordcraft Circle Storyteller of the Year (Readings/Performance) Award, 1999
- Award for Best Poetry from the Mountains and Plain's Booksellers Association, 1998
- New Mexico Eminent Scholar award, New Mexico Commission of Higher Education, 1989
- Excellent Instructor Award, U. of New Mexico, 1985
- American Book Awards, Honorable Mention, 1983
- Southwestern Association of Indian Affairs Literature Fellowship, 1981

== See also ==
- List of Native American women of the United States
- List of writers from peoples indigenous to the Americas
- Paula Gunn Allen
- Sherwin Bitsui
- Joy Harjo
- N. Scott Momaday
- Irvin Morris
- Simon J. Ortiz
