= A Radiant Curve =

Compilation of poems and stories written by professor Luci Tapahonso

First edition

A Radiant Curve is a compilation of poems and stories written by professor Luci Tapahonso. It is one of six collective poetry works by Tapahonso. A Radiant Curve is a work with basis in daily life, which is closely related to Luci Tapahonso's Navajo culture. These stories include memories of her family, generational teachings, and her perspective as a Navajo person living in modern times. A Radiant Curve tries to emphasize storytelling in order to speak to the commonality of the shared human experience across cultures as evidenced by the double use of both Navajo and English. The book was published in 2008 by The University of Arizona Press.

== Background ==
A Radiant Curve is the sixty-fourth part of a collection of over eighty books in a series called SunTracks, first published in 1971. A Radiant Curve explores Tapahonso's past to tell poems filled with Navajo culture that describe the beauty in everyday life, Navajo traditions, and the importance of family.

Tapahonso, born in 1953, is an accomplished indigenous writer and was named first ever poet laureate of the Navajo Nation in 2013. She was awarded the Arizona Book Award for Poetry in 2009 for A Radiant Curve. In 2006, Tapahonso received the Native Writers Circle of the Americas’ Lifetime Achievement Award and the same organization named her 1999 Storyteller of the Year. In 2018, she was awarded a Native Arts and Culture fellowship by the Native Arts and Culture Foundation. Tapahonso is the author of six books of poetry, including A Radiant Curve and three children's books. Her works are mostly in English, but contain words and phrases in Navajo.

Luci Tapahanso is one of eleven siblings born on the Navajo Reservation of Shiprock, New Mexico. She began her education as a journalist and investigative writer, but switched her major and graduated with an MA in creative writing. Along with her work as an author and poet, Tapahonso teaches and speaks about Indigenous culture as well as writing.

== Symbols and themes ==
=== Creation stories ===
Tapahonso's collection elaborates the Navajo cosmology through a discussion of the Holy Ones and the Earth Mother. The poem begins with a description of how “the first Holy Ones talk and sang as always” and that they “created light, night, and day.” Likewise, the third poem illustrates "the world created by the Holy People” and the creation of “Diné language, ceremonies, history, and beliefs.” The Earth Mother is especially revered by the Navajo and neighboring tribes. Tapahonso recounts that, “like the earth, she is young in the spring, she bears fruit in the summer...” Consistent with traditional Navajo cosmology, Tapahonso emphasizes the importance and difficulties of human curiosity.

=== Importance of tradition ===
A continuing theme of A Radiant Curve is the importance of the traditions that Tapahonso grew up with and the necessity of passing down those traditions to her grandchildren. In her prose piece "A Radiant Curve" and in her poem “Old Salt Woman” Tapahonso writes about the First Laugh ceremony, which is a child's first important milestone in Navajo culture. Throughout her work she shares traditional Navajo mythological stories.

=== Importance of women ===
Another common theme represented in A Radiant Curve is the theme of women and their importance in culture and society. In many Native American cultures, women are viewed as the source of life and were often seen as the creators of the universe in creation stories. The Navajo culture, where the stories from A Radiant Curve originate, is similarly matrilineal. This means that their society is based on the women; the household is run by women, names are based on a person's maternal clan, and women are at the center of social and economic decisions for the community. One of the stories, "A Radiant Curve," includes the origin story of Changing Woman who is a principal deity and created the ancestors of present-day Dine people. There is also Spider Woman, a holy being who guides and protects, and Old Salt Woman, primordial mother of Salt Clan and “a role model of Dine ideals." Tapahonso alludes to the importance of women in “The Round Roof Hooghan” where she claims “beauty extends from the woman” multiple times and states that the woman is the center of the home. In “Tsilii,” part of a description of a relationship is, “because I’m a Dine woman, his life revolves around me." She also equates the earth to mother in “Long Ago.”

=== Laughing ceremony ===
One of the stories explored in A Radiant Curve is the tradition of the Laughing Ceremony (A’wee Chi’deedloh), a Navajo tradition that celebrates a baby's first time laughing aloud. The rituals involved in this ceremony are heavily steeped in legend and each step recreates an aspect of the origin story of the Laughing Ceremony. This ceremony, as it is retold in A Radiant Curve, is said to have first been performed for one of the first Holy People to have human form and the baby of First Man and First Woman, known as White Shell Girl. She was listless and unhappy, so her parents called Old Salt Woman to help her. Old Salt Woman tickled White Shell Girl and placed a grain of salt on her tongue, causing her to laugh out loud for the first time. This sound had never been heard before, and a great celebration with feasts, songs, and stories was held. Old Salt Woman helped White Shell Girl hand salt to all that were present and instructed them to ask the baby for blessings as she was a holy being. In addition to the salt, White Shell Girl gave out gifts of herbs, corn, and small clay toys. Giving away these gifts would help White Shell Girl grow into a generous person. With this celebration, the Holy People ensured that White Shell Girl was surrounded by love and so would never experience loneliness. Additionally, the ceremony places great importance on humor and the happiness of the baby. White Shell Girl would eventually grow up to become Changing Woman (Asdzą́ą́ Nádleehé), a deity who created the ancestors of the modern Navajo people.

Prior to a baby's first laugh, they are said to still exist in the world of the Holy People (Diyin Dinéè). The laugh is an indication that the baby is leaving the spiritual world and is now joining the world of their human family. In today's practice, the Laughing Ceremony is to be held within four days to a week of the first laugh, and other family members take on various duties to prepare for the celebration with extended family and friends. The person who elicited the laugh from the baby is tasked with being the venue for the ceremony, while the baby is acknowledged to be the host. Traditional dishes of mutton or lamb are prepared as symbols of sustenance, prosperity, and kinship. Gifts of rock salt, candy, fruit, and other small gifts are placed in large baskets to be given away to guests.

On the day of the ceremony, guests follow the traditions of the original Laughing Ceremony. They greet the baby and ask for blessings. With the parents' help, the baby ceremonially gives the guest the gift bags prepared earlier. The baby learns the virtue of generosity just as White Shell Girl did. This act also symbolizes the baby paying respect to both their spiritual and physical families.

=== Education Through Storytelling ===
The short stories and poems in A Radiant Curve, often contain lessons on morals, identity, and tradition in Navajo society. Oral tradition is an important part of many Native American cultures and was used as a way to pass down heritage and values through the generations. Tapahonso translates and records many traditional stories in her poems, educating not only Native Navajo people, but also sharing the morals and stories of her people with a wider non-native audience. A central theme of A Radiant Curve is to educate the reader of the Navajo perspective through storytelling so they might learn from the experiences of generations before them.

In traditional Native American history, oral stories were used by the elders as a form of education for the next generation. They conveyed moral truths and helped lead the people in the way of their ancestors. Tapahonso wrote A Radiant Curve in order to share those important stories with a wider audience. She believes that storytelling is a common practice that all cultures share. In order to help more people understand the Navajo culture, the stories needed to be told in this medium, and written in English. Stories are how Native Americans learned about their history and culture. Parables and mythic fables were incredibly commonplace in their world. By telling the stories in this way, Tapahonso has brought light to culture and rich history that is rarely talked about today.

Historically Native American stories were exaggerated to increase the significance of the lesson within the story. Although most stories were told as entertainment and teaching for the tribal peoples. Storytellers were held to high standards within tribal society because they held the lessons and histories needed for the tribe to continue to grow and be successful. The need for storytelling has always been about community survival, education and interaction. The importance of social interaction was greatly attributed to storytelling and the gathering that would happen for it. The need for the continuance of these oral stories has grown significantly since colonization, for many present day Native Americans, their culture is lost to them but with a new revitalization through the written form it can be found again. With this revitalization many Native Americans are able to receive the cultural teachings they need and are able to continue the tradition of passing them down to younger generations.

== Literary significance and reception ==
Released in 2008, the book was received favorably by academics and literary critics alike. Some critics praised the book's weaving together of mundane and mythic themes and the importance placed on generational wisdom, while others such as critic Kristen Ten lauded the Navajo authors use European poetic forms which she characterizes as an act of defiance.

Interspersed throughout the personal narrative of A Radiant Curve are various forms of prose (long-form prose, prose poems) and poems (prose poems, free-verse poems of varying lengths, sestina poems, and villanelle poems), together with a series of very short poems about Navajo creation stories. The poems written in sestina form are “Old Salt Woman” (page 23), “The Holy Twins” (page 31), “The Canyon Was Serene” (page 51), “Red Star Quilt” (page 64), “Dawn Boy” (page 73), and “Tsilii” (page 79). The sole poem written in villanelle form is “Near-to-the-Water” (page 71). The use of sestina and villanelle, both European forms (French- and Italian-based forms, specifically), in a book of Navajo-specific stories, serves to portray the author's resistance to the loss of cultural and individual identity. The author also portrays the strength of her culture, as well as her determination to preserve the Navajo oral storytelling tradition. The result of the author's ability to seamlessly integrate the various forms cohesively in A Radiant Curve gives the book the sense of "many voices", and one that highlights the skill, craft, and importance of oral traditions and storytelling not only in the Navajo culture but in many other Native American cultures.
