= H.R. 4002 (113th Congress) =

Bill of the United States Congress

- Long title: To revoke the charter of incorporation of the Miami Tribe of Oklahoma at the request of that tribe, and for other purposes.
- Announced in: the 113th United States Congress
- Sponsored by: Rep. Markwayne Mullin (R, OK-2)
- Number of co-sponsors: 2

Codification
- U.S.C. sections affected: 25 U.S.C. § 501 et seq.

Legislative history
- Introduced in the House as H.R. 4002 by Rep. Markwayne Mullin (R, OK-2) on February 5, 2014; Committee consideration by United States House Committee on Natural Resources, United States House Natural Resources Subcommittee on Indian and Alaska Native Affairs

The bill H.R. 4002 is a bill that would accept the request of the Miami Tribe of Oklahoma to revoke the charter of incorporation issued to that tribe and ratified by its members on June 1, 1940.

The bill was introduced into the United States House of Representatives during the 113th United States Congress.

== Background ==
The Miami Tribe of Oklahoma is the only federally recognized Native American tribe of Miami Indians in the United States. The people are descended from Miami who were removed in the 19th century from their traditional territory in present-day Indiana, Michigan, and Ohio. Of the 3,908 enrolled tribal members, 775 live in the state of Oklahoma. Enrollment in the tribe is based on documented lineal descent. They adopted a corporate charter on June 1, 1940, as a result of the Oklahoma Indian Welfare Act.

== Provisions of the bill ==
This summary is based largely on the summary provided by the Congressional Research Service, a public domain source.

The bill would accept the request of the Miami Tribe of Oklahoma to revoke the charter of incorporation issued to that tribe and ratified by its members on June 1, 1940. The bill was introduced to formally approve the Miami Tribe of Oklahoma’s request to revoke its 1940 corporate charter, a measure that had full tribal support and was endorsed by the Department of the Interior.

== Congressional Budget Office report ==
This summary is based largely on the summary provided by the Congressional Budget Office, as ordered reported by the House Committee on Natural Resources on April 9, 2014. This is a public domain source.

H.R. 4002 would revoke the charter of incorporation of the Miami Tribe of Oklahoma. Based on information provided by the Bureau of Indian Affairs, the Congressional Budget Office (CBO) estimates that implementing the legislation would have no effect on the federal budget. The tribe has not been operating under the charter for the last several decades. Enacting H.R. 4002 would not affect direct spending or revenues; therefore, pay-as-you-go procedures do not apply.

H.R. 4002 contains no intergovernmental or private-sector mandates as defined in the Unfunded Mandates Reform Act.

== Procedural history ==
H.R. 4002 was introduced into the United States House of Representatives on February 5, 2014, by Rep. Markwayne Mullin (R, OK-2). It was referred to the United States House Committee on Natural Resources and the United States House Natural Resources Subcommittee on Indian and Alaska Native Affairs. It was reported on April 28, 2014, alongside House Report 113-420. The bill was scheduled to be voted on by the House on June 23, 2014.

== Debate and discussion ==
The Department of the Interior testified that they had no objection to the charter being revoked saying that the "decision whether to maintain or revoke such a charter ultimately should be the Tribe's."

== See also ==
- List of bills in the 113th United States Congress
