= Minnie Hollow Wood =

Lakota warrior

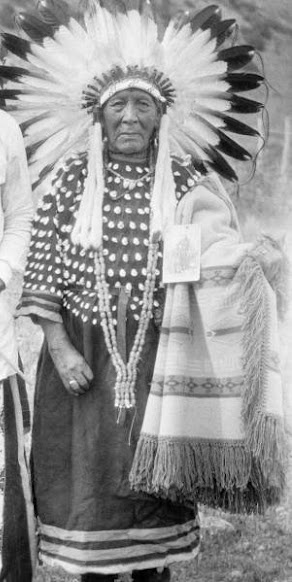
Photographed around 1925

Minnie Hollow Wood (c. 1856 – 1930s) was a Lakota woman who earned the right to wear a war bonnet because of her valor in combat against the U.S. Cavalry at the Battle of Little Big Horn. At one time, she was the only woman in her tribe entitled to wear a war bonnet.

== Biography ==
Her husband, Hollow Wood, was a Cheyenne who also fought at the Little Big Horn. Both Hollow Woods surrendered to Colonel Nelson A. Miles at Fort Keogh in Montana in 1877.

Minnie Hollow Wood lived on the Cheyenne reservation in Montana and became an informant of author and ethnologist Thomas Bailey Marquis. Marquis suggested that she was a "favorite" of Miles while she was a prisoner at Fort Keogh.

== Representation in popular culture ==
Minnie Hollow Wood was the subject of an animated short by Yvonne Russo. Minnie's War Bonnet premiered at the Red Nation International Film Festival in 2019.

== See also ==
- Buffalo Calf Road Woman – Cheyenne warrior (c. 1844–1879)
- Moving Robe Woman – Hunkpapa Sioux soldier
- One Who Walks With the Stars – Ogala Lakota warrior
- Pretty Nose – Arapaho woman
