= Annette Arkeketa =

American dramatist

Annette Arkeketa is a writer, poet, and playwright, and a member of the Otoe-Missouria Tribe of Oklahoma. She has conducted professional workshops in these fields, in addition to the creative process, script consulting, and documentary film making. She directed Native American film studies at Comanche Nation College.

== Career ==
Arkeketa also has Muscogee Creek ancestry. Her essay, "Repatriation: Religious Freedom, Equal Protection, Institutional Racism", was published in American Indian Thought (2004), a philosophical reader anthology, edited by Anne Water.

Arkeketa says,

My personal feelings about writing is that it is necessary for our Indian people to write and produce great works about ourselves. It is important to challenge ourselves to write in the genres that we are unfamiliar with. The more we write the better we become as fiction writers, non-fiction writers, playwrights, screenplay writers, journalists, poets, research and essay writers.

My more recent work has been concentrated in the area of media production for feature films and television documentaries. I believe television and the big screen is the most powerful media available to us today.

The importance of our visibility in these areas writing and the media is for our children. They deserve to perform our work on stage and film. Always they seek us on the shelves of libraries, magazine racks, and newspaper stands. They seek us as mentors and role models, let's not disappoint them.

=== Plays ===
Arkeketa's play Hokti has been produced by the Tulsa Indian Actors' Workshop (1997), Tulsa, Oklahoma and The Thunderbird Theatre (1998), Haskell Indian Nations University, Lawrence, Kansas.

Hokti is published in Stories of Our Way: An Anthology of American Indian Plays, UCLA American Indian Studies Center, 1999.

Her play Ghost Dance has been performed at public readings at the Gilcrease Museum (2001) in Tulsa, Oklahoma; Tulsa University (2002) and American Indian Community House (2003), New York, New York. It has been performed with acting workshops in Lawton, Oklahoma. In spring 2004 the full-length drama was produced by the Institute of American Indian Arts, Drama Department. Ghost Dance is published in Keepers of the Morning Star: An Anthology of Native Women's Theater, UCLA American Indian Studies Center, 2003.

=== Documentaries ===
More recently Arkeketa has worked as a documentary producer and has formed the production company Hokte Productions. Hokte means 'woman' in the Muscogee language.

Her first documentary production was about Jimmy Pena, a visual artist from Corpus Christi: it is titled Intrinsic Spirit: The Artway of Jimmy Pena (2002, approximately 24 minutes). Pena's work is shown through his pieces as visual artist and muralist.

Her next work was Muh-Du Kee: Put Them Back (2004), a 1-hour documentary that follows Jimmy Arterberry, Comanche Nation NAGPRA coordinator, through the consultation process with Colorado state and federal institutions to repatriate the remains of his people. This documentary explores Arterberry's views about the NAGPRA process, archaeologists, policies, and solutions to a controversial human rights issues for Native Americans.

Pahdopony: See how deep the water is (2005) is a 21-minute film about the life of Juanita Pahdopony (Comanche), an artist, educator and activist.

Chief George (2009) examines Rev. George Akeen (Cheyenne/Wichita) and his peacekeeping mission to the Middle East.

== Awards ==
- In 2000, Arkeketa was named Mentor of the Year by the Wordcraft Circle of Native Writers and Storytellers.
- She was awarded the Writer of the Year for Playwriting in 1998 for her play Hokti by the Wordcraft Circle of Native Writers and Storytellers.

== Work ==
=== Plays ===
- Pahdopony: See How Deep the Water Is
- Ghost Dance, in Keepers of the Morning Star: An Anthology of Native Women's Theater, UCLA American Indian Studies Center.
- Hokti, in Stories of Our Way: An Anthology of American Indian Plays, Hanay Geiogamah and Jaye T. Darby (Editors), UCLA American Indian Studies Center, 1999.

=== Poetry ===
- The Terms of a Sister, self-published.

=== Anthologies ===
- American Indian Thought: Philosophical Essays, Anne Waters (editor), Blackwell Pub.
- Gatherings, Volume X, A Retrospective of the First Decade, Greg Young-Ing & Florene Belmore (editors), Penticton: Theytus Books
- Windward Review, edited by Patricia Wimberly, Texas A & M University, 1998.
- Gatherings, Volume VIII: Shaking the Belly, Releasing the Sacred Clown, Edited by Joyce B. Joe and Susan M. Beaver, Penticton: Theytus Books
- The Indian Summer issue of phati'tude Literary Magazine
- Gatherings, Volume VII, Standing Ground: Strength and Solidarity Amidst Dissolving Boundaries, co-edited by Kateri Akiwenzie Damm and Jeannette Armstrong, Penticton: Theytus Books
- Returning the Gift: Poetry and Prose from the First North American Native Writers' Festival, Sun Tracks Books, No 29), University of Arizona Press.
- Indian Market Magazine, Santa Fe, NM, 1994.
- Durable Breath: Contemporary Native American Poetry, John E. Smelcer, D. L. Birchfield (editors), Salmon Run Pub.
- Plains Native American Literature, Simon and Schuster, 1993.
- That's What She Said: Contemporary Poetry and Fiction by Native American Women, Rayna Green (editor), Indiana University Press.
- Oklahoma Indian Markings, edited by Francine Ringold, Nimrod, Arts and Humanities Council of Tulsa, 1989.

=== Writing available online ===
- Too Much For The Average Indian IX.
- Too Much For The Average Indian XI.
- Too Much For The Average Indian XII.
- The terms of a sister
- Project Muse
