= Buffalo Calf Road Woman =

Cheyenne warrior (c. 1844–1879)

- Mó'kėheméóná'e; Otseemėhe'e

Cheyenne leader

Personal details
- Born: c. 1844 Interior Plains
- Died: May 1879 (aged c. 35) Miles City, Montana, U.S.
- Cause of death: Diphtheria or malaria
- Spouse: Black Coyote
- Relations: Brother, Chief Comes in Sight
- Children: 2
- Known for: Rescuing her wounded brother at Battle of the Rosebud. According to oral tradition, she knocked Custer off his horse at the Battle of the Little Bighorn

Buffalo Calf Road Woman (Note: Cheyenne: possibly Mó'kėheméóná'e) or Brave Woman (Note: Cheyenne: Otséémėhé'e) (c. 1844 – 1879) was a Northern Cheyenne woman who saved her wounded warrior brother, Chief Comes in Sight, in the Battle of the Rosebud (as it was named by the United States) in June 1876. Her rescue helped rally the Cheyenne warriors to win the battle. She fought next to her husband in the Battle of the Little Bighorn nine days later. In 2005, Northern Cheyenne storytellers broke more than 100 years of silence about the battle, and they credited Buffalo Calf Road Woman with striking the blow that knocked Lieutenant Colonel George Armstrong Custer off his horse before he died.

== Biography ==
During the Battle of the Rosebud, the Cheyenne and Lakota, allied under the leadership of Crazy Horse, had been retreating, and they left the wounded Chief Comes in Sight on the battlefield. Suddenly Buffalo Calf Road Woman rode out onto the battlefield at full speed and grabbed up her brother, carrying him to safety. Her courageous rescue caused the Cheyenne to rally, and they defeated General George Crook and his forces. In honor of Buffalo Calf Road Woman, the Cheyenne called the Battle of Rosebud "The Fight Where the Girl Saved Her Brother".

Buffalo Calf Road Woman is documented as also having fought at the Battle of Little Bighorn. There she fought alongside her husband Black Coyote. In June 2005, the Northern Cheyenne broke their more than 100 years of silence about the battle. In a public recounting of Cheyenne oral history of the battle, tribal storytellers spoke of how it was Buffalo Calf Road Woman who had struck the blow that knocked Custer off his horse before he died in the Battle of the Little Big Horn. In 2017 Wallace Bearchum, Director of Tribal Services for the Northern Cheyenne, noted that Buffalo Calf Road Woman was an "excellent markswoman", but it was a club-like object she used and not a gun to knock General Custer off his horse.

After surrendering to the U.S., Buffalo Calf Road Woman, her husband Black Coyote, and their two children were relocated with most of the Northern Cheyennes to the Southern Cheyenne Reservation in Indian Territory (present-day Oklahoma). In September, 1878 she and her family were part of the Northern Cheyenne Exodus, a breakout from the Oklahoma reservation to their home in Montana. Along the way, her husband shot and killed a Cheyenne chief named Black Crane, and their family totaling 8 people was banished from Little Wolf's band of Cheyennes. After this, Black Coyote and two other Cheyenne men attacked two U.S. soldiers along Mizpah Creek in Montana, killing one. Soldiers came from Fort Keogh and hunted the family down, capturing them 5 days later on April 10, 1879. This event became known as the Mizpah Creek incidents. The small group was taken to Miles City, Montana, where the three men including Black Coyote were tried for murder and scheduled to be executed on June 8, 1879. While her husband was in prison, Buffalo Calf Road Woman died, "some said of the white man's coughing disease", in May, 1879 at Miles City, Montana. When Black Coyote learned of this, he hanged himself in prison. She was also known as Buffalo Calf Trail Woman.

== See also ==
- Moving Robe Woman
- Minnie Hollow Wood
- One Who Walks With the Stars
- Pretty Nose
- The Other Magpie
