= Miami Tribe of Oklahoma =

Native American tribe in Oklahoma

Total population
- 3,908

Regions with significant populations
- United States (Oklahoma)

Languages
- Myaamia, English

Religion
- Christianity, traditional tribal religion

Related ethnic groups
- Peoria, Kaskaskia, Shawnee people, Wea, Illinois, and other Algonquian peoples

The Miami Tribe of Oklahoma (Miami-Illinois: myaamionki noošonke siipionki) is the only federally recognized Native American tribe of Miami Indians in the United States. The people are descended from Miami who were removed in the 19th century from their traditional territory in present-day Indiana, Michigan, and Ohio.

== Name ==
The name myaamionki noošonke siipionki, translates as "Miami homelands along the Neosho River". The name 'Miami' derives from Myaamia (plural Myaamiaki), the tribe's autonym (name for themselves) in their Algonquian language; it appears to have been derived from an older term meaning 'downstream people’. Some scholars contended the Miami called themselves the Twightwee (also spelled Twatwa), supposedly an onomatopoeic reference to their sacred bird, the sandhill crane. However, recent studies have shown that Twightwee derives from the Delaware language name for the Miamis, tuwéhtuwe, a name of unknown etymology.

== Language ==
Tribal citizens traditionally spoke the Miami-Illinois language, one of the Algonquian languages, but few do today. The tribe partners with Miami University, and one result of that partnership is the Myaamia Center. The Myaamia Center is working to revitalize the language and culture. The Myaamia language is particularly well-documented in early sources (including a complete Illinois-French dictionary). The tribe and the university work together to conduct research projects to revitalize Miami language and culture, and to offer university students opportunities to visit and work with the tribe on various projects.

== Government ==
Map of Miami Tribe of Oklahoma's tribal jurisdictional area (OTSA) and nearby jurisdiction areas.

The tribe is headquartered in Miami, Oklahoma. Of the over 7,000 enrolled tribal citizens, 775 live in the state of Oklahoma. The Miami Tribe issues its own tribal vehicle tags and operates its own housing authority.

As of 2025, the current administration is:

- Akima (Chief): Douglas G Lankford
- Niišonaminki Akima (Second Chief): Dustin Olds
- Aacimwa (Secretary-Treasurer): Donya Williams
- Aacimwa (First Councilperson): Tera Hatley
- Aacimwa (Second Councilperson): Nate Poyfair

== Tribal programs ==
Aatotankiki Myaamiaki is the Miami Nation quarterly newspaper. The tribe is in the process of building the Myaamia Complex, for the benefit of tribal elders, to house the food program and tribal library.

== Economic development ==
To provide economic development for the community, the tribe created Miami Nation Enterprises, which oversees tribally owned companies. These include Miami Business Services, which provides personnel, information technologies, and business supplies; Miami Designs, which provides graphic art and promotional materials; Miami Cineplex, a movie theater and arcade; and TSI Global Companies, a systems integrator with expertise in audiovisual systems, low voltage cabling, security and access control, as well as electrical contracting. Additionally, the tribe owns one smokeshop and two casinos (Prairie Sun and Prairie Moon). Their estimated annual tribal economic impact is $16,700,000.

== Culture ==
The tribe holds an annual powwow late in June and a stomp dance every winter in late January. The Myaamia Center continues research directed by the Miami Tribe of Oklahoma to revitalize language and culture.

== History ==
The Miami Tribe of Oklahoma is an Indigenous people of the Northeastern Woodlands, who traditionally spoke the Miami-Illinois language, a language of the Algonquin family.

Miami society was divided into clans, led by hereditary chiefs. They had a patrilineal system of kinship, with descent and inheritance passing through the paternal lines. Children were considered born into their father's clans but clan mothers were highly influential who had approval over hereditary chiefs.

They constructed villages with long houses, occupied by related families. The Miami were farmers and were known for developing a unique type of white corn. Traditionally, they played double ball, the moccasin game, and darts.

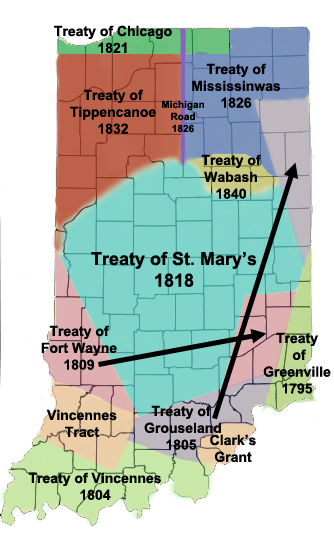
Miami treaties in Indiana

Like all tribes who had reservations in what became Oklahoma, in the late 19th century the Miami endured their communal lands being broken up by the Dawes Act, which allotted land to individual households with the thought to encourage assimilation as farmers. In practice, it resulted in the loss of much tribal land, as speculators took advantage of the Miami. Similarly, the Curtis Act of 1898 ended tribal government and the federal Bureau of Indian Affairs became an intermediary administration.

The Miami persevered and in the 1930s, they re-organized their own tribal government under the Oklahoma Indian Welfare Act, independent of the Peoria people. The Miami ratified their constitution on August 16, 1939, which established a representative government with elected council and chief. In 1996, the Miami Tribe of Oklahoma changed its constitution to permit any descendant of people on certain historical roles to join, and since then hundreds of Indiana-based Miami have become citizens. Today the Oklahoma-based Miami tribe has more than 7,000 enrolled citizens.

On February 5, 2014, Rep. Markwayne Mullin (R, OK-2) introduced the bill To revoke the charter of incorporation of the Miami Tribe of Oklahoma at the request of that tribe (H.R. 4002; 113th Congress) into the United States House of Representatives. The bill would accept the request of the Miami Tribe of Oklahoma to revoke the charter of incorporation issued to that tribe and ratified by its citizens on June 1, 1940. The tribe has not been operating under the charter for the last several decades. The bill was scheduled to be voted on by the House on June 23, 2014. The Department of the Interior testified that they had no objection to the charter being revoked saying that the "decision whether to maintain or revoke such a charter ultimately should be the Tribe's."

In January 2015, the Miami Tribe of Oklahoma built a cultural resources office in Fort Wayne, Indiana, which will include providing services to tribal citizens who live in Indiana.

The Miami Tribe of Oklahoma has ties with Miami University in Ohio.

== Notable tribal citizens ==
- Daryl Baldwin, language revitalization
- Katrina Mitten, beadwork artist

== See also ==
- Miami Nation of Indiana
