= Katrina Mitten =

American artist

- Born: 1962; Huntington, Indiana
- Known for: textile art, beadwork
- Website: katrinamitten.com

Katrina Mitten (born 1962, Huntington, Indiana) is a Native American artist. She is enrolled in the Miami Tribe of Oklahoma, while also living in Indiana all her life.

Mitten is beadwork artist, whose embroidery style of beadwork has earned her numerous awards for over 50 years and has been featured in major metropolitan museums.

== Biography ==
Mitten is a descendant of one of the five Miami families who were allowed to stay after the establishment of the Indian Removal Act by Andrew Jackson. This act was passed to remove Native people from their land and relocate west, past the Mississippi River.

At the age of twelve, Mitten learned beading from her grandmother Josephine. Josephine influenced a large portion of Mitten's works, including her 1950s handbag, which she has stated represents her family heritage. Mitten made this handbag collaborating with her granddaughter Saiyer Miller and teaching her using the same methods as her grandmother.

Mitten also learned more about her tribe by visiting museums and studying her families' heirlooms. She is active on the powwow circuit.

She has created utilitarian works, such as The Cradle Board, as well as necklaces, bracelets, and beaded handbags. Other influences in her art include the geometric designs found in ribbonwork and the floral patterns depicted throughout the Great Lakes tribal beadwork. She incorporates personal and family stories into her art pieces and uses her art as a means of story telling.

In 2016 Mitten collaborated with Native American artists Katy Strass and Angela Ellsworth to create a painting of the states on a fiberglass statue of a bison.

Two of her pieces, MMIW (Missing and Murdered Indigenous Women) and Ten Original Clans of the Myaamia, were acquired by the Smithsonian American Art Museum as part of the Renwick Gallery's 50th Anniversary Campaign.

== Select artworks ==
- Cradle Board
- 1950's Handbag
- MMIW (Missing and Murdered Indigenous Women)
- Ten Original Clans of the Myaamia

== Exhibitions ==
- Native Art Market at the National Museum of the American Indian, Washington, D.C. (2014)
- Myaamia Heritage Museum & Archive (2018)
- Santa Fe Indian Market

== Collections ==
Mitten's artwork is held in the permanent collections of:

- Eiteljorg Museum of American Indians and Western Art
- Smithsonian's National Museum of the American Indian
- Smithsonian American Art Museum
- Wylie House Museum at Indiana University: Bloomington
