= Rosalyn LaPier =

Rosalyn LaPier is a Native American traditionally trained ethnobotanist, writer, professor and environmental historian. She is an enrolled member of the Blackfeet Tribe of Montana and Métis.

== Early life and education ==
Rosalyn LaPier was born in 1964 in Montana, and is the daughter of late William LaPier, Sr. and Angeline Wall of Browning, Montana. She was heavily influenced by her grandmother, Annie Mad Plume-Wall, and great aunt Theresa Still Smoking, who taught her about plants and medicine knowledge. LaPier says she learned vital knowledge and indigenous science from her grandmother as they travelled to Great Falls for their grocery shopping which was passed down the generation. She says that one way of conserving memory is through stories. Her grandmother Annie Mad Plume-Wall was a Blackfeet scientist and doctor with knowledge of plants including fungi and lichen, and she even taught Rosalyn to take soil in her hands and breathe it in deeply to ascertain the amount of tannin that was in the roots of a medicinal plant.

LaPier has a bachelor's in physics from Colorado College, a master's in liberal studies from DePaul University, and a doctorate in environmental history from University of Montana.

== Career ==
LaPier taught at Native American Educational Services College, a community based tribal college, and at the Piegan Institute which is non profit for the preservation of research of Native American Languages on the Blackfeet reservation in Montana, and for which she raised more than $4,000,000.00 for their programs. She was motivated to return to school for her Ph.D. by her community elders and attended University of Montana to study environmental history.

LaPier taught environmental studies as an associate professor at the University of Montana. In 2016 LaPier was selected for fellowship teaching as a visiting professor in the departments of Women's studies, environmental studies and Native American religion at Harvard Divinity School.

In 2022, she became a history professor at the University of Illinois at Champaign-Urbana. She is also a Research Associate at the National Museum of Natural History, Smithsonian Institution. LaPier teaches about the intersection of traditional ecological knowledge (TEK) which was first conceived by Manitoba-based professor Fikret Berkes in his 1999 book "Sacred Ecology" as three tenets which are knowledge passed down through generations, how that knowledge is used for their daily living and their belief. LaPier is serving as a Fellow in Garden and Landscape Studies at Dumbarton Oaks, a research center, library and garden of Harvard University in Washington, DC for the 2023–2024 academic year.

Her work, both academic, written and activism, has been beneficial to the national science community in an area that has been ignored and has raised an important viewpoint in a country that usually dismisses ideas that are not western research and practice. She argues that western scientists working in the United States have a unique American lens through which they see their work and because of this they remain blind different traditional approaches to the conservation and restoration of the environment.

LaPier is the chair board member for March for Science. She is the only Native American to receive the George M. Dennison Presidential Faculty Award for Distinguished Accomplishment in 2018.

== Books ==
LaPier co-authored a book with David R. M. Beck, City Indian: Native American Activism in Chicago, 1893-1934, under CBS Open Journal in 2015. It won the Robert G. Athearn Book Award in 2016.

Two years later, she published, Invisible Reality: Storytellers, Storytakers and the Supernatural World of the Blackfeet. This book received the John C. Ewers and Donald Fixico book awards from the Western History Association. This made her the first indigenous author to receive an award for a book solely written by them.

== Activism ==
LaPier served on the National Environmental Justice Advisory Council (NEJAC) for two terms (2013 - 2019), which is a Federal Advisory Committee to the US Environmental Protection Agency (EPA). She also served on NEJAC's Youth Perspectives on Climate Change Work Group to address environmental justice issues. She co-founded Saokio Heritage, a community based organisation which raises the voices of indigenous women writers and activists. LaPier also worked to stop coal removal in the Rocky Mountains in the Blackfoot territory (her commentary on "Mountain Removal Threatens Traditional Blackfoot territory,"in High Country News). She is working on strengthening Public policy for Indigenous languages with the National Coalition of Native American Language Schools and Programs, believing that indigenous languages is environmental knowledge of a community.

== Personal life ==
She is married and has two grown daughters.
