= One Who Walks with the Stars =

Ogala Lakota warrior

One Who Walks With the Stars (also translated as Walks with Stars Woman or Woman-Who-Walks-with-the-Stars) was an Oglala Lakota woman who fought against General Custer's men at Big Horn.

She was the wife of Crow Dog, a Brulé Lakota warrior.

== Battle of the Little Big Horn ==
She killed two soldiers by slashing and clubbing them in the water of the river bank during the Battle of Little Big Horn. Lawson (2007) writes that "Although Crow Dog did not kill anyone during the battle, his wife, One-Who-Walks-with-the-Stars, killed two soldiers who were attempting to swim across the river."

According to survivors of Little Big Horn, one of these killings took place while One Who Walks With the Stars was rounding up stray cavalry horses in woodland near the Brulé camp. Seeing one of Custer's men crawling through the brush in an attempt to reach the river, she took a piece of driftwood and clubbed him to death.

== See also ==
- Buffalo Calf Road Woman
- Minnie Hollow Wood
- Moving Robe Woman
- Pretty Nose
