= Do-Hum-Me =

Native American entertainer (1825–1843)

Do-Hum-Me (c. 1825–March 9,1843) was a Sauk woman who performed at P. T. Barnum's Barnum's American Museum in Manhattan with her husband, Cow-Hick-Kee, shortly after the couple married in 1843. She was the daughter of the Sauk chief Nan-Nouce-Push-Ee-Toe. She quickly became popular for both her performances and the obvious affection she and her husband showed one another, which contemporary writers frequently remarked upon. She died only four to six weeks after her marriage, at about 18 years of age, probably from a communicable illness such as influenza. Her burial at Green-Wood Cemetery in Brooklyn attracted widespread attention, and her monument became one of the cemetery's best-known landmarks. Her grave was later written about by Walt Whitman and inspired Carlos D. Stuart's poem Dohummee.

== Early life ==
Do-Hum-Me was the daughter of the chief of the Sauk Native American tribe. According to her gravestone, her father's name was Nan-Nouce-Push-Ee-Toe. Some sources state that her mother died when Do-Hum-Me was seven years old, and Nan-Nouce-Push-Ee-Toe raised her with great love and affection.

== Career ==
In 1843, she accompanied her father in a trip to Princeton, New Jersey for treaty negotiations. While there, she met and fell in love with a young member of the Iowa tribe named Cow-Hick-Kee. They married in Philadelphia, and soon thereafter were employed by P. T. Barnum's American Museum in Manhattan, performing ceremonial Native American dances.

A contemporary writer, Lydia Maria Child, wrote about Do-Hum-Me at length, and described Do-Hum-Me as "a very handsome woman, with a great deal of heart and happiness in her countenance". Many authors wrote about her, and many referred to what may have been part of her stage name - "The Productive Pumpkin".

Do-Hum-Me was popular, not merely for her performances, but also because onlookers were delighted by the tenderness between her and her young husband.

== Death ==
Within weeks of her marriage, Do-Hum-Me became ill and died March 9, 1843 at about 18 years of age after arriving in New York City to perform at P. T. Barnum's Barnum's American Museum. Literary scholar Jennifer Greiman has suggested that she most likely died from a communicable disease such as influenza.

The writer Lydia Maria Child, who had met Do-Hum-Me shortly before her death, believed that her illness resulted from the sudden changes in environment she experienced after leaving her Sauk homeland. Child wrote that Do-Hum-Me slept beside hot anthracite fires, then ventured into the cold winter air before performing in crowded, poorly ventilated theatres and saloons. She also observed that many members of the Indigenous delegation became ill at the same time, and argued that such illnesses often affected Indigenous people more severely than white Americans.

After her death, Do-Hum-Me was buried in Green-Wood Cemetery in Brooklyn. The cemetery donated her burial plot, while P. T. Barnum paid for her gravestone. Contemporary accounts described her father, Nan-Nouce-Push-Ee-Toe, and her husband, Cow-Hick-Kee, as overcome with grief during the funeral. Her grave monument featured a bas-relief of a weeping Indigenous warrior carved by the sculptor Robert E. Launitz and has been described as one of the earliest carved statues created for an American cemetery. Her grave became the best known and most frequently visited in the cemetery.

Do-Hum-Me continued to be remembered long after her death. The poet Walt Whitman later wrote about her grave, and Carlos D. Stuart commemorated her in his poem Dohummee.
