= Ione Band of Miwok Indians =

Federally recognized tribe of Miwok people in Amador County, California

Total population
- 750

Regions with significant populations
- United States (California)

Languages
- English, historically Plains Miwok language

Related ethnic groups
- other Miwok tribes

The Ione Band of Miwok Indians is a federally recognized tribe of Miwok people in Amador County, California. As of the 2010 census the population was only 5.

== Government ==
The Ione Band conducts business outside of their territory on the Ancestral Lands of the Southern Hill Nisenan Ancestral Territory, from Plymouth, California, which is very unusual. The tribe is led by a council that took over the historical council, as a move by Amy Dutschke from the BIA. The current tribal administration is as follows.

- Chairperson: Sara Dutschke Setshwaelo.
- Vice Chairman: Tracy Tripp.
- Secretary: Christine Hendricks.
- Treasurer: Sandra Waters
- Member at Large: George Gurion.

== History ==
Miwok people lived in over a hundred villages along the Sacramento and San Joaquin Rivers, as well as north of the San Francisco Bay area east into the foothills of the Valley Floor. Ione Miwok oral history says the tribe comes from the Buena Vista Peaks, south of Ione, California, when the Sacramento Valley was covered by water.

European contact came in the 19th century, when Spanish explorers descended upon Miwok lands. They enslaved thousands of Native Americans during the mission system period. Smallpox and other epidemics hit the Miwok between 1820 and 1840, which drastically reduced the Native American population. Before the Spanish first landed on California soil, there were about 22,000 Miwoks within the region; today there are about 750.

John Sutter built his fort in 1839 and continued enslaving Indians. He raided around Ione. The 1848–50 California Gold Rush brought an onslaught of non-Native people into the region. This massive inflow of people seeking fortune lead to settlers invading their land in the Sierra foothills; many of their hunting and gathering areas were then occupied. This led to extremely violent and even deadly clashes between the immigrants and the Indians.

Spurred by the violence created by the newcomers onto Indigenous Californians' lands, the United States federal government negotiated three treaties with the Southern Hill Nisenan Headsman, at the Nisenan Central Hub of Yoemet, along the Forks of the Cosumnes River. The US Congress never ratified the treaties, and the public did not learn about them until 1905. They were pushed off their ancestral lands and denied human rights or protection. This forced the Native people into homelessness.

A 1915 Bureau of Indian Affairs (BIA) census revealed 101 homeless Miwok people living around Ione. These would become the Jackson Rancheria, Buena Vista Rancheria, and Ione Band of Miwok Indians. The US tried and failed to create a 40-acre Indian rancheria for the Ione Miwok. Families settled on the land, and finally in 1972, the land was awarded to 12 individuals and other members of the Ione Miwok, but not collectively to the tribe. Negotiations and legal struggles over land ownership and tribal recognition continued for decades.

In 1994, Ada Deer wrote that the Ione Band of Miwok Indians was in fact recognized by the federal government. The Ione Miwok elected a tribal council in 1996. They ratified a constitution that was approved by the BIA in 2002 and held another election in 2003.

In 2012, the BIA approved an application by the tribe to put 228 acres of land in Amador County in trust.

In 2015, two court cases were settled in favor of the Ione Band of Miwok Indians allowing the 228.04-acre transfer to proceed.

== Language ==
The Miwok people lived peacefully for thousand of years throughout large portions of Northern and Central California. Originally, they were constituted of three main groups, which included: the Sierra Miwok, Lake Miwok, and Coast Miwok. Traditional territory of their ancestors included Central California. The languages they have been classified as speaking Northern Miwok and Plains Miwok languages have been grouped in the Utian language family. Most of them still live in Central California today on "Rancherias", which are similar to reservations. Today, the Miwok people speak English, but in the past they spoke their native "Miwok language", also known as Moquelumnan. Some elders still remember words from the language and younger people also take an interest in learning/speaking their native language again. However, overall, it is an endangered language.

== Culture and economy ==
Traditionally, each Miwok band was led by a chief?, who was typically a male. In some bands, chiefdom was hereditary and other clans elders would choose who would be the preceding chief. The Miwok tribe was made up of hunters, gatherers, and fishers. Their diets included acorns that could be made into various dishes such as soups, cakes, and bread. They hunted deer, black bear, elk, fowl, and small game such as rabbits, fish or quail. They also collected a number of foods available to them such as buckeye nuts, berries, mushrooms, and other greens. The weapons they used included spears, slings, knives, clubs, and bows and arrows. Their traditional clothing incorporated loincloths woven from grass or bark fibers and animal hides, fur robes, and kilts during the colder seasons for the men. Women traditionally wore front/back aprons created from the shredded willow bark, and their dresses usually were about calf length decorated with ornaments, tassels, shells, and quills. Like the men, they too wore fur robes in the winter and both genders wore moccasins during the cold weather and men would normally be barefoot if warm enough outside. More ceremonial attire consisted of headdresses, flicker headbands, that were made of the longest and narrowest flicker quill wing feathers. The colors were dark pink or yellow and sewn together with darker brown feathers to create the headband that would be tied from the back. Their styles also included body adornments; most of them wore ear and nose embellishments. They also practiced tattooing and developed the white paint from chalk deposits and the black from charcoal. This resulted in the black and white face and body painting that was often applied in horizontal lines. These tattoos and body adornments made the Miwok tribe very unique and distinctive. In the past, the Miwoks lived in tule houses that were usually made up of cone-shaped frames of wooden poles placed over a hold that is dug into the ground. The frame would be covered by mats woven by tule reeds and were kept insulated by packing dirt over it. Today, they live in modern houses/apartments. The children of the Miwok used to have many chores and little time to play. Today they commonly go hunting or fishing with their fathers. Back then, a popular game for free time was "shinny". This is an athletic game much like rugby and lacrosse. The younger children played a "skipping stone" game, which is similar to the game "jacks". Miwok girls also played with dolls, just like young girls commonly do today. Their culture heavily ties with their sacred ceremonies and beliefs. They commonly prayed and offered thanks to their spirits. They believed everything in the world obtained a spiritual power, such as plants, animals, rocks, and trees. Therefore, they often only took what they needed and did not like to waste anything from their sacred land. They held high respects for animals and showed this through their imitation dances and mythical legends about the animals and their people's connection. Dancing was very important to them and they performed in many occasions: when giving thanks, celebrating, and also in hopes of curing for the sick as well as prayers for the dead. They had musical instruments that consisted of elderberry flutes, drums, cocoon rattles, clappers, and whistles. As for economics, Coast and Lake Miwok used clamshell beads. They often traveled west to gather marine sources such as clamshells and seaweed. Today, the Ione Band is still seeking future establishment of a gambling facility (casino) ON Nisenan Ancestral Land, in Plymouth, California. The Ione Band's casino is in support of the tribe's government operations, programs, and general tribal members with the revenue from the casino. Furthermore, The Ione Band is actively searching for future economic development to help the tribe.

== See also ==
- Miwok people
- Sierra Miwok
- Andrea Delgado-Olson
