= Paula Underwood =

American author

- Born: Priscilla Marie Underwood; 1932; Los Angeles, California
- Died: 2000 (aged 67–68)
- Other names: Paula Underwood Spencer
- Citizenship: American
- Occupation: author
- Known for: Author of several award-winning books and "learning stories"

Priscilla Marie "Paula" Underwood (1932–2000) was an American author, who primarily wrote about Native Americans in the United States.

== Career ==
Underwood wrote several award-winning books and contributed to numerous publications. A speaker, lecturer, and teacher, she founded and directed the Learning Way company, a developer of an educational program: The Past is Prologue. She is known for her "learning stories" and "The Learning Way." Underwood's Learning Stories and Past is Prologue educational program were designated an Exemplary Educational Program by the US Department of Education and promoted by Sopris West in the Educational Programs that Work catalogue. This program was proven to assist educators in reaching the citizenship goal from Goals 2000: Every adult American will be literate and will possess the knowledge and skills necessary to compete in a global economy and exercise the rights and responsibilities of citizenship.

== Background ==
Underwood was born in Los Angeles, California to Perry Leonard Underwood, from Lincoln, Nebraska and Vida Lora (Webster) Underwood, from Springfield, Missouri.

In "Franklin Listens When I Speak," Underwood extensively details her lineage and the source of her oral history. She stated her paternal great-great-grandmother was originally Oneida. Her paternal grandmother was Sarah Mariah (Leonard) Underwood (1858–1939) born in Clarke County, Iowa. Franklin Listens When I Speak contains exhaustive research for contemporaneous documentation of Iroquois input into the drafting of the US Constitution, and has been used in lesson plans for high school students studying the US Constitution and the Iroquois Great Law of Peace.

Subsequent to The Walking People's 1993 publication, there have been numerous discoveries presaged in that volume. For example, in 2005, an excavation in Parker, Colorado found a 5,000 year old "long house." Underwood had detailed the People's initially envisioning and creating long houses while living in what was likely present-day Colorado many centuries ago. Additionally, at the time of The Walking People's publication, scientific belief was that Homo sapiens did not co-exist with any smaller stature hominid species. The Walking People details interactions with such an individual. In 2003, Homo floresiensis was found.

== Works ==
- Who speaks for wolf: a native American learning story as told to Turtle Woman Singing by her father, Sharp-eyed Hawk
- The Walking People: a Native American oral history, 1993
- Three strands in the braid: a guide for enablers of learning, 1993
- Winter white and summer gold: a Native American learning story, 1994
- Many circles, many paths: a Native American learning story, 1994
- Franklin listens when I speak: tellings of the friendship between Benjamin Franklin and Skenandoah, an Oneida chief, 1996
