= Moving Robe Woman =

Hunkpapa Lakota soldier

- Tȟašína Máni

Personal details
- Born: c. 1854
- Died: 1935 (aged 80–81) Standing Rock Reservation, South Dakota
- Parent(s): Father, Crawler. Mother, Sunflower Face.
- Known for: Fought against Custer during the Battle of Little Big Horn to avenge her brother, One Hawk
- Nickname(s): Mary Crawler, Her Eagle Robe, She Walks With Her Shawl, and Walking Blanket Woman

Moving Robe Woman (Lakota: Tȟašína Máni) was a Hunkpapa Lakota woman who fought against General George Custer during the Battle of Little Big Horn to avenge her brother, One Hawk, who had been killed. She was known by many other names including Mary Crawler, Her Eagle Robe, She Walks With Her Shawl, Walking Blanket Woman, Moves Robe Woman, Walks With Her Robe and Tashenamani

== Early life ==
Moving Robe Woman was born near the area now called Grand River, South Dakota. Her father's name was Crawler; he was also known as Siohan and was the Hunkpapa band chief, also present at the battle. Her mother was Sunflower Face. At the age of 17, Moving Robe Woman traveled to Montana with a war party to battle against the Crows. When she was about 22 years old, she and her family moved to Peji Sla Wakapa, known in English as the Little Big Horn.

== Battle of Little Big Horn ==
When she was 23, she heard news from her parents that her brother was killed by Pehin Hanska (the Lakota name for Custer) and his soldiers. Shortly thereafter, a troop of soldiers charged on horseback into the large Lakota village near the Greasy Grass River and began firing their guns. Later in the battle an Oglala Lakota warrior named Fast Eagle claimed that he had held Custer's arms while Moving Robe Woman stabbed him in the back. However, several other warriors claimed to have killed Custer, and it is uncertain that Moving Robe Woman actually killed him. There are no published post-mortem accounts that describe Custer as having stab wounds, and officers who found his body described him as having died of gunshot wounds.

She also avenged her brother's death by killing two of Custer's men, one with a knife and the other with a revolver. The latter was the army interpreter Isaiah Dorman.

== Later years ==
After the battle of the Little Bighorn, she moved with her people to Canada, where she remained until 1881. She then moved to the Kenel area of Standing Rock. The Standing Rock Family Information Survey notes that in 1923 at age 70, Moving Robe Woman was living alone in a one room log house with a connected barn on the Grand River west of Bullhead, South Dakota. The survey also noted that she owned 18 horses and 23 cattle.

== Interview ==
An interview with Moving Robe Woman, made at Fort Yates, North Dakota by Frank B. Zahn, is published in Richard G. Hardorff's book, Lakota Recollections of the Custer Fight, New Sources of Indian-military History. In the interview she describes her emotions upon hearing of her brother's death at Little Big Horn:

"My Heart was bad. Revenge! Revenge! For my brother's death. I thought of the death of my young brother, One Hawk. I ran to a nearby thicket and got my black horse. I painted my face with crimson and braided my black hair. I was mourning. I was a woman, but I was not afraid."

== Visual representations ==
She was photographed in later life by F.B. Fiske; the photograph by Fiske is held in the National Anthropological Archives of the Smithsonian Institution.

The American artist Thom Ross has created a 200-piece installation of the battle, including a painting of Moving Robe Woman.

== See also ==
- Buffalo Calf Road Woman
- Minnie Hollow Wood
- One Who Walks With the Stars
- Pretty Nose
