= Mark Soldier Wolf =

Arapaho tribal elder

Mark Soldier Wolf

Mark Soldier Wolf (born 1927 or 1928 – died 2018) was an Arapaho tribal elder and storyteller.

Soldier Wolf was born in 1927 or 1928 to Scott Dewey. He was raised on the Wind River Indian Reservation by his grandmother. Soldier Wolf's great-grandmother was the war chief Pretty Nose who participated in the Battle of Little Big Horn in 1876. In his youth, Soldier Wolf was forced to attend American Indian boarding schools. He stated that the memories of the boarding schools were "bad memories, dark stories. They didn't teach us, they trained us. They didn't teach us, they just kept us in line." Years later, he was part of a tribal delegation that participated in the repatriation of the remains of three Native American children who had died at the Carlisle Indian Industrial School.

Soldier Wolf was drafted in to the US Marine Corps in 1948. An accident in the Korean War ruptured his eardrum and he was discharged in 1952. On his return to Wind River, Soldier Wolf was greeted by his 101-year-old great grandmother, Pretty Nose, wearing the tribal cuffs that showed she was a war chief. He worked with horses and sheepherding and married Florita, daughter of Richard Brown. Before the Northern Arapaho Tribe had an official historic preservation officer, Soldier Wolf acted as an informal historian for the group, assisted by his daughter Yufna who would later become the director of the Northern Arapaho Tribal Historic Preservation Office. Soldier Wolf provided Arapaho names for people, including all of his grandchildren, which are revealed during the official naming ceremonies.

In the documentary Wolf Nation produced by Victoria Costello, Soldier Wolf led the Arapaho members in a traditional wolf dance to welcome the return of wolves to Yellowstone National Park. Soldier Wolf explains the significance of the wolf to Native American cultures in the 2003 documentary Wolf: An Ancient Spirit Returns. He was also a performer in the documentary Celebration! : the Plains Indian Museum powwow.

As one of the Arapaho representatives, Soldier Wolf signed an agreement with Arapahoe High School in Colorado that gave approval for the school to use the tribe's name, in exchange for the school promising to educate its students about the Arapaho people and culture. On NPR, Soldier Wolf explained "What makes it OK here, it helps advertise to the world who the Arapahoes are because there's hardly anything written about the Arapaho."
