= Andrea Delgado-Olson =

Native American computer scientist

- Education: Mills College
- Occupation: Computer scientist

Andrea Delgado-Olson is a computer scientist, founder of Native American Women in Computing (NAWiC), and a member of the Ione Band of Miwok Indians. She is the chief operating officer of technology startup ZaaWink.

== Early life ==
Delgado-Olson grew up in Orinda, California, near Oakland, and is the daughter of a financial business manager and the Director of the San Francisco Bay Area field office for the Office of Special Counsel. She looked up to her mother, who served a role model to her as an attorney in a male-dominated field. Beginning her education at a community college, Delgado-Olson got her teaching certificate and taught preschool for 15 years. After going on to complete her bachelor's degree she continued at Mills College to obtain her master's degree in computer science.

== Career and impact ==
Delgado-Olson founded Native American Women in Computing (NAWiC) in 2014, a community supporting indigenous women in tech. She is currently the Program Manager for Systers and GHC Communities at Anita B.org, an online community for women in computing.
