= Deborah A. Miranda =

Native American writer, poet, and professor of English (born 1961)

Deborah Miranda
- Born: October 22, 1961 (age 64); Los Angeles, California
- Education: Ph.D., English
- Alma mater: University of Washington
- Occupations: Poet, Professor
- Spouse: Margo Solod
- Children: Miranda and Danny
- Parent(s): Alfred Edward Robles Miranda and Madgel Eleanor (Yeoman) Miranda

Deborah A. Miranda is an American writer, poet, and professor of English at Washington and Lee University.

== Life, Education and career ==
Miranda attended Wheelock College with a focus on teaching moderate special needs children. After receiving her B.S., she earned her MA and Ph.D. in English from the University of Washington. She went on to become Thomas H. Broadhus professor of English at Washington and Lee University in Lexington, Virginia, where she taught creative writing, with a research interest in Native American culture. In her scholarship, Miranda explores the ways in which the American canon has repressed and subjugated Indigenous culture, while giving breath to other historically marginalized groups, such as the Chicanos and Chicanas, African Americans, Japanese Americans, Chinese Americans, Appalachians, Southern Americans, and more. In 2012, Miranda received a Lenfest Sabbatical Grant for her project "The Hidden Stories of Isabel Meadows and Other California Indian Lacunae". In 2015, she won a PEN Oakland/Josephine Miles Literary Award.

Miranda maintains a blog and Twitter account known as BAD NDNS, where she writes about her life, poetry, and essential histories.

== Published work ==
=== Books ===
One of Miranda's major works is Bad Indians: A Tribal Memoir (2013), in which she discusses the multiple time-frames and decades that the Esselen Nation and California Indians have dealt with. Also included in this memoir are Miranda's encounters with her family endeavors and actual news clippings and testimonies to emphasize the hardships felt at this time. Through these archival texts and her own personal testimony Miranda provides a unique exploration of the legacies of Indigenous genocide in California.

In 2017, Miranda was a co-editor of the two-spirit literature collection Sovereign Erotics. She is considered one of many important two-spirit writers working to reclaim buried histories of third genders from colonial erasure.

Other major books include:

- The Zen of La Llorona, Salt Publishing, 2005.
- Indian Cartography, Greenfield Review Press, 1999, Cover Art by Kathleen Smith (Dry Creek Pomo/Bodega Miwok)
- Altar to Broken Things, BkMk Press 2020.
- Raised By Humans, Tia Chucha Press 2015.

=== Poetry and essays ===
Miranda's poetry is widely anthologized, and she also writes scholarly articles tackling such issues as racism, colonialism, misogyny, intergenerational trauma, childhood trauma, identity, environmental crises, the political climate, and linguistic barriers. Some examples include:

- "Lunatic or Lover, Madman or Shaman: The Role of the Poet in Contemporary Culture(s)." Stealing Light: A Raven Chronicles Anthology. Raven Chronicle Press. 2018.
- "Tuolumne" in World Literature Today. May 2017.
- "What's Wrong with a Little Fantasy? Storytelling from the (still) Ivory Tower" in American Indian Quarterly, vol. 27, no. 1&2.
- "A String of Textbooks: Artifacts of Composition Pedagogy in Indian Boarding Schools." The Journal of Teaching Writing. Vol. 16.2, Fall 2000.
- "I Don't Speak the Language that has the Sentences: An Interview with Paula Gunn Allen" in Sojourner: The Women's Forum. February 1999, Vol. 24, No. 2.
- "A Strong Woman Pursuing Her God: Linda Hogan's Power" in Sojourner: The Women's Forum. November 2000, Vol. 26, No. 3.

== Personal life ==
Miranda is a descendant from what are known as "Mission Indians," Indigenous peoples of many Southern California tribes who were forcibly removed from their land into several Franciscan missions. She is a member of the Ohlone-Costanoan Esselen Nation, an organization that does not have federal recognition. She describes herself as "the daughter of an Ohlone–Costanoan Esselen Nation man with Santa Ynez Chumash tribal ancestry and an English, French, and Jewish woman from Beverly Hills."
