= Pamela Rae Huteson =

American poet

Pamela Rae Huteson (born 1957) is an Alaska Native author and illustrator, from Prince of Wales Island in Southeast Alaska. She is both Tlingit and Haida, of the Shungkweidi Eagle moiety, from the Wolf House.

Part Owner & DJ of the on-line ThunderCloud Radio, Home of the Hu-Haa Hitz. Featuring Native Hip Hop, Native R&B, & Native Reggae from Hawaii to Greenland.

She has collaborated with her son to produce a Tlingit culture app, Totem Stories, based on her book.

== Poetry ==
- Legends in Wood, Stories of the Totems (Tigard, Or: Greatland Classic Sales, 2002 ISBN 1-886462-51-8 )

== Publications containing Huteson's illustrations ==
- Legends in Wood, Stories of the Totems (Tigard, Or: Greatland Classic Sales, 2002 ISBN 1-886462-51-8 )
- Coloring Alaska, the Greatland on a Summers Day (Tigard, Or: Greatland Classic Sales, 2004)
- Transformation Masks (Hancock House Publications, 2007 ISBN 0-88839-635-X )

== Other publications containing her entries ==
- Encyclopedia of Anthropology. 2006. Entries: Aleut, Athabascan, Kwakiutl, Tlingit, Haida, Eskimo Acculturation, Potlatch, Feasts and Festivals. SAGE Publications
- Encyclopedia of Race, Ethnicity & Society. 2008. Entries: Aleut, Tlingit, Indigenous Canada, Alaska Native Legislations. SAGE Publications
- Encyclopedia of Time. 2009. Entries: Totems, Myths of Creation, Tribal Calendars, Chaco Canyon, Pueblo. SAGE Publications
- 21st Century Anthropology; A Reference Handbook. 2010. Entry: Inuit. SAGE Publications
