= Laura Tohe =

American Navajo writer, poet

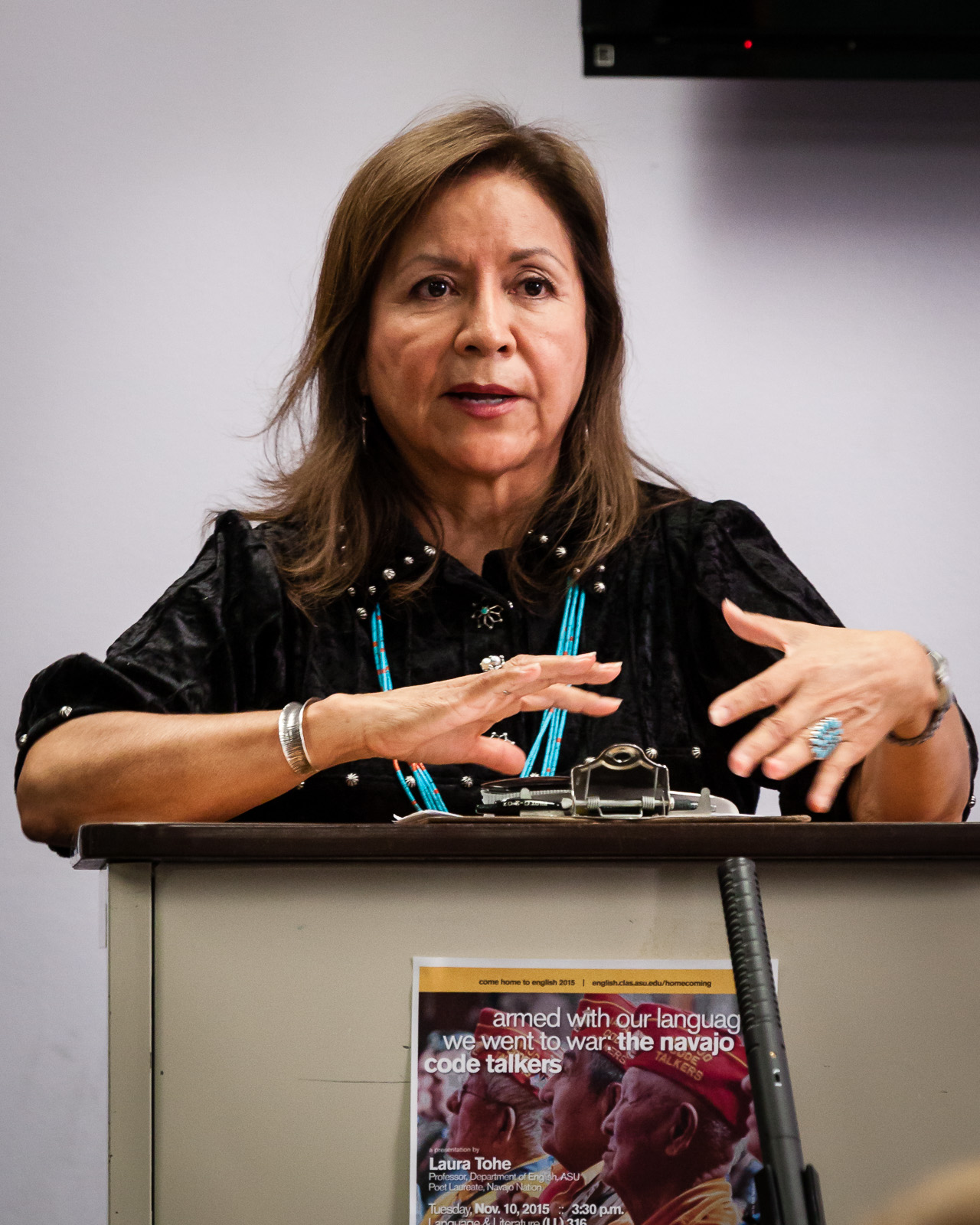
- Born: 1952 (age 73–74)
- Education: University of New Mexico, University of Nebraska–Lincoln (MA, Phd - Creative Writing and Literature)
- Writing career
- Notable awards: Festival of Words Writers Award (2019)

Laura Tohe (born 1952) is a Native American author and poet. She is poet laureate of the Navajo Nation for 2015–2019, and is a professor emerita of English at Arizona State University.

Tohe was born in Fort Defiance, Arizona, the daughter of a Navajo code talker. She grew up speaking both Diné bizaad/Navajo language and English and was punished in school for speaking her native language due to assimilation. She earned a B.A. from the University of New Mexico in 1975, an M.A. from the University of Nebraska–Lincoln in 1985, and a Ph.D. from the University of Nebraska–Lincoln in 1993. She has been affiliated with Arizona State University since 1994.

== Selected works ==
=== Books ===
- Making Friends with Water (Nosila Press, 1986)
- No Parole Today (West End Press, 1999)
- Tséyi' / Deep in the Rock: Reflections on Canyon de Chelly (with photographer Stephen E. Strom, University of Arizona Press, 2005)
- Code Talker Stories (Rio Nuevo Publishers, 2012)

=== Librettos ===
- Slayer, A Navajo Oratorio (With M. Grey, Naxos Digital Services US Inc. 2009)

== Awards ==
- "Tseyi, Deep in the Rock" won the Glyph Award for Best Poetry (2007)
- Navajo Nation Poet Laureate (2017)
