= L. Frank =

American artist, author, and activist from California

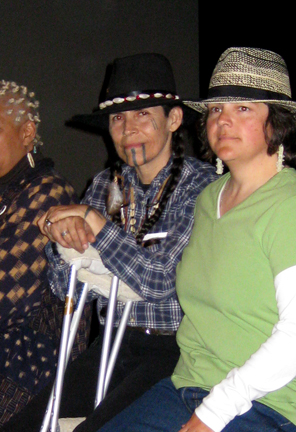
- L. Frank (left) with Navajo writer Reid Gómez
- Born: L. Frank Manriquez; 1952 (age 73–74)
- Known for: Basket weaving, illustration, painting, Indigenous language activism
- Patrons: News from Native California
- Website: crowsonthenose.com/aboutlfrank.html

L. Frank (born 1952) is the nom d'arte of L. Frank Manriquez, an American artist, writer, scholar, cartoonist, and activist for Indigenous languages from California. She lives and works in Santa Rosa, California.

== Art ==
In 1990, L. Frank was Artist in Residence at the Headland Center for the Arts in Sausalito, California; her artwork has been exhibited widely throughout California and appears in several publications.

== Publications ==
Her regular column/graphic, "Acorn Soup", has appeared in the quarterly newsletter News from Native California since 1992. "Acorn Soup" features the comic adventures of Coyote in his various guises: the Creator of the Universe and the Buffoon, the Trickster and the Tricked, always the Indian's Wise Fool. A selection of L. Frank's "Acorn Soup" cartoons have been collected and published in book form. Concerning L. Frank, one reviewer of the book at Amazon.com commented: "Introducing the Gary Larson of the Native American cartoon world!"

Another book, "First Families: Photographic History of California Indians" with co-author Kim Hogeland, was published in September 2006. It is an introduction to California's native populations, with pictures such as the re-creation and sailing of the tii'at (a traditional Tongva/Gabrieleño canoe) off Catalina Island in 1995, to the 1918 picture of Kumeyaay men performing a sacred funerary dance with karuk dolls, to an image from 1932 of Salinans leading anthropologist J. P. Harrington on an expedition along California's central coast. Each chapter covers a different region of California, with brief essays introducing the region's cultures, histories, and contemporary life.

== Community activism ==
She is a former board member of the California Indian Basketweavers Association and one of seven founding board members of the Advocates for Indigenous California Languages, organizations that are involved in the preservation and revival of Native Californian languages through traditional arts practice, language immersion, conferences and workshops.

She has won several awards for her activities, including from the American Association of University Women, the James Irvine Foundation, the Fund for Folk Culture (for travel to the Native Californian art collection at the Musée de l' Homme in Paris). In 1995 she was featured as a "Local Hero" in KQED-TV/Examiner Newspaper's Native American Heritage Month series. Frank is also active in the Two-Spirit culture educating and spreading awareness of issues.

In response to the Pope canonizing Juniper Serra, Frank with Corine Fairbanks and other activists held several publicized rallies to bring to light the detrimental affect that the mission system had on California Indians.

In 2016, Frank built a traditional Tongva tule boat for Northwest Journeys, an intertribal event in Washington state, which was highlighted on the KCET channel. In the fall of that year, she was a speaker on Native American rights and the protection of the Earth at the Dakota Pipeline protest. She stated the media's coverage of the event has been misconstrued. "We don’t want violence or perceived violence to be what’s on the media."

In June 2019, Frank was awarded the Alexis Arquette Family Foundation | LA Pride 2 Spirits Activist Award.
