= Ignatia Broker =

American writer and community leader

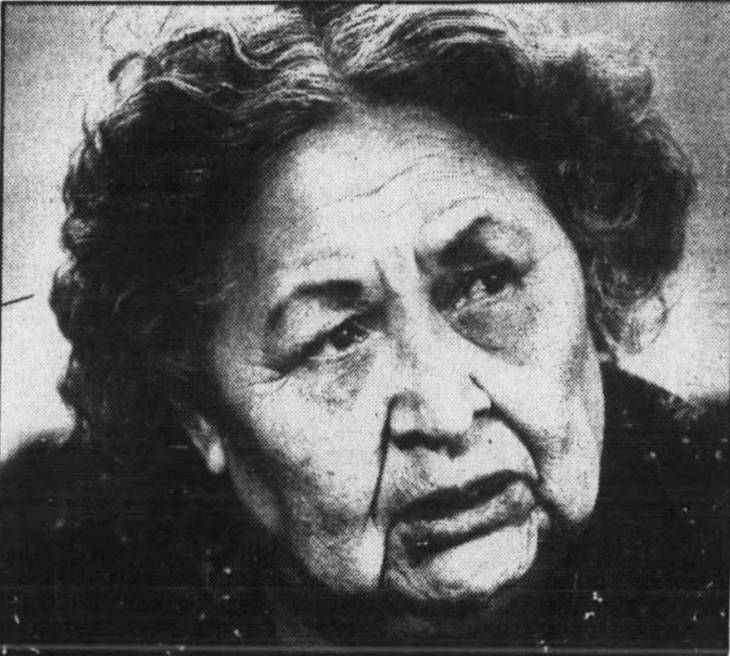
- Born: February 14, 1919 White Earth Indian Reservation in northwestern Minnesota
- Died: June 23, 1987 (aged 68) Minneapolis, Minnesota
- Occupation: Novelist

Ignatia Broker (1919–1987) was an Ojibwe writer and community leader from Minneapolis, Minnesota. She is best known for the novel Night Flying Woman, published in 1983, which tells the story of Broker's great-great-grandmother and her family's life before and after contact with white explorers. She was an enrolled member of the Ojibwe tribe and the Ottertail Pillager Band.

== Early and personal life ==
Broker was born on February 14, 1919, on White Earth Indian Reservation in northwestern Minnesota. She received her early education at Wahpeton Indian Boarding School in North Dakota--a federal Indian boarding school--and Haskell Institute in Kansas. In 1941 she moved to Minneapolis, Minnesota, later taking down with her a niece and nephew she "adopted." There, she would attend night classes and worked at a defense plant during World War II. She would describe the war years as unstable and wrote about her studies on the racial discrimination the Ojibwe community faced in Minneapolis. In the late 60s through to her death, Broker became involved with various Native American social advocacy groups, including the American Indian Center of Minneapolis.

== Work ==
Night Flying Woman, Broker's only novel, was published in 1983. In the preface, Broker writes that her motivation for the novel came partly from her own children, who wished to know more about the past experiences of the Ojibwe people. The theme of keeping the past alive through passing down stories in the oral tradition is important in the book. After opening the book with some details of Broker's own life, the story mostly focuses on the experiences of Broker's great-great-grandmother, Ni-bo-wi-se-gwa, or Oona, who lived from the 1860s to the 1940s. During that time, cultural contact with Euro-American society created various devastating changes, including removal from her tribe's traditional lands to the White Earth Indian Reservation, and the introduction of guns, alcohol, steel, missionaries, and smallpox, among many other alterations to traditional life. The book was considered notable, since the story was related by an Ojibwe storyteller and not a white historian.

== Death ==
Broker died of lung cancer on June 23, 1987.

== Awards ==
- 1984 Wonder Woman Award
