= Prudence Wright =

- Born: 26 November 1740; Dunstable, Massachusetts
- Died: 2 December 1824

Prudence "Pru" Cummings Wright (26 November 1740 – 2 December 1824) was a militia commander during the American Revolutionary War.

== Life ==
Born in Dunstable, Massachusetts, she was the daughter of Prudence and Samuel Cummings. She had two brothers who pledged allegiance to the crown (Samuel and Thomas) while her youngest brother Benjamin) was a Patriot; also two sisters (Mary and Sibbel). Her father was the town clerk. Prudence was a patriot, but many of her family members were loyal to the British crown. In 1761, she married David Wright, a private in the American militia, an ardent Whig, and strong believer in independence.

The two had eleven children—David, Prudence, Cummings, Mary, Wilkes, Caroline, Liberty, Deverd, Liberty, Artemas, and Daniel. Mary and the first Liberty did not survive childhood. She joined the Congregationalist church in 1770.

According to a legend printed in 1899, Wright was elected by the townsfolk to command a women's militia known as the Mrs. David Wright's Guard, based in Pepperell, Massachusetts. The group consisted of about 30 or 40 local Patriot women, whose husbands were mostly members of the regular militia ordered to march towards Boston after the Battles of Lexington and Concord. The women dressed in their husbands' clothes and carried "anything that would serve as a potential weapon", including pitchforks. Wright appointed Sarah Hartwell Shattuck of Groton, Massachusetts, as her lieutenant and began organizing patrols of the town and the surrounding area. The two directed the arrest of loyalist spies (two of Wright's own brothers) at Jewett's Bridge over the Nashua River in April 1775.

Wright and her group apprehended Captain Leonard Whiting of Hollis, New Hampshire—a noted Loyalist—as he passed the bridge on horseback. He was held prisoner overnight in a Pepperell tavern before being moved to Groton where he was taken into custody. Based on a family legend, Wright's brother, Samuel Cummings, was with Whiting on the day of his capture, but he turned back once he sighted his sister in arms at the bridge.

Although women were not to be paid for militia service, in 1777 the town convened a committee to compensate Mrs. David Wright's Guard (whom they called Leonard Whiting's Guard) for their actions. Leonard Whiting was a British Army officer and a friend of the two arrested spies.

On March 19, 1777, Prudence Wright's guard was paid 7 pounds, 17 shillings, and sixpence by the Town of Pepperell's Committee of Estimation. The Town Meeting Minutes referred to her guard as Leonard Whiting's Guard because women could not overtly be paid for services performed during the revolution.

== See also ==
- Anne Bailey
- Margaret Corbin
- Mary Ludwig Hays
- Molly Pitcher
- Anna Maria Lane
- Deborah Sampson
- Sally St. Clair
