= Women in the United States Army =

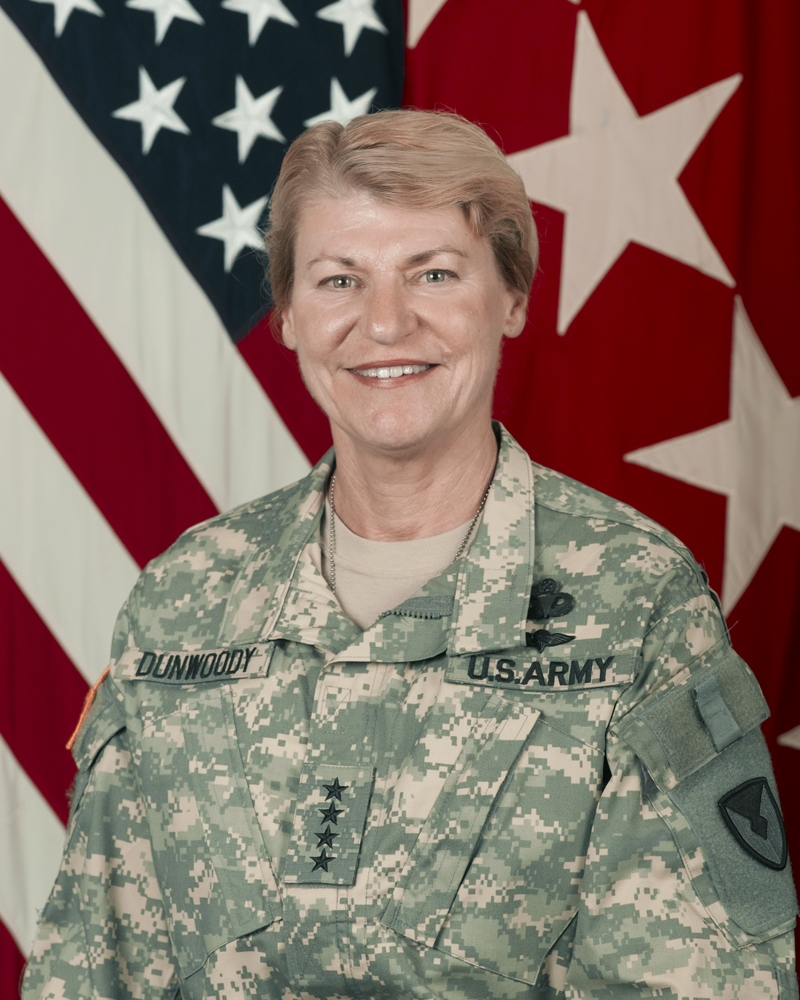
Ann Dunwoody became the first female four-star general in the United States Army in 2008; this also made her the first female four-star general in the United States military.

There have been women in the United States Army since the Revolutionary War, and women continue to serve in it today. As of 2020, there were 74,592 total women on active duty in the US Army, with 16,987 serving as officers and 57,605 enlisted. While the Army has the highest number of total active duty members, the ratio of women-men is lower than the US Air Force and the US Navy, with women making up 15.5% of total active duty Army in 2020.

== History ==
Note that some minor wars women served in have been omitted from this history.

=== Pre-World War I ===
A few women fought in the Army in the American Revolutionary War while disguised as men. Deborah Sampson fought until her sex was discovered and she was discharged, and Sally St. Clair died in the war. Anna Maria Lane joined her husband in the Army; her pension notes that she was given $100 a year for life in recognition of the fact that she, "in the Revolutionary War, performed extraordinary military services at the Battle of Germantown, in the garb, and with the courage of a soldier."

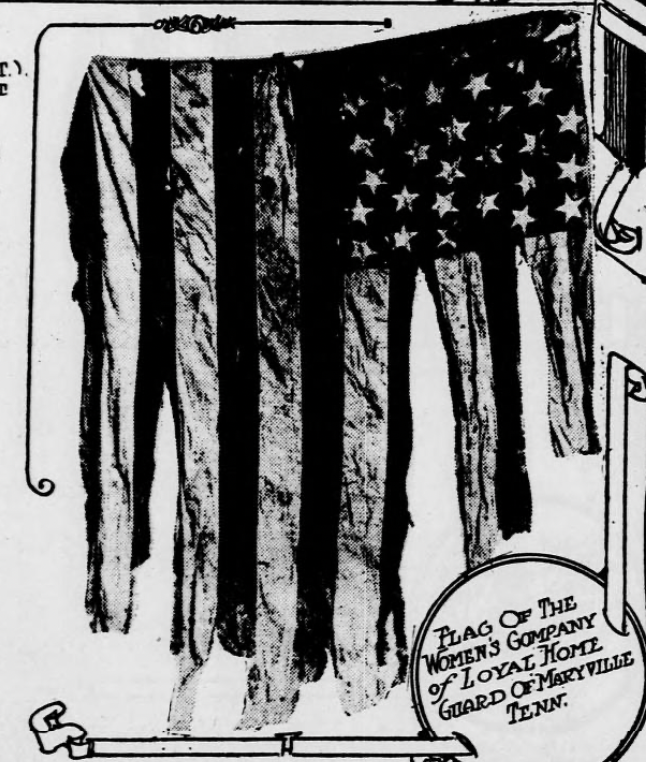
Maryville, Tennessee all female Home Guard flag, 1862

The number of women soldiers in the American Civil War is estimated at between 400 and 750, although an accurate count is impossible because the women again had to disguise themselves as men.

Dr. Mary Edwards Walker became the first female surgeon in the US Army when she was appointed as Assistant Surgeon of the 52nd Ohio Infantry serving in the Battles of First Bull Run, Fredericksburg, Chattanooga, and Chickamauga. Walker was also the first and to this day the only woman to ever receive the Medal of Honor.

The United States established the Army Nurse Corps as a permanent part of the Army in 1901; the Corps was all-female until 1955.

=== World War I ===
Approximately 21,000 women served in the Army Nurse Corps during World War I. In 1917 World War I Army nurses Clara Ayres and Helen Wood became the first female members of the U.S. military killed in the line of duty. They were killed on May 20, 1917, while with Base Hospital #12 aboard USS Mongolia en route to France. The ship's crew fired the deck guns during a practice drill, and one of the guns exploded, spewing shell fragments across the deck and killing Nurses Ayres and Wood.

Hello Girls was the colloquial name for American female switchboard operators in World War I, formally known as the Signal Corps Female Telephone Operators Unit; during World War I, these switchboard operators were sworn into the U.S. Army Signal Corps. However, not until 1978 did Congress approve veteran status/honorable discharges for the remaining Hello Girls. The Hello Girls were created in 1917 due to a call by General John J. Pershing to improve the worsening state of communications on the Western front. Applicants had to be bilingual in English and French to ensure that orders would be heard by anyone. Over 7,000 women applied, but only 450 women were accepted. Many of these women were former switchboard operators or employees at telecommunications companies.

=== World War II and after until the Korean War ===
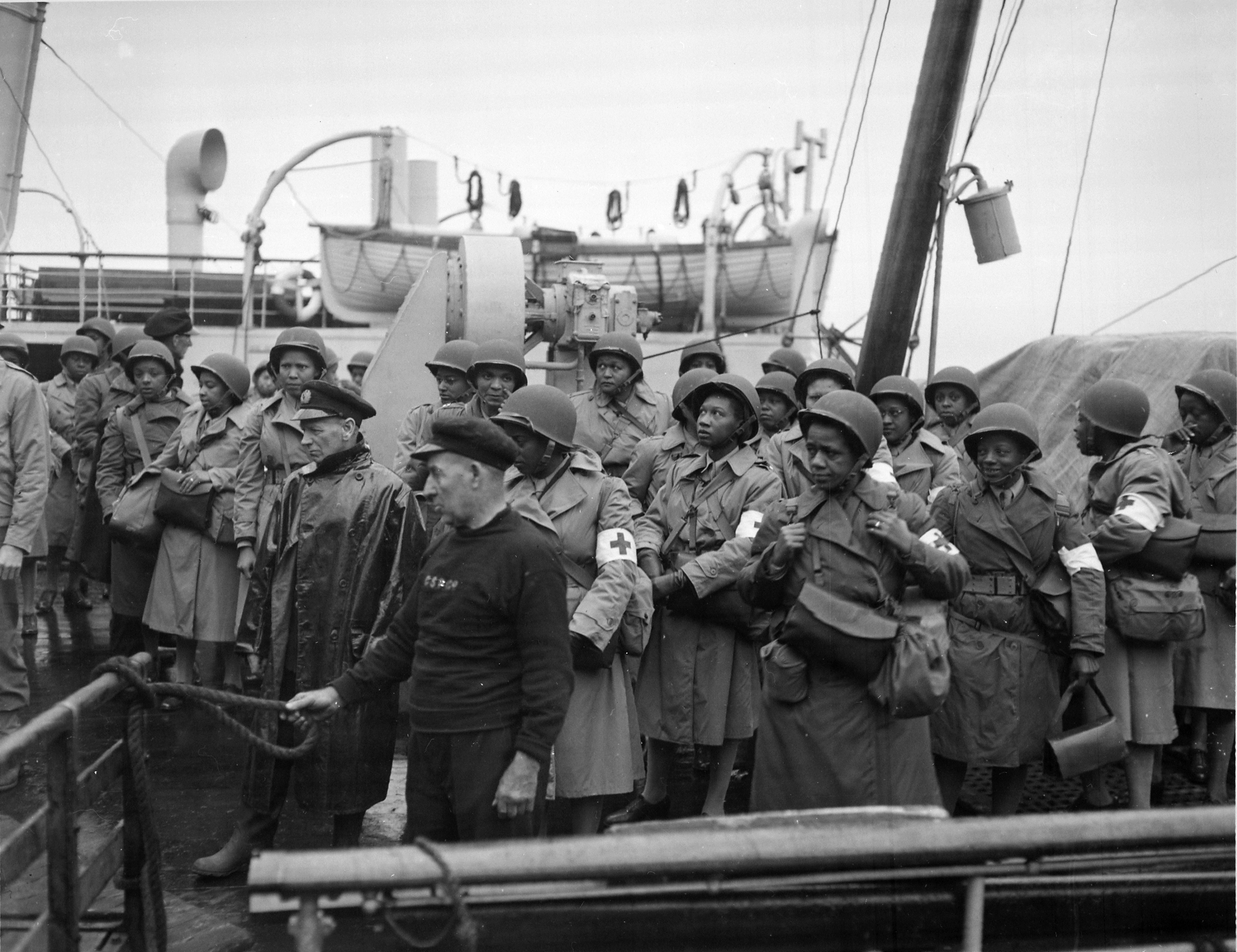
US Army NACGNs line the rail of their vessel as it pulls into Greenock, Scotland in August 1944

The Army established the Women's Army Auxiliary Corps in 1942, which was changed to the Women's Army Corps in 1943. Oveta Culp Hobby was the first WAC and its first director. Over 150,000 women served as WACs during World War II. Women from every ethnicity would serve in the WACs including the first African-American officer Lt. Col. Charity Adams Earley, Asian-Americans like Cpl. Ruth Chan Jang, the first Puerto Rican WAC - Tech 4 Carmen Contreras Bozak and navite Americans like Cpl. Grace Thorpe.

The Angels of Bataan (also known as the "Angels of Bataan and Corregidor" and "The Battling Belles of Bataan") were the members of the Army Nurse Corps (and the Navy Nurse Corps) who were stationed in the Philippines at the outset of the Pacific War (a theatre of World War II) and served during World War II's Battle of the Philippines (1941–42). When Bataan and Corregidor fell to the Japanese in 1942, they, 66 army nurses (and 11 Navy nurses and 1 nurse-anesthetist) were captured and imprisoned in and around Manila. They continued to serve as a nursing unit throughout their status as prisoners of war. They were freed in February 1945.

In January 1943, Captain Frances Keegan Marquis became the first to command a women's expeditionary force, the 149th WAAC Post Headquarters Company. Serving in General Eisenhower's North African headquarters in Algiers, this group of about 200 women performed secretarial, driving, postal, and other non-combat duties.

In May 1943, Dr. Margaret Craighill became the first female doctor to become a commissioned officer in the Army Medical Corps; she was assigned as the Women’s Consultant to the Surgeon General of United States Army commanding the Women’s Health and Welfare Unit and liaison duty with the WAC. During her military service, she was responsible for inspection of the field conditions for all women in the United States Army. This included providing medical care after enlistment, and recommending hygiene courses and other preventative measures, as well as establishing the standards for screening applicants into the WACs and for WAC medical care. She also met with a board of army doctors to create set standards of acceptability, and these were shortly published. Craighill was also responsible for advising the assignment of women medical officers. She recommended that women be assigned positions that were based on their professional qualifications rather than on their gender.

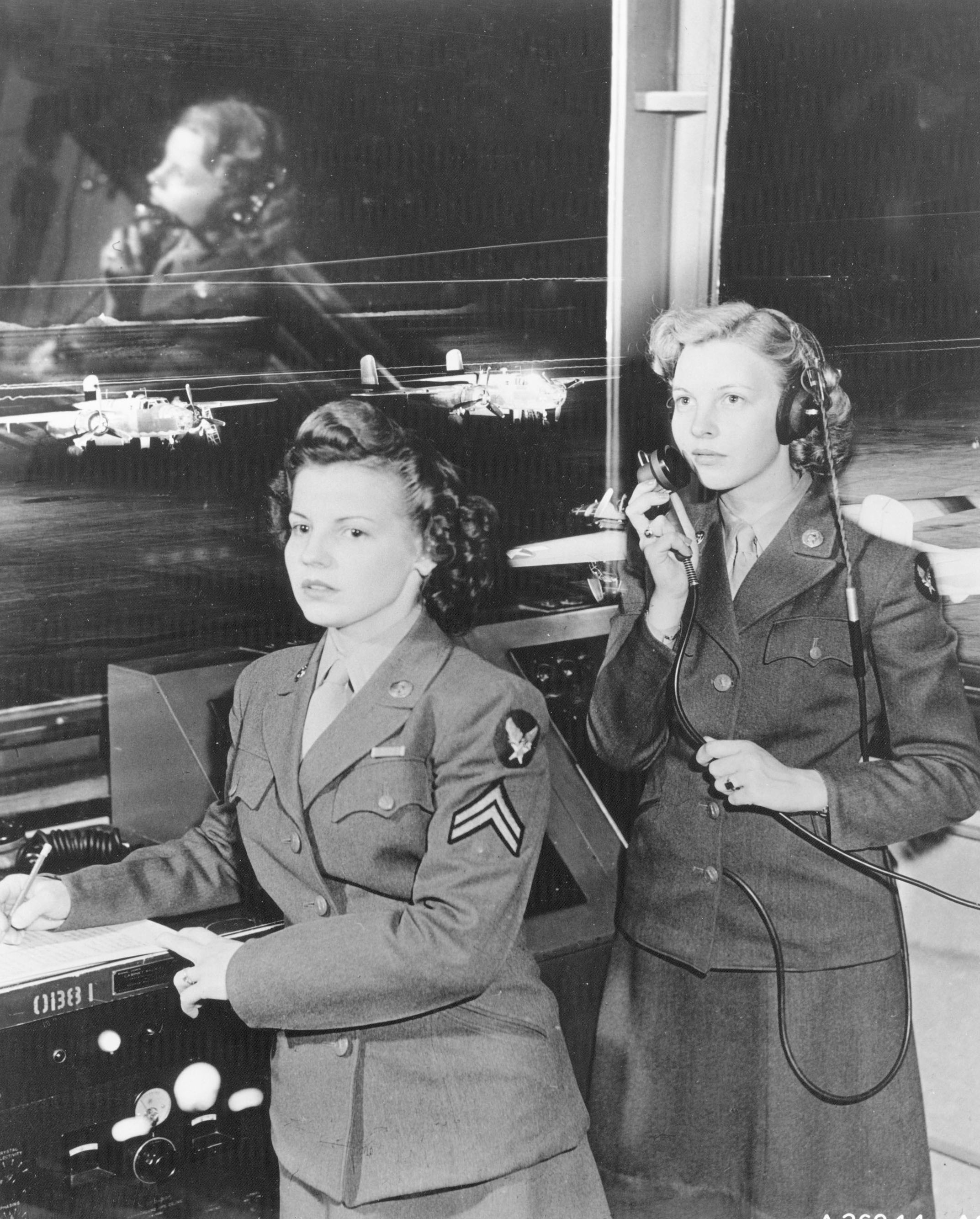
Women's Army Corps, Randolph Field, Texas, 1944

The United States Army Surgeon General's office issued a circular in 1941 that for the first time classified "homosexual proclivities" as disqualifying inductees from military service; the WAC adopted a similar policy in 1944. The WAC instituted strict screening policies for candidates, based on physical appearance and gender and femininity conformity, in order to exclude lesbians from service. WAC policies also condoned heterosexual relationships with servicemen in order to discourage homosexual conduct.

Slightly after the war, in 1947, Florence Blanchfield became the first woman to receive a military commission in the regular army.

In 1948, the Women's Armed Services Integration Act gave women permanent status in the Regular and Reserve forces of the Army.

=== Korean War and after until the Vietnam War ===
Army women who had joined the Reserves following World War II were involuntarily recalled to active duty during the Korean War. Although no Women's Army Corps unit was sent to Korea, approximately a dozen WACs, including one officer, served in Seoul and Pusan in secretarial, translator, and administrative positions in 1952 and 1953. As well, many WACs served in support positions in Japan and other overseas locations. Over 500 Army nurses served in the combat zone and many more were assigned to large hospitals in Japan. One Army nurse died in a plane crash on her way to Korea on July 27, 1950, shortly after hostilities began.

=== Vietnam War ===
In 1967, during the Vietnam War, Public Law 90-130 was signed into law; it removed legal ceilings on women's promotions that had kept them out of the general and flag ranks, and dropped the two percent ceiling on officer and enlisted strengths for women in the armed forces. Women's Army Corps soldiers served in the Vietnam War; at their peak in 1970, WAC presence in Vietnam consisted of some 20 officers and 130 enlisted women.

During the war, Anna Mae Hays, Chief of the Army Nurse Corps, became the first U.S. female brigadier general on June 11, 1970. Minutes later, Elizabeth Hoisington, Director of the Women's Army Corps, became the second. An Army nurse (1st LT Sharon Ann Lane) was the only US military woman to die from enemy fire in Vietnam. Two other Army nurses were awarded the Soldier's Medal for heroism in Vietnam; one was African-American 1LT Diane Lindsay, who was the first black woman to receive the award.

=== Women in the Army from 1972 to 2025 ===
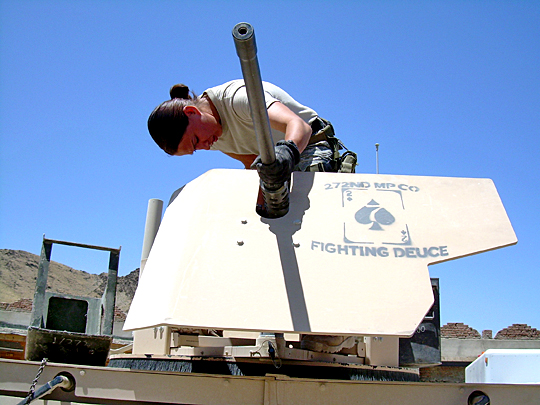
A female soldier maintaining her 50-caliber machine gun before undertaking a mission in Afghanistan in 2006

Frontiero v. Richardson, 411 U.S. 677 (1973), was a landmark Supreme Court case which decided that benefits given by the military to the family of service members cannot be given out differently because of sex.

West Point admitted its first 119 female cadets in 1976, after Congress authorized the admission of women to the federal service academies in 1975. Four years later 62 female cadets graduated, including the first two black female graduates, Joy Dallas and Priscilla "Pat" Walker Locke. In 1981, Debra Lopez Fix became the first Hispanic American woman to graduate from West Point. In 1984, Brigitte Wahwassuck Kwinn became the first native American woman to graduate form West Point. In 1989, Kristin Baker became the first female First Captain, the highest ranking senior cadet at the academy. Rebecca Marier became the academy's first female valedictorian in 1995.

In 1978, the Women's Army Corps was disestablished and its members integrated into the regular Army.

In 1980, Kate Wilder became the first woman to complete the Army's Special Forces Officer Course.

In 1983, 170 women in the Army were part of the United States invasion of Grenada as military police, munitions specialists, and signal operators.

In 1989, Dorothy Pocklington became the first female member of the Army Reserve to attain the rank of brigadier general.

The Gulf War involved the deployment of approximately 26,000 Army women. Two Army women were taken as POWs (Army Specialist Melissa Rathbun-Nealy and Maj. Rhonda Cornum).

Women in the Army served in the Afghanistan War that began in 2001 and ended in 2021, and the American-led combat intervention in Iraq that began in 2014 and ended in 2021.

Women in the Army served in the Iraq War from 2003 until 2011. During that war, Jessica Lynch was captured by Iraqi soldiers while she was serving in the Army; her subsequent recovery by U.S. special operations forces, on April 1, 2003. received considerable media coverage as it was the first successful rescue of an American prisoner of war since World War II and the first ever of a woman. Another female prisoner of war captured while serving in the Army during the Iraq War was Shoshana Johnson, a Panamanian-born American soldier, who was the first black female prisoner of war in the military history of the United States. As well, during the Iraq War Leigh Ann Hester received the Silver Star for her heroic actions on 20 March 2005 during an enemy ambush on a supply convoy near the town of Salman Pak, Iraq; this made her the first female U.S. Army soldier to receive the Silver Star since World War II and the first ever to be cited for valor in close quarters combat.

In all, since the terrorist attacks of September 11, 2001, more than 300,000 American women were deployed to Iraq and Afghanistan. According to the Washington-based Service Women’s Action Network (SWAN), a total of 166 women were killed in combat operations and more than 1,000 were injured.

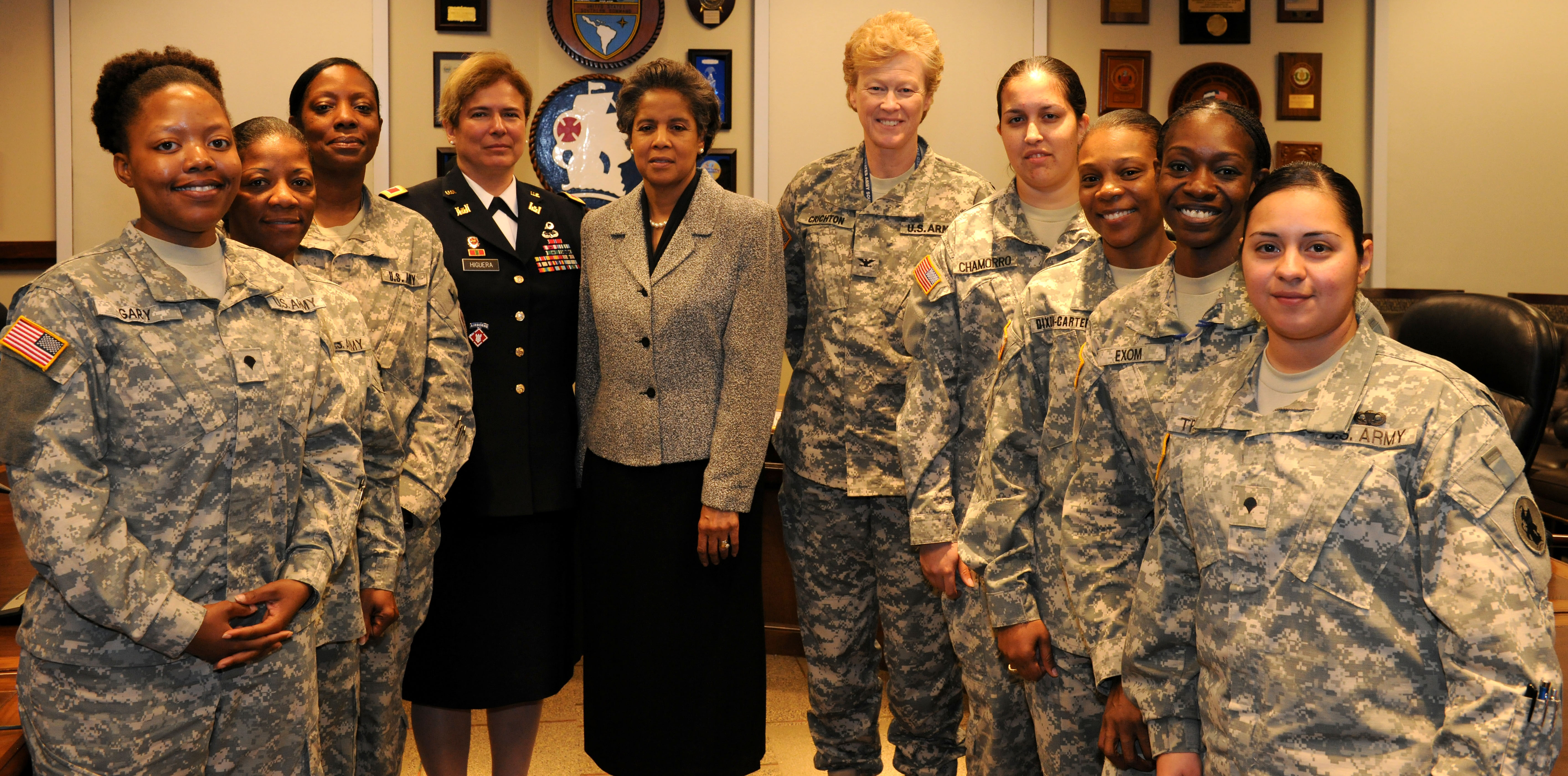
Army South celebrates women in the Army

In 2008, Ann Dunwoody became the first female four-star general in the Army; this also made her the first female four-star general in the military.

In 2011, Patricia Horoho became the first female Army surgeon general.

In August 2015, Kristen Marie Griest and Shaye Lynne Haver became the first two women to graduate from the US Army Ranger School. In October 2015, Lisa Jaster became the third woman to graduate from this school, and the first one from the Army Reserves. In April 2016, Griest became the first female infantry officer in the US Army when the Army approved her request to transfer there from a military police unit.

Brig. Gen. Diana Holland became West Point's first woman Commandant of Cadets in January 2016.

In April 2016, Tammy Barnett became the first woman to enlist in the infantry in the U.S. Army, and Kristen Marie Griest became the first female infantry officer in the U.S. Army when the U.S. Army approved her request to transfer there from a military police unit. In May 2016, Shelby Atkins became the first female U.S. Army noncommissioned officer to be granted the infantry military occupational specialty.

On October 26, 2016, ten women became the first female graduates from the United States Army's Infantry Basic Officer Leader's Course at Fort Benning, Georgia.

In 2017, eighteen women graduated from the United States Army's first gender-integrated infantry basic training for enlisted soldiers.

In 2019, Laura Yeager became the first woman to lead a US Army infantry division (specifically, the National Guard's 40th Infantry Division).

According to scholars, since at least as early as 1960, Executive Order 10450 was applied to ban transgender individuals from serving in the United States military. On May 17, 1963, gender transitioned or transitioning individuals were officially prohibited from the United States military by Army Regulation 40-501. This policy reasoned transgender people were medically unqualified to serve because their mental state was considered unfit. Later, after varying restrictions over the years, there stopped being restrictions on people serving in the military due to their being transgender when President Joe Biden signed the "Executive Order on Enabling All Qualified Americans to Serve Their Country in Uniform" on January 25, 2021. However, Executive Order 14183, titled "Prioritizing Military Excellence and Readiness", an executive order issued by President Donald Trump on January 27, 2025, again banned transgender people from military service. In March 2025, a federal judge blocked the Executive Order; but in May of that year the Supreme Court allowed the Trump administration to reinstate the ban while legal challenges continue in the Ninth Circuit.

In May 2021, Christine Wormuth became the first female United States Secretary of the Army. The Secretary of the Army is the civilian leader of the Army.

As of 2023, women made up 16 percent of the US military. Of these, more than 100 have graduated from the Army's rigorous Ranger School.

=== Women in the Army after 2025 ===
Women in the Army served in the 2026 Iran war. Notably, a woman in the United States Army Reserve, Nicole Amor, was one of the first six American service members killed in that war; the six were all killed in a strike in Kuwait on March 1, 2026.

== Policies ==
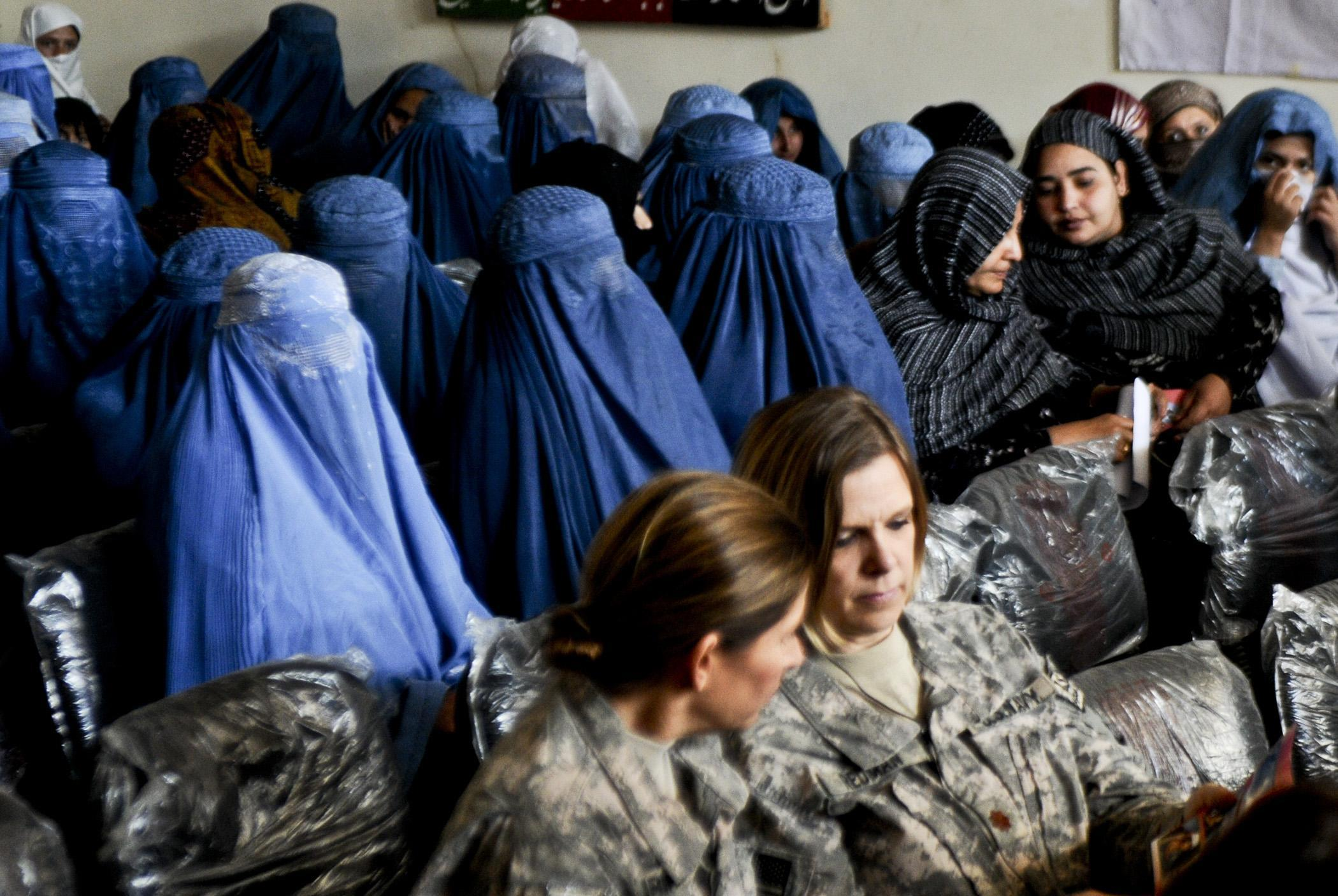
Women from the Kunar Provincial Reconstruction Team and Iowa National Guard’s 734th Agribusiness Development Team gather alongside Afghan women to celebrate International Women's Day at the Ministry of Information and Culture on March 8, 2011. More than 100 Afghan women from the surrounding areas attended the event.

In the case Doe v. Alexander (1981), which was about a transgender woman who had been rejected from the United States Army Reserve due to having had sex reassignment surgery, the Army defended their policy of denying enlistment to transsexual persons by stating that supporting transsexuals would raise a medical problem in the form of hormone supplements not always being available for such personnel.

Before the "Don't Ask Don't Tell" policy was enacted in 1993, lesbians and bisexual women were banned from serving in the Army since 1944 (see above). In 1993 the "Don't Ask Don't Tell" policy was enacted, which mandated that the military could not ask servicemembers about their sexual orientation. However, until the policy was ended in 2011 service members were still expelled from the military if they engaged in sexual conduct with a member of the same sex, stated that they were lesbian, gay, or bisexual, and/or married or attempted to marry someone of the same sex.

On April 28, 1993, combat exclusion was lifted from aviation positions by Les Aspin, permitting women to serve in almost any aviation capacity.

In 1994, the Pentagon declared:

Service members are eligible to be assigned to all positions for which they are qualified, except that women shall be excluded from assignment to units below the brigade level whose primary mission is to engage in direct combat on the ground.

That policy also excluded women being assigned to certain organizations based upon proximity to direct combat or "collocation" as the policy specifically referred to it. According to the Army, collocation occurs when, "the position or unit routinely physically locates and remains with a military unit assigned a doctrinal mission to routinely engage in direct combat."

In 2013, Defense Secretary Leon Panetta removed the military's ban on women serving in combat, overturning the 1994 rule. Panetta's decision gave the military services until January 2016 to seek special exceptions if they believed any positions must remain closed to women. The services had until May 2013 to draw up a plan for opening all units to women and until the end of 2015 to actually implement it.

In September 2015, Ranger School was permanently opened to women. By August 2019, 30 women earned their U.S. Army Ranger tab.

In December 2015, Defense Secretary Ash Carter stated that starting in 2016 all combat jobs would open to women.

In March 2016, Ash Carter approved final plans from military service branches and the U.S. Special Operations Command to open all combat jobs to women, and authorized the military to begin integrating female combat soldiers "right away."

According to scholars, since at least as early as 1960, Executive Order 10450 was applied to ban transgender individuals from serving in the United States military. On May 17, 1963, gender transitioned or transitioning individuals were officially prohibited from the United States military by Army Regulation 40-501. This policy reasoned transgender people were medically unqualified to serve because their mental state was considered unfit. Later, after varying restrictions over the years, there stopped being restrictions on people serving in the military due to their being transgender when President Joe Biden signed the "Executive Order on Enabling All Qualified Americans to Serve Their Country in Uniform" on January 25, 2021.

In February 2023, a set of new policies was established by the Department of Defense in order to support military members receiving abortions. Anyone who receives an abortion could travel out of a restrictive state and receive three weeks of administrative leave.

== Sexual assault ==
According to a report published in 2011, more women in the US military are sexually assaulted by their fellow soldiers than killed in combat. According to a Pentagon study released in May 2019, sexual assaults in the US military have increased sharply in the past two years, largely due to a 50% increase in assaults against women in uniform. According to United States Commission on Civil Rights report in 2013, a 2010 survey conducted by the United States Department of Defense found that 54% of women and 27% of men did not report assaults due to fear of retaliation or negative experiences after reporting.

== See also ==
- Aberdeen scandal
- Army Women's Museum
- Women in the military
- Women's Army Corps
- Women's Army Volunteer Corp
- Sexual assault in the United States military
