= Anna Maria Lane =

Female soldier in the Continental Army during the American Revolutionary War

Anna Maria Lane (c. 1755–1810) was the first documented female soldier from Virginia to fight with the Continental Army in the American Revolutionary War. She dressed as a man and accompanied her husband on the battlefield, and was later awarded a pension for her courage in the Battle of Germantown.

== Early life ==
Little is known about Anna Maria Lane's early life, though it is believed she may be from New Hampshire. By 1776, she had married John Lane.

== Wartime service ==
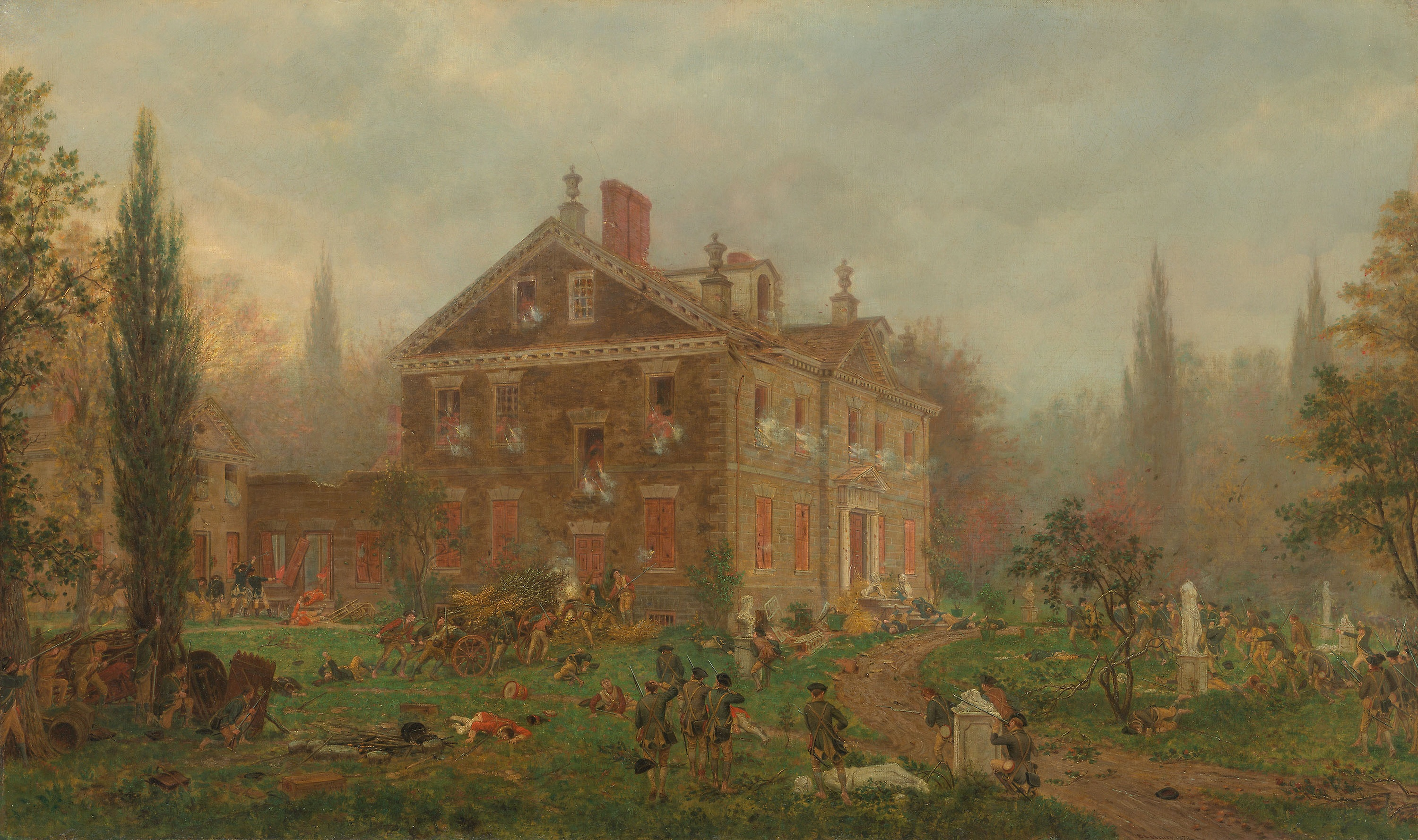
The Battle of Germantown

Lane and her husband John joined the Continental Army in 1776, and served initially under General Israel Putnam. Although some women accompanied the soldiers as camp followers during the American Revolution to help out as cooks, nurses or laundresses, Lane was the only documented woman in Virginia to dress as a man and fight on the battlefield. Historians have speculated that it probably wasn't difficult for Lane to pass as a man, because Revolutionary soldiers didn't bathe very often and slept in their uniforms. "As far as enlistment, there are no physicals when one enters the Army in the 18th century," said historian Joyce Henry, "One must have front teeth and an operating thumb and forefinger so one may be able to reach in, grab a cartridge, tear off the paper, and be able to successfully load your musket."

Lane and her husband fought in campaigns in New York, New Jersey, Pennsylvania, and Georgia. On October 3, 1777, they served under George Washington in the Battle of Germantown, near Philadelphia, where Anna Maria was severely wounded, which left her lame for life. Just before the Battle of Germantown, George Washington had issued an edict which forbade women "camp followers" from accompanying men to the battlefield, so some historians have suggested that Anna Maria did not want to receive treatment for her wound for fear of being discovered.

Despite her injury, Anna Maria continued fighting alongside her husband when he re-enlisted in the Virginia Light Dragoons. She was with him when he was wounded in the Siege of Savannah in 1779. They both served until 1781.

== Later life ==
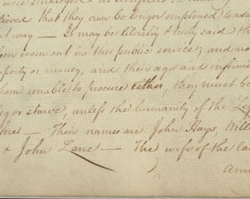
Letter from William Cabell about Anna Maria Lane

After the war ended in 1783, the Lanes settled down in Virginia. John Lane worked for a while at the state arsenal at Point of Fork in Fluvanna County. In 1801 the couple moved to Richmond, Virginia where he joined the Public Guard. They lived in the barracks of the Public Guard with their three children and received daily rations. In Richmond, Anna Maria volunteered to tend to soldiers at the military hospital. There, she met Dr. John H Foushee, who asked Governor James Monroe and the Council of State to authorize a small stipend for her nursing work.

Anna Maria Lane had apparently stopped working at the hospital by late 1804, since her name no longer appeared in the list of nurses in the council journal. In 1808, after Lane's husband and several other men were discharged from the public guard for disability, Governor William H. Cabell asked the General Assembly to give pensions to those disabled male soldiers, as well as a few women. Cabell specifically mentioned Anna Maria Lane, writing that she was "very infirm, having been disabled by a severe wound which she received while fighting as a common soldier, in one of our Revolutionary battles, from which she never has recovered, and perhaps never will recover." Her pension notes that Anna Maria Lane was given $100 a year for life in recognition of the fact that she, "in the Revolutionary War, performed extraordinary military services at the Battle of Germantown, in the garb, and with the courage of a soldier."

== Death and legacy ==
Lane died on June 13, 1810. It is not known when her husband John died. She did not become of interest to historians until the editor of the Richmond Magazine discovered her pension records and wrote an article about her in the 1920s. In 1997, the Virginia Sons of the American Revolution honored Anna Maria Lane by sponsoring a descriptive marker in Richmond, VA near the Bell Tower in Capitol Square, erected by the Department of Historic Resources.

== See also ==
- Anne Bailey
- Margaret Corbin
- Mary Ludwig Hays
- Molly Pitcher
- Deborah Sampson
- Sally St. Clair
- Prudence Wright
