= Mrs. David Wright's Guard =

- Active: April 1775
- Country: United States
- Allegiance: Patriots
- Type: All-woman militia
- Role: Guarded the Nashua River crossings
- Size: 30-40 women
- Garrison/HQ: Pepperell, Massachusetts
- Patron: Prudence Cummings Wright
- Engagements: American Revolutionary War

Commanders
- Current commander: Prudence Cummings Wright

Mrs. David Wright's Guard was an all-woman militia raised by the Patriots in Massachusetts during the American Revolutionary War. The Guard were an armed force of 30 to 40 women who guarded the Nashua River crossings to prevent the movement of Loyalist couriers.

== History ==
The Guard was raised in Pepperell, Massachusetts shortly after the outbreak of the American Revolutionary War in April 1775 and was composed entirely of women, the men having been called away to fight at the Battle of Concord. It was named after Prudence Cummings Wright, who formed the unit on her own initiative and was elected its first captain and commander. Wright was a 35-year-old mother of six whose husband David was a private in the Massachusetts militia. She was born in nearby Hollis, New Hampshire and was very familiar with the town; her father had been town clerk for 22 years and she visited regularly. She was visiting her mother in Hollis when she overheard her two brothers talking to Loyalist Leonard Whiting, and she discovered that he was planning to meet with British spies near Groton, Massachusetts; they were travelling from Canada and Whiting was to guide them to Boston.

Wright returned to Pepperell and hastily formed a militia from her female friends. She chose Sarah Shattuck from Groton to be her lieutenant, and the guard numbered between 30 and 40 women from the local area.

One night, the Guard were dressed in men's clothing and armed with guns and pitchforks, stationed at Jewett's Bridge over the Nashua River between Pepperell and Groton. They were hidden by a curve in the road and were able to surprise a horseman attempting to cross the river who proved to be Leonard Whiting. They captured him and found incriminating papers, and they detained him overnight in Solomon Rodgers' tavern in Pepperell. Whiting was delivered to the Groton Committee of Safety the next day. The papers were sent to the Committee of Safety in Cambridge, Massachusetts.

The militia was not paid by the state, as its members were all women. However a Pepperell town committee granted funds to the members of the Guard in 1777 in compensation for their service.

== Other known guard members ==
- Sarah Hartwell Shattuck (Mrs. Job Shattuck) 1738–1798. A103108, age 37, lieutenant. Buried at Groton.
- Mrs. Susanna Quailes, age 25 (3 Dec. 1749 - 28 Aug. 1775) Susanna lived only 11 days after the death of her 18 month old baby. Buried ar Groton.
- Elizabeth Hobart (age 17) (18 July 1753 - 21 January 1843) Centograph in Walton Cemetery, buried in Petersham, MA [daughter of Nehemiah Hobart, town clerk, selectman, & committee of correspondence: A#055896] Elizabeth later married Joseph Heald., Squire, town clerk, & Rep to General Court.
- Mrs. Jonathan Shattuck, also burned tea before the church door. Likely name = Abia[h]
- "Rebecca" Chamberlain Shattuck (22 April 1740 - 13 March 1817) Buried Woodlawn Cemetery, Pepperell, MA;
- A Great- Aunt of Capt. Phineas Adams, name unknown.
