= Laura Yeager =

Major General in United States army reserve

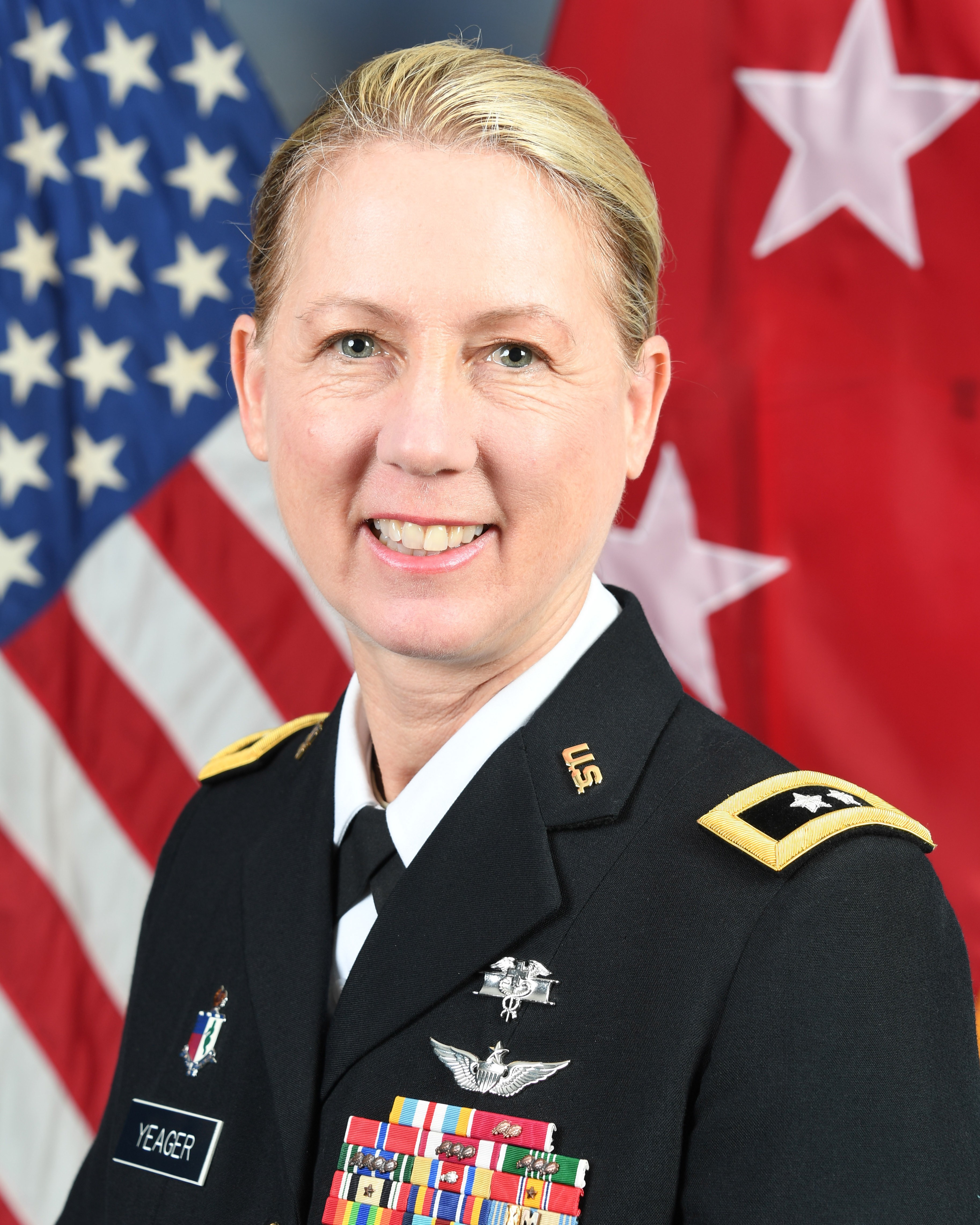
- Laura Yeager in 2019
- Born: Laura L. Brandt; 1963 or 1964 (age 62–63); Fountain Valley, California, US
- Children: 4
- Relatives: Curtis L. Yeager (m. 1988)
- Military career
- Branch: United States Army; Texas Army National Guard; California Army National Guard
- Service years: 1986–2022
- Rank: Major General
- Unit: United States Army Aviation Branch
- Commands: 40th Infantry Division; Joint Task Force North; 3rd Battalion, 140th Aviation Regiment
- Conflicts: Iraq War
- Awards: Defense Superior Service Medal; Legion of Merit (3); Bronze Star Medal

Major General Laura L. Yeager (née Brandt; born 1963 or 1964) is an active officer in the United States Army National Guard. She became the commander of the National Guard's 40th Infantry Division on June 29, 2019 and served in that role until May 15, 2022. She is the first woman to command a United States Army infantry division.

== Early life and education ==
Yeager was born and educated in Fountain Valley, California and is a 1982 graduate of Fountain Valley High School. Her father, Robert Brandt, is a retired army major general and a veteran of the Vietnam War. She attended California State University, Long Beach, where she joined the Army Reserve Officers' Training Corps to help pay for her college education. She has a bachelor's degree in psychology from the University of California, Irvine, and two master's degrees, one in marriage and family therapy from Chapman University and one in strategic studies from the United States Army War College.

== Military career ==
Yeager was commissioned a second lieutenant on May 30, 1986, after which she completed the Army Medical Department's Officer Basic Course. Her first appointment was as a platoon leader with the 423rd Medical Company. She completed training as a military helicopter pilot in 1989. She then flew Sikorsky UH-60 Black Hawk helicopters as an aeromedical evacuation pilot. After eight years, she left active duty as a captain when her first son was born. She joined the Army Reserve and later resumed her active military career in the California Army National Guard.

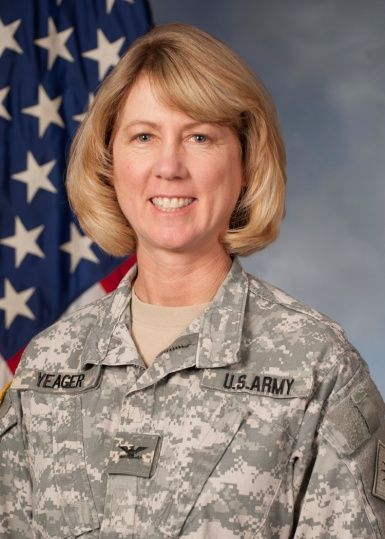
Colonel Laura Yeager, 2011

Yeager was promoted to major in December 1998, lieutenant colonel in 2004, and colonel in 2011. After several staff appointments, she commanded 3rd Battalion, 140th Aviation Regiment, at Stockton, California, between 2006 and 2008. In 2010–11, she saw service in Iraq as the deputy commander of the Guard's 40th Combat Aviation Brigade, based in Taji. On March 8, 2016, she was promoted to brigadier general. In 2017, she became Commander, Joint Task Force North, part of United States Northern Command, at Fort Bliss, Texas—the first woman in that position.

Yeager was promoted to major general on June 29, 2019 and assumed command of the Guard's 40th Infantry Division, a force of more than 10,000 soldiers. She became the first woman to command a United States Army infantry division; the change-of-command ceremony was held at the Joint Forces Training Base - Los Alamitos, California. She relinquished command of the division to her deputy, Major General Michael J. Leeney on May 15, 2022.

Yeager's awards and decorations include the Defense Superior Service Medal, Legion of Merit with two bronze oak leaf clusters, the Bronze Star Medal, the Meritorious Service Medal with three bronze oak leaf clusters, and various other achievement, campaign and service medals.

== Personal life ==
Since 1988, Yeager has been married to retired Lieutenant Colonel Curtis L. Yeager. They have four adult sons. She left active duty and entered the Army Reserve when their first son was born, saying it would be difficult for them both to be on active duty at the same time. When her husband retired, Yeager took a full-time position with the California National Guard. She has commented that, "As a female, I feel like the Guard and Reserve components are such a great way to serve and yet still have some good family-life balance." She was a member of Grizzly Gabbers from 2015 to 2019, a Toastmasters club based in Sacramento and sponsored by the California National Guard.

== See also ==
- Ann E. Dunwoody, first woman to achieve the rank of four star general in the United States military
- List of female United States military generals and flag officers
- Women in the United States Army
