= United States Army Women's Museum =

Museum in Virginia, United States

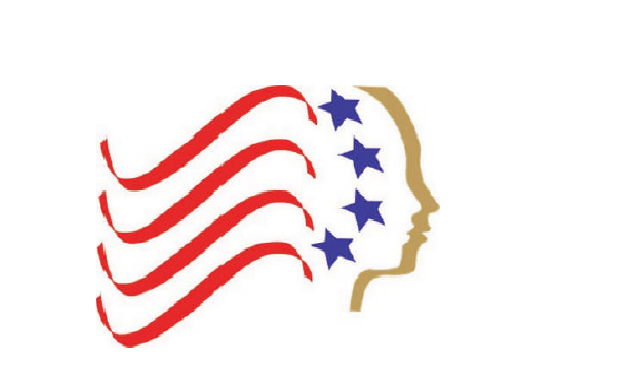

- Location within Virginia
- Former name: Women's Army Corps Museum
- Established: 1955
- Location: Fort Gregg-Adams, Virginia
- Coordinates: 37°14′36″N 77°20′46″W
- Type: Military museum
- Website: awm.army.mil

The United States Army Women's Museum is an educational institution located in Fort Gregg-Adams, Virginia. It provides exhibits and information related to the role of women in the United States Army, especially the Women's Army Corps. It is the only museum in the world dedicated to the women of the United States Army.

== History ==
The museum was originally established in 1955 as the Women's Army Corps Museum in Fort McClellan, Alabama. In 1961, the museum was renamed to the Edith Nourse Rogers Museum in honour of the woman who introduced the bill which established the Women’s Army Auxiliary Corps (WAAC) in 1942. It was renamed back to the Women’s Army Corps Museum in 1977. When Fort McClellan closed in 1999, the museum was relocated to Fort Lee and reopened in 2001 as the U.S. Army Women's Museum. In November 2013, the museum became the site of the first statue of a female soldier on a US Army installation.

One of the current and ongoing projects of the museum is the collection of oral histories of women who have served in the Army. The museum currently has over 100 histories in its collection and continues to gather oral histories from female servicemembers.

The mission of the U.S. Army Women's Museum is to collect, preserve, research, exhibit and interpret historically significant properties related to service of women across all branches and organizations of the United States Army from inception to present day. A secondary purpose of the museum will be to support military training and education of women through its exhibitions, publications, educational programs, and outreach activities.

In 2024, the museum created an online archive called Digital Collections which is accessible to the public. The museum is supported by the U.S. Army Women’s Foundation and the non profit "Friends of the Army Women’s Museum Association".

== See also ==
- History of women in the military
- Women in the United States Army
