= Debra Lopez Fix =

- Born: Elgin, Texas
- Spouse: Col. Robert Fix
- Children: 2
- Military career
- Branch: United States Army
- Service years: 1981–2011
- Rank: Colonel
- Known for: First Hispanic American woman to graduate from West Point
- Awards: Purple Heart

Debra Lopez Fix was the first Hispanic American woman to graduate from the U.S. Military Academy at West Point in 1981.

== Military career ==
Debra Lopez was born in Elgin, Texas and entered West Point in 1977, in the second ever class to allow female cadets. After graduating, she became both airborne and air assault qualified and was stationed at Fort Campbell, Kentucky with the 101st Airborne Division.

She was at the Pentagon during the September 11 attacks, serving with the 30th Adjutant General Battalion. Lt. Col. Fix was wounded in the attack and was awarded the Purple Heart.

Fix served in Iraq during Operation Iraqi Freedom with the U.S. Army Human Resources Command.

Fix retired in 2011, after 30 years of service, as a Colonel.

She married fellow soldier Col. Robert Fix (West Point Class of 1981) and they have two sons Joe and Bobby, both officers in the U.S. Army.
