= Mary Hays (American Revolutionary War) =

Woman soldier in American Revolutionary War

Mary Hays McCauley
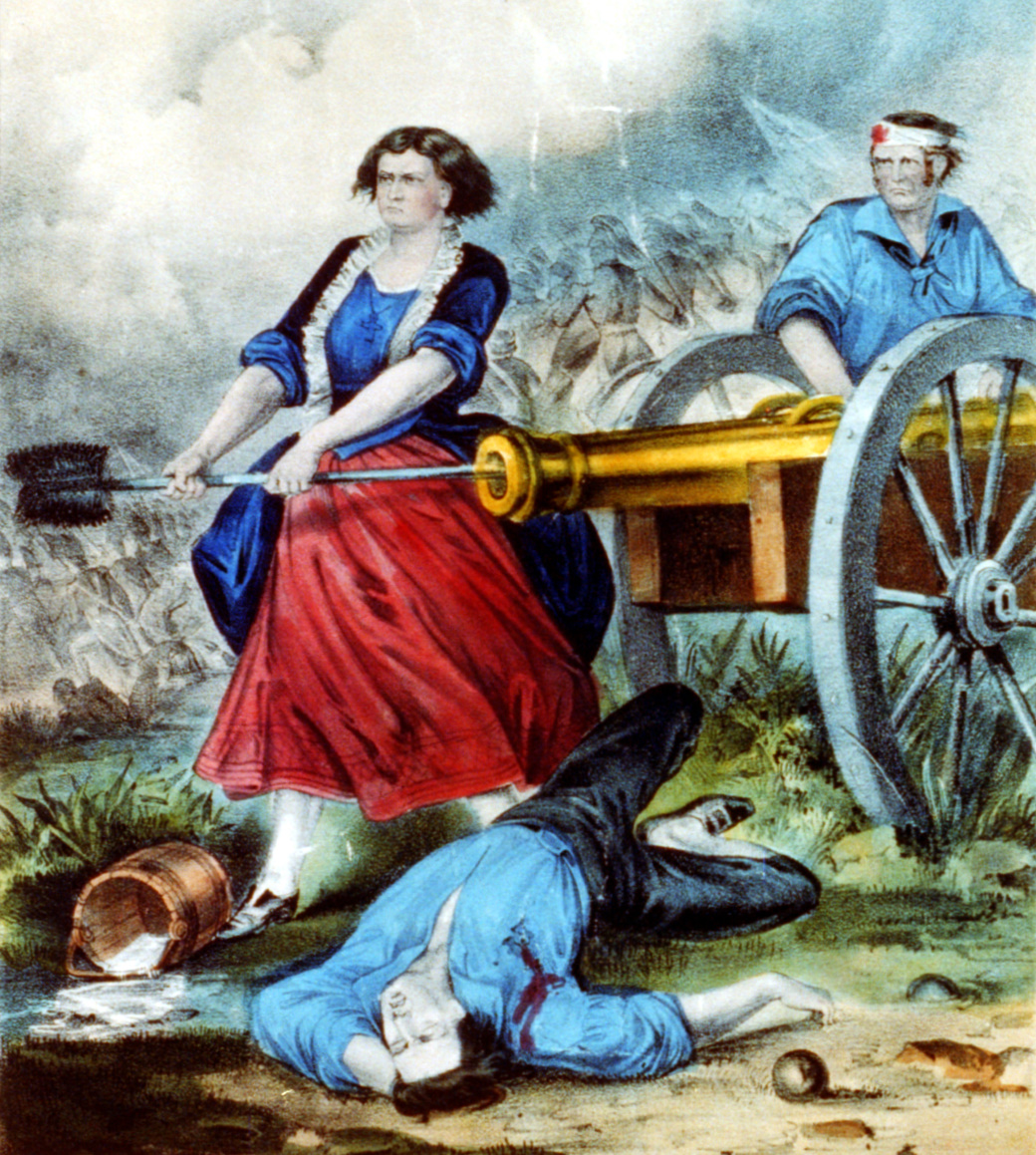
- Mary Hays at the Battle of Monmouth, lithograph
- Born: Mary Ludwig; October 13, 1754; Trenton, New Jersey, British America
- Died: January 22, 1832 (aged 77); Carlisle, Pennsylvania, U.S.
- Spouses: William Hays; John McCauley
- Military career
- Allegiance: United States
- Conflicts: American Revolutionary War: Battle of Monmouth

Mary Ludwig Hays (October 13, 1754 – January 22, 1832) was a woman who fought in the American War of Independence at the Battle of Monmouth. The woman behind the Molly Pitcher story is most often identified as Hays, but it is likely that the legend is an amalgam of more than one woman seen on the battlefield that day.

== Life and military career ==
Mary Ludwig was born in Trenton, New Jersey, British America. There is some dispute over her birth date, but a marker in the cemetery where she is buried lists her birth date as October 13, 1754. She had a moderately sized family which included her older brother Johann Martin; their parents were Maria Margaretha and Johann George Ludwig, who was a butcher. It is likely that she never attended school or learned to read, as education was uncommon among girls at this time.

Her father died in January 1769, and her mother married John Hays the following June. In early 1777, Mary married William Hays, a barber in Carlisle, Pennsylvania. Continental Army records show that he was an artilleryman at the Battle of Monmouth in 1778. Dr. William Irvine organized a boycott of British goods as a protest of the Tea Act on July 12, 1774, in a meeting in the Presbyterian Church in Carlisle, and William Hays' name appears on a list of people who were charged with enforcing it.

=== Valley Forge ===
In 1777, William Hays enlisted in Proctor's 4th Pennsylvania Artillery, which became Proctor's 4th Artillery of the Continental Army. During the winter of 1777, Mary Hays joined her husband at the Continental Army's winter camp at Valley Forge, Pennsylvania. She was one of a group of women, led by Martha Washington, who would wash clothes and blankets, and care for sick and dying soldiers.

In early 1778, the Continental Army trained under Baron Friedrich Wilhelm von Steuben. Hays trained as an artilleryman, and Mary and other camp followers served as water carriers, carrying water to troops who were drilling on the field. Also, artillerymen needed a supply of water to soak the sponge used to clean sparks and gunpowder out of the barrel after each shot. It was during this time that Mary probably received her nickname, as troops would shout, "Molly! Pitcher!" whenever they needed her to bring fresh water.

=== Battle of Monmouth ===
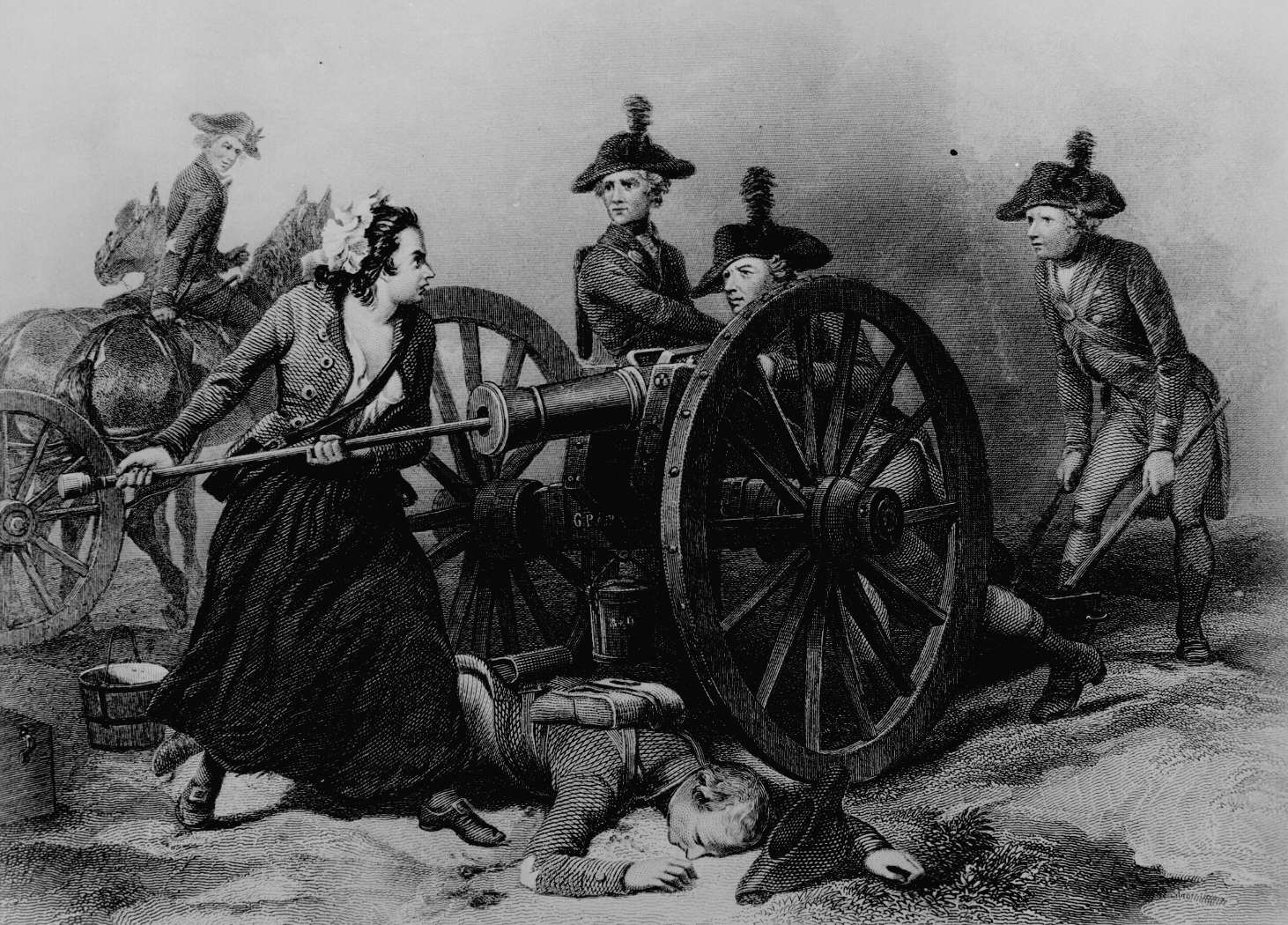
Molly Pitcher at the Battle of Monmouth, engraving by J.C. Armytage, c. 1859

At the Battle of Monmouth in June 1778, Mary Hays attended to American soldiers by giving them water. Just before the battle started, she found a spring to serve as her supply, and two places on the battlefield are now marked as the "Molly Pitcher Spring." She spent much of the early day carrying water to soldiers and artillerymen.

The weather was very hot, and William Hays collapsed during the battle, either wounded or suffering from heat exhaustion. It has often been reported that he was killed in the battle, but it is known that he survived. As he was carried off the battlefield, Mary took his place at the cannon and continued to "swab and load" the cannon using her husband's ramrod. At one point, a British musket ball or cannonball flew between her legs and tore off the bottom of her skirt. She supposedly said something to the effect of, "Well, that could have been worse," and went back to loading the cannon.

Joseph Plumb Martin recalls an incident in his memoirs, writing that at the Battle of Monmouth, "A woman whose husband belonged to the artillery and who was then attached to a piece in the engagement, attended with her husband at the piece the whole time. While in the act of reaching a cartridge and having one of her feet as far before the other as she could step, a cannon shot from the enemy passed directly between her legs without doing any other damage than carrying away all the lower part of her petticoat. Looking at it with apparent unconcern, she observed that it was lucky it did not pass a little higher, for in that case it might have carried away something else, and continued her occupation." However, there is no mention of the woman Martin describes serving the gun crews with water, nor of her husband becoming a casualty.

Later in the evening, the fighting was stopped due to gathering darkness. Although George Washington and his commanders expected the battle to continue the following day, Sir Henry Clinton's army retreated during the night and continued on to Sandy Hook, New Jersey.

After the battle, General Washington asked about the woman whom he had seen loading a cannon on the battlefield. In commemoration of her courage, he issued Mary Hays a warrant as a non-commissioned officer. Afterward, she was known as "Sergeant Molly," a nickname that she used for the rest of her life.

=== Later life and death ===
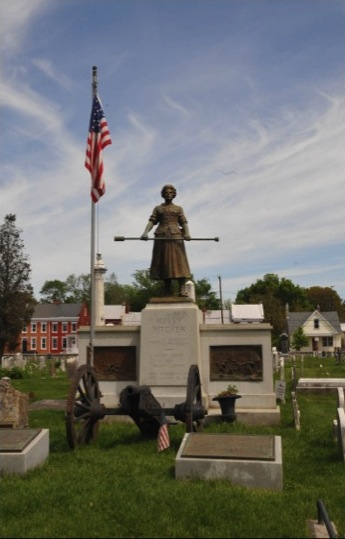
Grave in Carlisle

Following the end of the war, Mary Hays and her husband William returned to Carlisle, Pennsylvania. During this time, Mary gave birth to a son named Johannes (or John). In late 1786, William Hays died.

In 1793, Mary Hays married John McCauley, another Revolutionary War veteran and possibly a friend of William Hays. McCauley was a stone cutter for the local Carlisle prison. However, the marriage was reportedly not a happy one, as McCauley had a violent temper. It was McCauley who was the cause of Mary's financial downfall, causing Mary to sell 200 acres (81 ha) of bounty land left to her by William Hays, for 30 dollars. Sometime between 1807 and 1810, McCauley disappeared, and it is not known what happened to him.

Mary McCauley continued to live in Carlisle. She earned her living as a general servant for hire, cleaning and painting houses, washing windows and caring for children and sick people. "Sergeant Molly," as she was known, was often seen in the streets of Carlisle wearing a striped skirt, wool stockings, and a ruffled cap. She was well-liked by the people of Carlisle, even though she "often cursed like a soldier."

On February 21, 1822, the Commonwealth of Pennsylvania awarded Mary McCauley an annual pension of $40 (equivalent to $968 in 2025) for her service. Mary died January 22, 1832, in Carlisle, at the approximate age of 87. She is buried in the Old Graveyard in Carlisle under the name "Molly McCauley". A statue of "Molly Pitcher," standing alongside a cannon, is also in the cemetery. But according to this same monument—unveiled July 4, 1876, long after Mary/"Molly"'s death—the year she died is marked "January 1833," not January 1832. And the monument also records she was only "Aged 70 years," which (probably erroneously) would place her birth year at 1763, instead of 1754 as noted here.

== The Molly Pitcher story ==
Molly was a common nickname for women named Mary in the Revolutionary time period. Biographical information about Mary Hays has been gathered by historians, including her cultural heritage, given name, probable year of birth, marriages, progeny, and census and tax records, providing a reasonably reliable account of her life. Historian Emily Teipe notes that the deeds in the story of Molly Pitcher are generally attributed to Mary Ludwig Hays. However, she has also pointed out 'The historical record presents other candidates too numerous to mention' and contends that 'the name Molly Pitcher is a collective generic term', serving as a common label for the 'hundreds, perhaps thousands, of women (who) served not only as ammunition wives, manning and firing the guns, but also in the army and colonial militia'.

== Commemorations ==
Mary Ludwig Hays is commemorated, and named as Molly Pitcher, on the Monmouth Battle Monument in Freehold Borough, New Jersey, and on her grave in Carlisle, Pennsylvania.

A stone monument in honor of Molly Pitcher, the Battle of Monmouth Heroine, is located in Monmouth Battlefield State Park. A historical marker atop Perrine Hill describes her service during the battle.

A rest stop or "service area" on the New Jersey Turnpike, in the town of Cranbury, is named for Molly Pitcher.

A mural depicting Mary in battle was painted in the Freehold post office as a WPA project. It was moved to the Monmouth County Library headquarters when the post office closed.

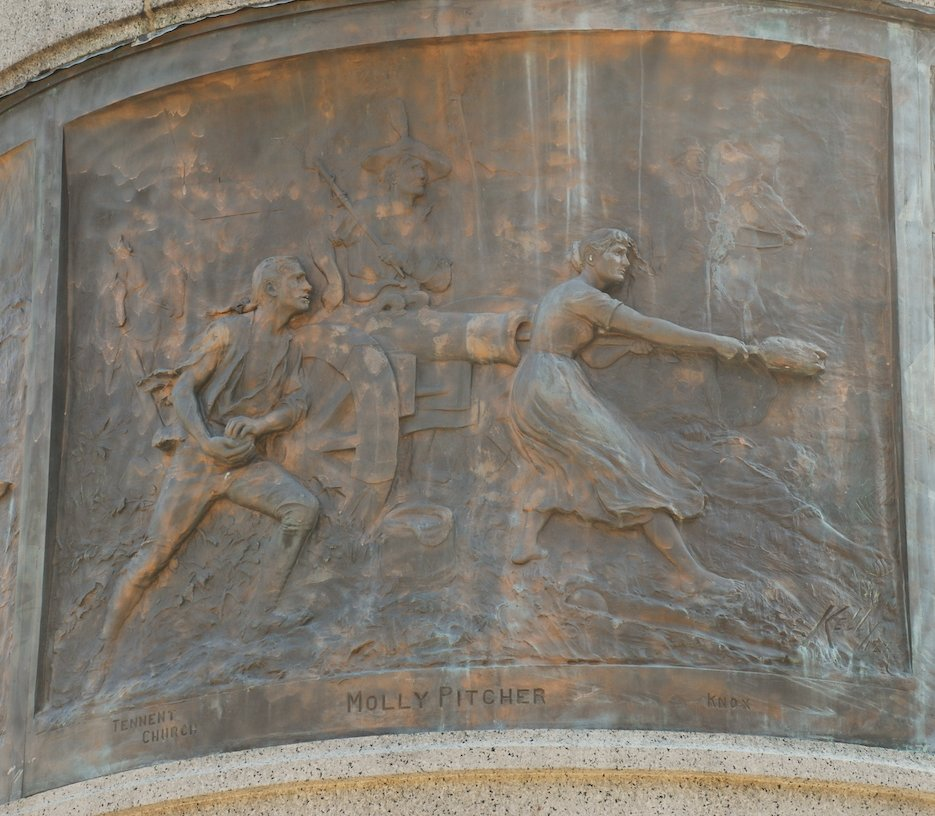
Molly Pitcher (1884) by James E. Kelly, Monmouth Battle Monument

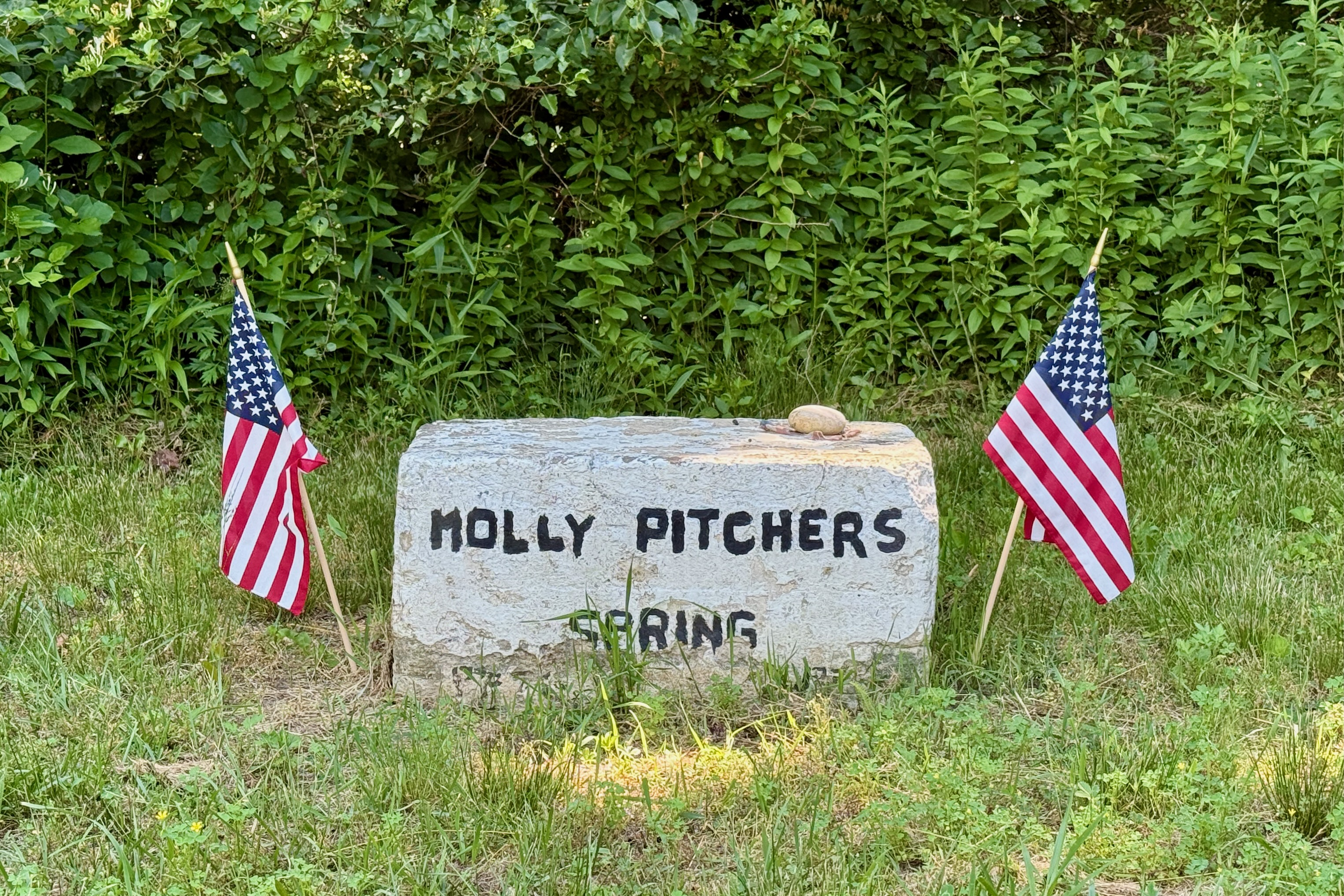
Molly Pitcher's Spring marker at Monmouth Battlefield State Park

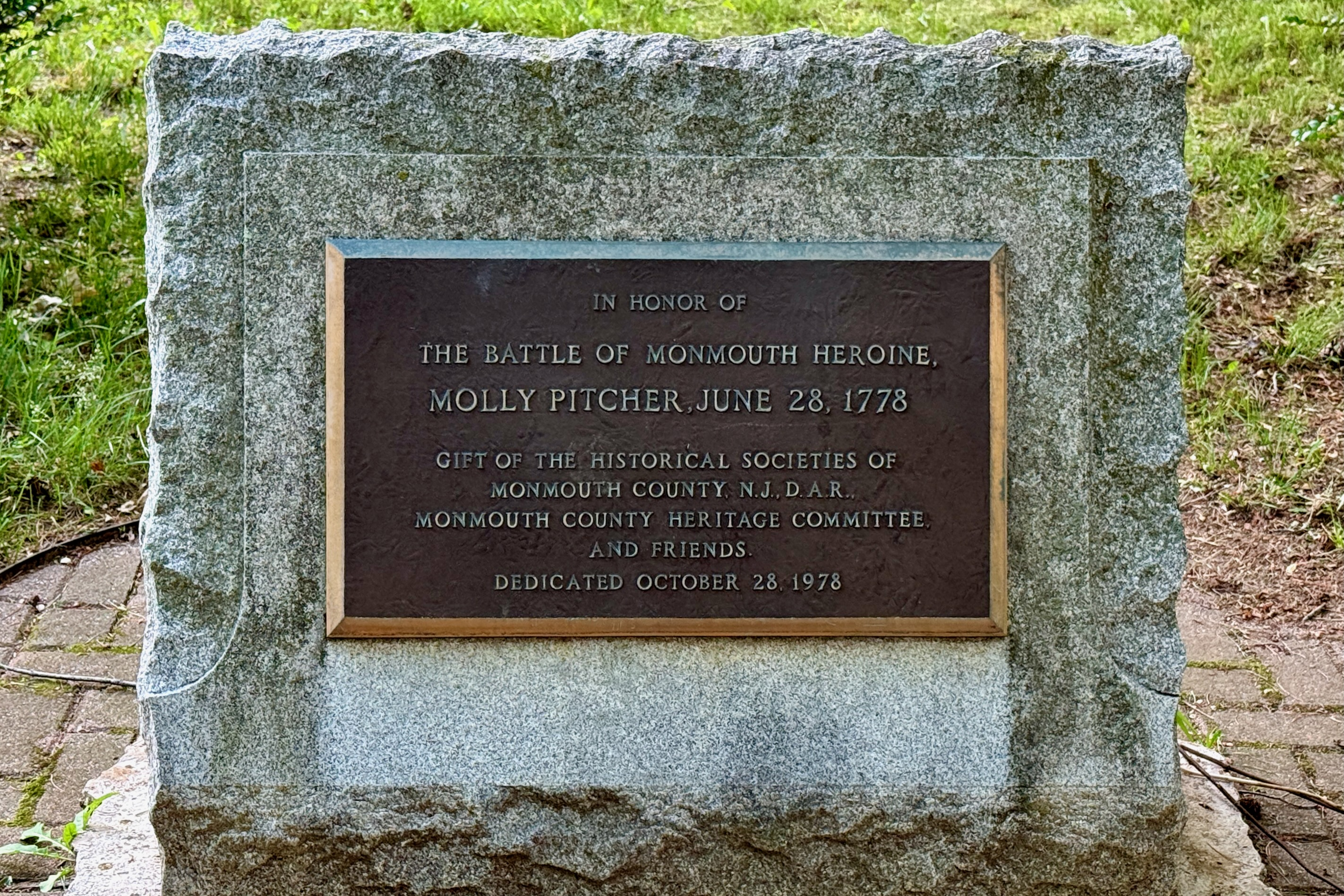
Battlefield monument

Battlefield marker on Perrine Hill

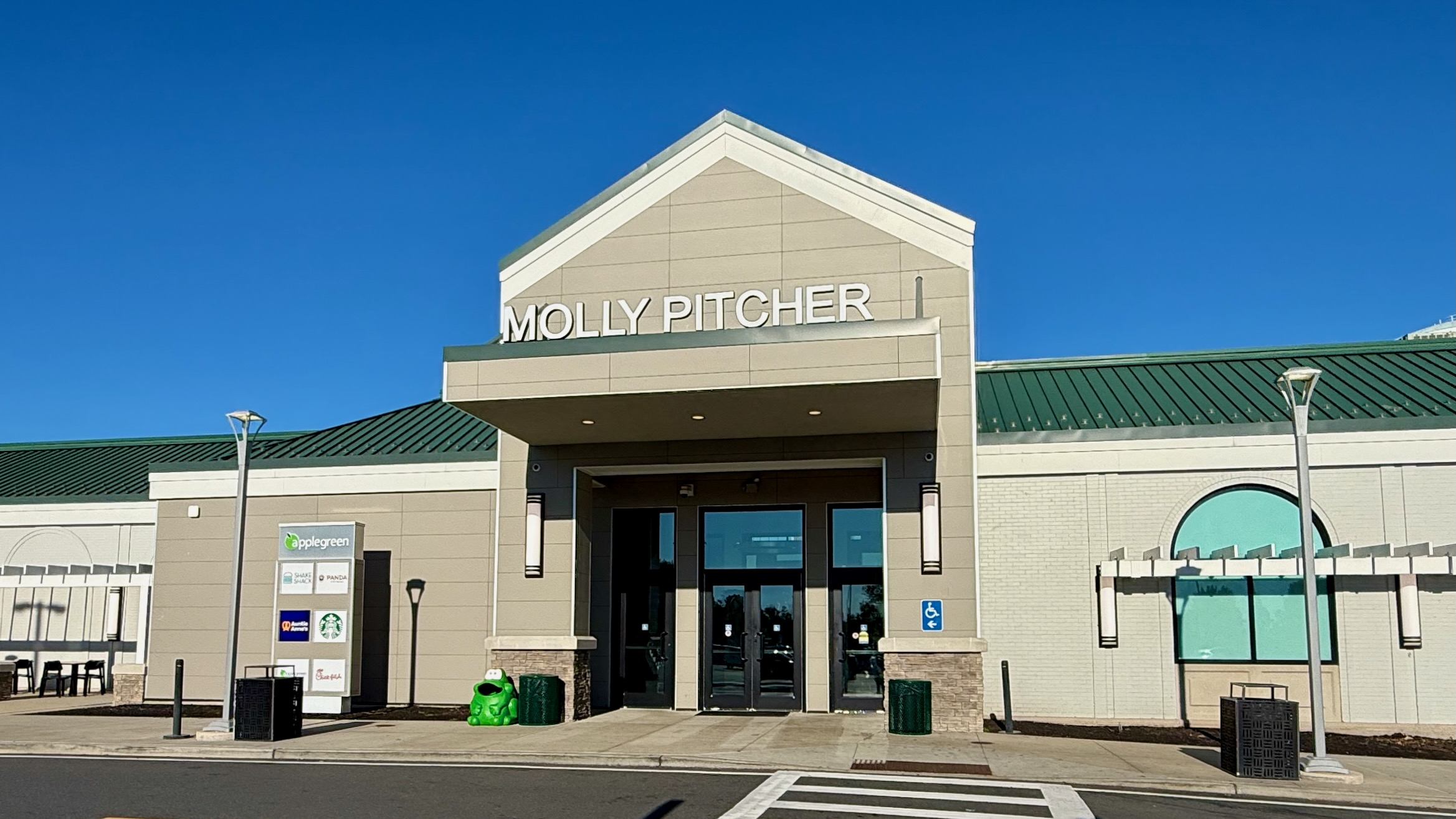
Molly Pitcher Service Area on the New Jersey Turnpike

== See also ==
- Angelina Eberly
- Anna Maria Lane
- Agustina de Aragón
- Deborah Sampson
- Francisca Carrasco Jimenez
- Giuseppa Bolognara Calcagno
- Sally St. Clair

== Bibliography ==
- Bilby, Joseph G., and Katherine Bilby Jenkins. Monmouth Court House: The Battle That Made the American Army. Yardley, PA: Westholme, 2010. ISBN 9781594161087 OCLC 495778701
- Downey, Fairfax. 1956. "The Girls Behind the Guns". American Heritage. 8, no. 1: 46-48.
- Bohrer, Melissa Lukeman. Glory, Passion, and Principle: The Story of Eight Remarkable Women at the Core of the American Revolution. New York: Atria Books, 2003. ISBN 0-7434-5330-1.
- Raphael, Ray. Founding Myths: Stories That Hide Our Patriotic Past. New York: New Press, 2004. ISBN 1-56584-921-3. Raphael regards "Molly Pitcher" as a myth that serves to obscure the actual (though less dramatic) contributions of women to the war effort.
- The Real Pennsylvania Dutch American, "Molly Pitcher" – A Documented History. ISBN 1-4685-1019-3.
