= Anne Bailey =

American storyteller

Anne Trotter Hennis Bailey
- Born: 1742; Liverpool, England
- Died: November 1825 (aged 82–83); Harrison, Ohio
- Military career
- Nicknames: "Mad Anne" Bailey, "White Squaw of the Kanawha", "The Pioneer Heroine of the Great Kanawha Valley"
- Conflicts: American Revolutionary War; Northwest Indian War

Anne Bailey (c. 1742 – November 22, 1825) was a British-born American story teller and frontier scout who served in the fights of the American Revolutionary War and the Northwest Indian War. Her single-person ride in search of an urgently needed powder supply for the endangered Clendenin's Settlement (present-day Charleston, West Virginia) was used as the template for Charles Robb's 1861 poem "Anne Bailey's Ride". She is known as the Heroine of the Kanawha Valley.

== Early life ==
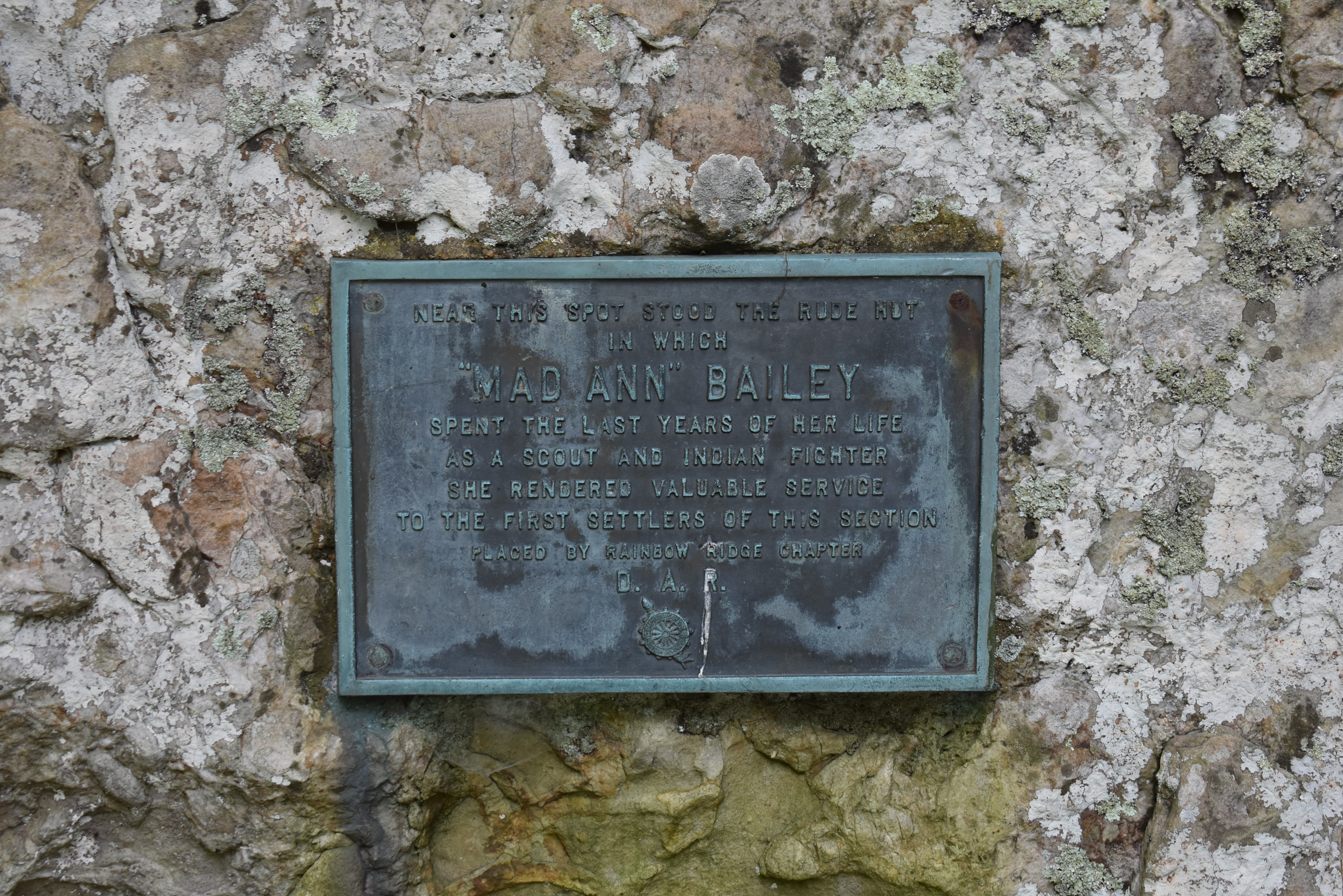
Plaque where Bailey used to live near Falling Spring, Virginia

"Mad Anne" Bailey was born in Liverpool, England. She first arrived in Shenandoah Valley, Virginia, at about the age of 19 after both of her parents died in 1760. In 1765, she married Virginian militiaman Richard Trotter. He served in Lord Dunmore's War and was killed on October 10, 1774, in an encounter with the Shawnee tribe forces led by Cornstalk at the Battle of Point Pleasant.

== Military service ==
Trotter's death was a turning point in Anne's life. She left her son William with a close neighbor, then joined the militia. Bailey worked as a scout and courier during the Revolutionary War. Bailey was involved in the campaigns against Shawnee Native Americans, who gave her the nickname "Mad Anne.". She was also known as the "White Squaw of Kanawha.

In 1788, Anne married John Bailey, a frontiersman and ranger. The couple was posted to Fort Lee. Bailey continued her service for the U.S. military by patrolling the frontier against Native Americans and acting as a messenger between Fort Lee and frontier posts. It was here in 1790 or 1791 that the local fort, Fort Lee, was under heavy threat, when Anne made her legendary 100 mile ride to Fort Savannah at Lewisburg for much needed ammunition. Her path was through wilderness, and she rode both directions successfully and is credited with saving Fort Lee. The story, however, may be apocryphal. Bailey remained on duty until 1795 when the Treaty of Greenville ended the Northwest Indian War.

In 1794, John Bailey was murdered near Point Pleasant, Virginia (now West Virginia), and his will was filed in the county court that same year. After that, she lived with her son but still traveled and visited friends. A few years after John Bailey's death, she traveled to Alabama, apparently to visit her stepson, Abram Bailey. When her son and his family left Virginia for Gallia County, Ohio, she left with them. Until her death, she continued to travel. Her remains were later moved to Tu-Endie-Wei State Park. The museum there shows several of her memorabilia with special mention of a design made from her hair.

== Later life ==
Bailey was widowed again, encouraging her to move further into the frontier to Gallia, Ohio, in 1818. On the frontier, Bailey continued to act as an express rider despite being over seventy years old. She died in Ohio in 1825 at eighty-three years old. Her remains were reinterred in Trotter graveyard near her son's house and was there for 76 years but in October 1901 her body was moved to Point Pleasant, West Virginia, State Park.

== Legacy ==
Several institutions have been named for Anne Bailey, including Anne Bailey Elementary in St. Albans, West Virginia, the Daughters of the American Revolution chapter in Charleston, West Virginia, and a lookout tower in Watoga State Park.

== Literature ==
- Crook, Valerie F. Historic Ride of "Mad" Anne Bailey, extracted from The History of West Virginia, Old and New, Vol. I, pg. 99-100, by James Morton Callahan, 1923.
- Hill, Frank. The True Life of Anne Bailey. 1979. Reprinted by The Gallia County Historical Society, Gallipolis, OH.
- Hollis, Suzanne. "Anne Bailey" in Women Soldiers in the American Revolutionary War (http://userpages.aug.com/captbarb/femvets.html). 1996. ed. by Captain Barbara A. Wilson, USAF (Ret.).
- Howe, Henry. Historical Collections of Ohio. Norwalk, O.: State of Ohio, Laning Printing Co., 1888.
- Laidley, W. S. History of Charleston and Kanawha County, West Virginia. Chicago, IL: Richmond-Arnold Pub. Co., 1911. pg. 81–85.
- Lautenschlager, Hedda. In American National Biography, Vol. 1, pg. 874–5. New York: Oxford University Press, 1999.
- Lewis, Virgil A., Life and Times of Anne Bailey, the Pioneer Heroine of the Great Kanawha Valley. Charleston, WV: The Butler Printing Company, 1891.
