= Sally St. Clair =

American woman who posed as a man and served in the Continental Army

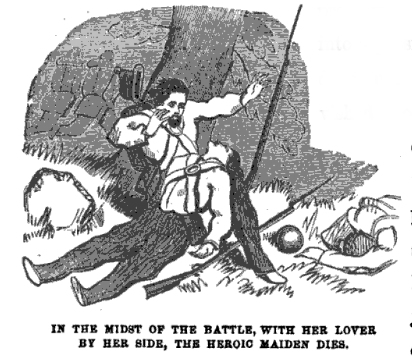
Illustration from Thrilling Adventures Among the Early Settlers by W. Wildwood, 1866.

Sally St. Clair or St. Clare (died 1779) was an American woman from South Carolina who disguised herself as a man and joined the Continental Army. Her true gender was not discovered by her fellow soldiers until after she was killed in battle during the Siege of Savannah.

Little is known about St. Clair. She is variously described as a Creole woman, a woman of color, and a woman of African and French descent. By some accounts she joined the army to be with her lover, sergeant William Jaspar from Francis Marion's Brigade, and was killed saving his life. She may have served as a gunner. Several sources claim she was killed during the Battle of Savannah in 1778.

"Romantic Victorians" such as George Pope Morris claimed that even her lover did not recognize her until after she was killed and her body was prepared for burial. Morris's poem about St. Clair begins:

In the ranks of Marion's band,
Through morass and wooded land,
Over beach of yellow sand,
Mountain, plain and valley;
A southern maid, in all her pride,
March'd gayly at her lover's side,
In such disguise
That e'en his eyes
Did not discover Sally.

Morris describes St. Clair as a "beautiful, dark-eyed Creole girl" with "long, jetty ringlets," and claims that she died of a lance thrust aimed at her lover, Sergeant Jasper. He goes on to say that "there was not a dry eye in the corps when Sally St. Clair was laid in her grave, near the River Santee, in a green shady nook that looked as if it had been stolen out of Paradise."

Warren Wildwood tells her story in similarly picturesque terms in Thrilling Adventures Among the Early Settlers (1866). Echoing Morris, Wildwood describes the "tearful group" of "hardy warriors" who buried St. Clair.

Acclaimed folklorist and professor Richard Dorson of Indiana University accredits St. Clair alongside the likes of Deborah Sampson, Nancy Hart, and Sacagawea. Dorson indicates unconventional heroines as recent subjects of scholarly interest for researchers and editors to "do right by women" and uncover the untold stories of female pioneers.

A commentary in a 1906 South Carolina historical society article detailing a 1784 land grant given to Sgt. Jasper's heir William Jasper, says the reading of the land grant information "is recommended to the consideration of those people who believe that silly story about a girl named Sinclair who in man's attire followed Jasper into service because of her love for him and was killed in an action on the Santee."

Military historian Janice E. McKenney cites American historian Linda Grant DePauw, offering skepticism regarding the inflation of Revolutionary heroines' true impacts on military efforts. DePauw argues it to be "foolish" to "pretend" women like St. Clair held "any military significance" during the American Revolutionary War.

== See also ==
- Margaret Corbin
- Anna Maria Lane
- Mary Hays (American Revolutionary War)
- Deborah Sampson
