= Deborah Sampson =

Continental Army soldier (1760–1827)

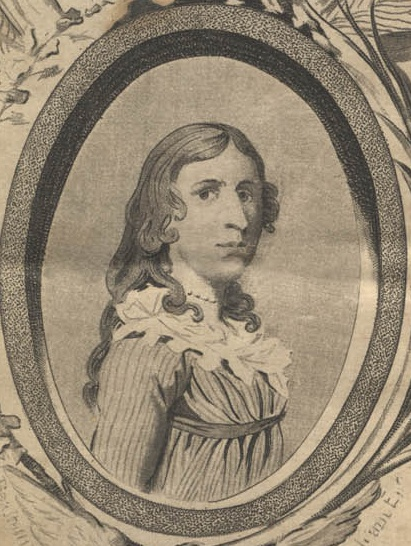
- Frontispiece of The Female Review: Life of Deborah Sampson, the Female Soldier in the War of Revolution
- Born: December 17, 1760; Plympton, Massachusetts
- Died: April 29, 1827 (aged 66); Sharon, Massachusetts
- Burial place: Rock Ridge Cemetery, Sharon, Massachusetts
- Spouse: Benjamin Gannett (m. 1785)
- Children: 4
- Military career
- Allegiance: United States
- Branch: Continental Army
- Service years: 1782–1783
- Rank: Private
- Units: Light Infantry Company, 4th Massachusetts Regiment
- Conflicts: American Revolutionary War
- Other work: Teacher; Weaver; Soldier; Lecturer; Farmer

Deborah Sampson Gannett, also known as Deborah Samson or Deborah Sampson, (December 17, 1760 – April 29, 1827) was a Massachusetts woman who disguised herself as a man in order to serve in the Continental Army during the American Revolutionary War. Born in Plympton, Massachusetts, she served under the name Robert Shirtliff – sometimes spelled Shurtleff or Shirtleff. She was in uniform for 17 months before her sex was discovered in 1783 when she required medical treatment after contracting a fever in Philadelphia.

After her real identity was made known to her commander, she was honorably discharged at West Point, New York. After her discharge, Sampson met and married Benjamin Gannett in 1785. In 1802, she became one of the first women to go on a lecture tour to speak about her wartime experiences. She died of yellow fever in Sharon, Massachusetts, in 1827. She was proclaimed the Official Heroine of the Commonwealth of Massachusetts on May 23, 1983, and in 1985 the United States Capitol Historical Society posthumously honored "Deborah Samson" with the Commemorative Medal.

== Early life ==
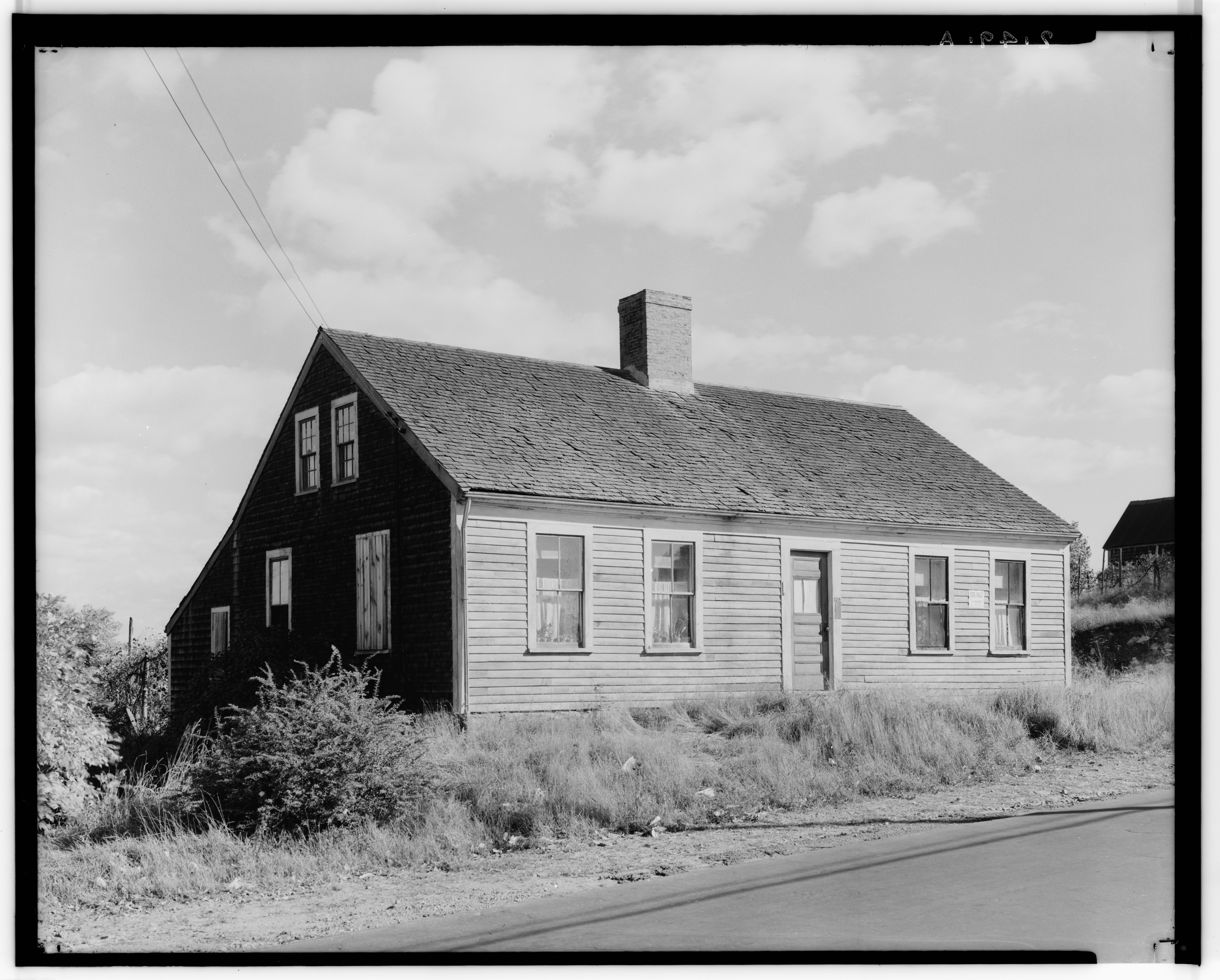
Deborah Sampson ancestral home

Deborah Sampson was born on December 17, 1760, in Plympton, Massachusetts, to Jonathan Sampson (or Samson) and Deborah Bradford. Sampson was born in the ancestral home of her grandparents, a house that still stands. Her siblings were Jonathan (b. 1753), Elisha (b. 1755), Hannah (b. 1756), Ephraim (b. 1759), Nehemiah (b. 1764), and Sylvia (b. 1766). Sampson's mother was the great-granddaughter of William Bradford, the second Governor of Plymouth Colony. Sampson's father was a descendant of Henry Samson.

Sampson's family was told that her father died in a shipwreck, but evidence indicates that he actually abandoned the family and migrated to Lincoln County, Maine. He had a common-law wife named Martha, with whom he had at least two children, and returned to Plympton in 1794 to attend to a property transaction. In 1770, a man named Jonathan Sampson was indicted for murder in Maine, but it is uncertain whether this individual was Sampson's father because the case never went to trial, so no details about the defendant are known. Jonathan Sampson died in Maine some time after 1807.

After Sampson's father abandoned the family her mother was unable to provide for her children, so she placed them in the households of friends and relatives, a common practice in 18th-century New England; Sampson was placed in the home of a maternal relative. When her mother died shortly afterwards, she was sent to live with Reverend Peter Thatcher's widow Mary Prince Thatcher (1688–1771), who was then in her eighties. Historians believe Sampson learned to read while living with Widow Thatcher, who might have wanted Sampson to read Bible verses to her.

Upon Thatcher's death, Sampson was sent to live with the Jeremiah Thomas family in Middleborough, where she worked as an indentured servant from 1770 to 1778. Although treated well, she was not sent to school like the Thomas children because Thomas was not a believer in the education of women. Sampson was able to overcome Thomas's opposition by learning from Thomas's sons, who shared their school work with her. This method was apparently successful; when her time as an indentured servant was over at age 18, Sampson made a living by teaching school during the summer sessions in 1779 and 1780. She worked as a weaver in the winter; Sampson was highly skilled and worked for the Sproat Tavern as well as the Bourne, Morton, and Leonard families. During her time teaching and weaving, she boarded with the families that employed her.

Sampson was also reported to have woodworking and mechanical aptitude. Her skills included basket weaving, and light carpentry such as producing milking stools and winter sleds. She was also experienced with fashioning wooden tools and implements including weather vanes, spools for thread, and quills for weaving. She also produced pie crimpers, which she sold door to door.

== Physical description ==
Sampson was approximately five feet seven inches (1.70 m) to five feet eight inches (1.73 m) tall, above average when compared to the average male of her day, who was around 5 feet 5 inches (1.65 m), and the average woman, who was about 5 feet (1.5 m). Her biographer, Hermann Mann, who knew her personally for many years, implied that she was not thin, writing in 1797 that "her waist might displease a coquette." He also reported that her breasts were very small, and that she bound them with a linen cloth to hide them during her years in uniform. Mann wrote that "the features of her face are regular; but not what a physiognomist would term the most beautiful."

A neighbor who as a boy knew Sampson in her later years remarked that she was "a person of plain features." A descendant named Pauline Hildreth Monk Wise (1914–1994) was believed by relatives to have strongly resembled Sampson, based on comparison of Pauline's physical appearance to a 1797 portrait of Sampson, contemporary descriptions of Sampson's features and height, and Pauline's height, which at 6 feet (1.8 m) was taller than most men. Sampson's appearance – tall, broad, strong, and not delicately feminine – contributed to her success at pretending to be a man.

== Army service ==
In early 1782, Sampson joined an Army unit in Middleborough, Massachusetts, under the name Timothy Thayer. She collected a bonus and then failed to meet up with her company as scheduled. Inquiries by the company commander revealed that Sampson had been recognized by a local resident at the time she signed her enlistment papers. Her deception uncovered, she repaid the portion of the bonus that she had not spent, but she was not subjected to further punishment by the Army. The Baptist church to which she belonged learned of her actions and withdrew its fellowship, meaning that its members refused to associate with her unless she apologized and asked forgiveness.

In May 1782, Sampson enlisted again, this time in Uxbridge, Massachusetts, under the name "Robert Shirtliff" (also spelled in some sources as "Shirtliffe" or "Shurtleff"). She joined the Light Infantry Company of the 4th Massachusetts Regiment, under the command of Captain George Webb. This unit, consisting of 50 to 60 men, was first quartered in Bellingham, Massachusetts, and later mustered at Worcester with the rest of the regiment commanded by Colonel William Shepard. Light Infantry Companies were elite troops, specially picked because they were taller and stronger than average. Their job was to provide rapid flank coverage for advancing regiments, as well as rearguard and forward reconnaissance duties for units on the move. Because she joined an elite unit, Sampson's disguise was more likely to succeed, since no one was likely to look for a woman among soldiers who were specially chosen for their above average size and superior physical ability.

In June or July 1782, Sampson participated in combat near Tarrytown, New York with about 30 infantrymen from her unit, who skirmished with a local band of Tories. Sampson was shot in her thigh and sustained a sword cut to her forehead. She begged her fellow soldiers not to take her to a doctor out of fear her sex would be discovered, but a soldier put her on his horse and took her to a hospital. A doctor treated her head wound, but she left the hospital before he could attend to her leg. She removed the ball herself with a penknife and sewing needle, but some of the shot was too deep to reach. As described in her later applications for a pension, her leg never fully healed. On April 1, 1783, she was reassigned to new duties, and spent seven months serving as a waiter to General John Paterson.

On June 24, the President of Congress ordered George Washington to send a contingent of soldiers under Paterson to Philadelphia to help quell a rebellion of American soldiers who were protesting delays in receiving their pay and discharges. During the summer of 1783, Sampson became ill in Philadelphia and was cared for by Doctor Barnabas Binney (1751–1787). After Sampson fell unconscious due to fever, Dr. Binney removed her clothes to treat her and discovered the cloth she used to bind her breasts. Without revealing his discovery to army authorities, he took her to his house, where his wife, daughters, and a nurse cared for her.

In September 1783, following the signing of the Treaty of Paris, November 3 was set as the date for soldiers to muster out. When Dr. Binney asked Sampson to deliver a note to General Paterson, she correctly assumed that it would reveal her sex. In other cases, women who pretended to be men to serve in the army were reprimanded, but Paterson gave her a discharge, a note with some words of advice, and enough money to travel home. She was honorably discharged at West Point, New York, by General Henry Knox on October 25, 1783, after a year and a half of service.

An official record of Deborah Sampson Gannet's service as "Robert Shirtliff" from May 20, 1782, to October 25, 1783, appears in the "Massachusetts Soldiers and Sailors of the Revolutionary War" Volume 14 p. 164.

== Marriage ==
Sampson married Benjamin Gannett (1757–1837), a Sharon, Massachusetts, farmer, in Stoughton, Massachusetts, on April 7, 1785. After her discharge and marriage to Gannett, Sampson lived as a typical farmer’s wife. They were the parents of four children: Earl (b. 1786), Mary ("Polly") (b. 1788), Patience (b. 1790), and Susanna Baker Shepherd, whom they adopted after she was orphaned. They lived with Gannett's father on the Gannett family farm, but had limited success because it was smaller than average and the land had been overworked.

== Life after the military ==
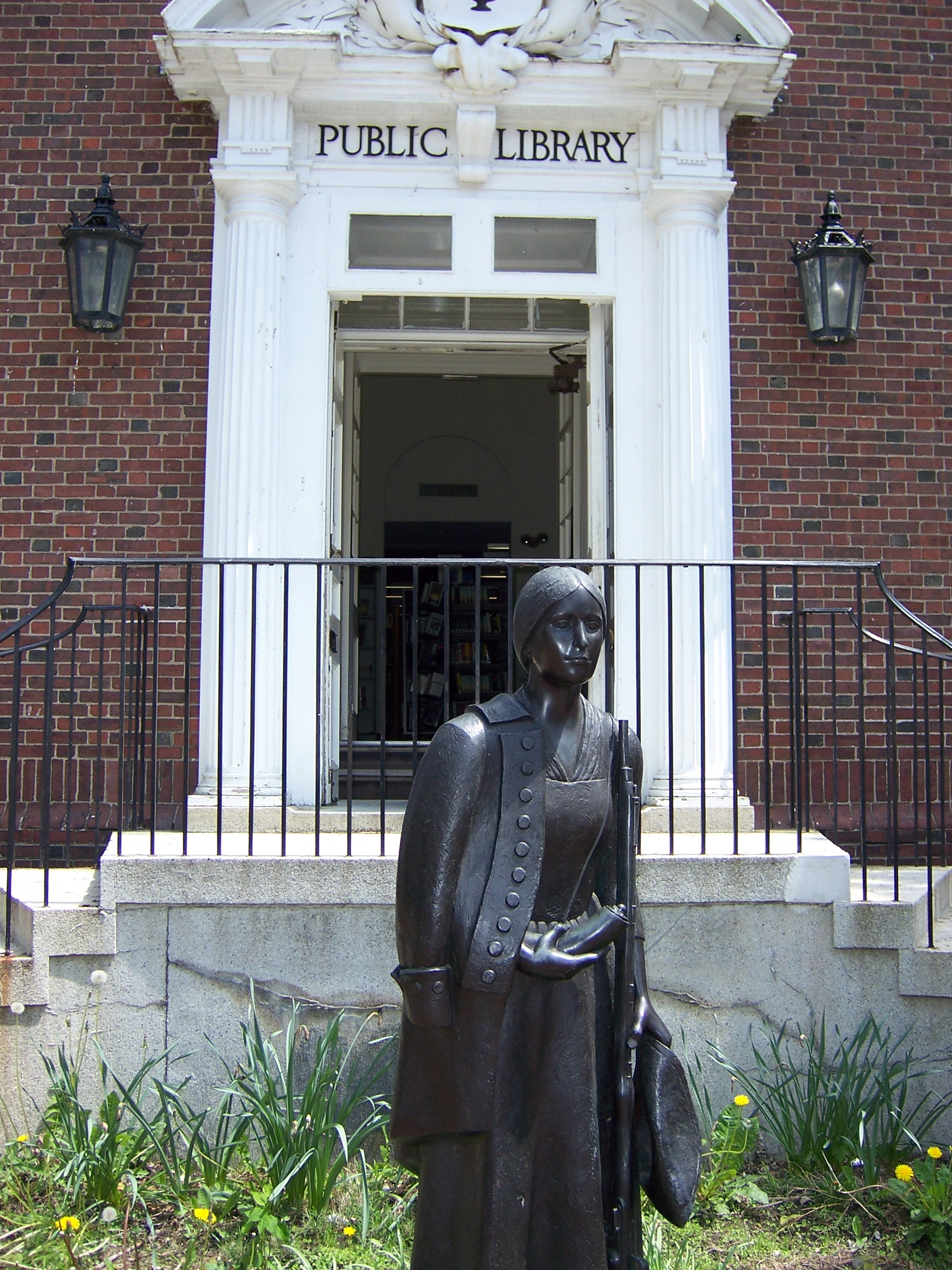
Statue of Sampson at the Sharon, Massachusetts public library

In January 1792, Sampson petitioned the Massachusetts State Legislature for pay that the army had withheld because she was a woman. The petition states, "Deborah Gannett, of Sharon, in the county of Norfolk, and District of Massachusetts, a resident and nation of the United States, and applicant for a pension from the United States, under an Act of Congress entitled an Act to provide for certain persons engaged in the land and naval service of the United States, in the revolutionary war, maketh oath, that she served as a private soldier, under the name of Robert Shurtleff, in the war of the revolution..." The legislature granted her petition and Governor John Hancock signed it. The legislature awarded her 34 pounds plus interest back to her 1783 discharge. A biography by Herman Mann was published in 1797, The Female Review: Life of Deborah Sampson, the Female Soldier in the War of Revolution.

In 1802, Sampson began giving lectures about her wartime service. After extolling the virtues of traditional gender roles for women, she left the stage, returned in her army uniform, then proceeded to perform a complicated and physically taxing military drill and ceremony routine. She performed both to earn money and to justify her enlistment, but even with these speaking engagements, her husband and she were unable to pay all the family's expenses. She frequently had to borrow money from her family and from her friend Paul Revere. Revere also wrote letters to government officials on her behalf, requesting that she be awarded a pension for her military service and her wounds.

In 1804, Revere wrote to U.S. Representative William Eustis of Massachusetts on Sampson's behalf. A military pension had never been requested for a woman, but Revere wrote: "I have been induced to enquire her situation, and character, since she quit the male habit, and soldiers uniform; for the more decent apparel of her own gender... humanity and justice obliges me to say, that every person with whom I have conversed about her, and it is not a few, speak of her as a woman with handsome talents, good morals, a dutiful wife, and an affectionate parent." On March 11, 1805, Congress approved the request and placed Sampson on the Massachusetts Invalid Pension Roll at the rate of four dollars a month.

On February 22, 1806, Sampson wrote once more to Revere requesting a loan of ten dollars: "My own indisposition and that of my sons causes me again to solicit your goodness in our favor though I, with Gratitude, confess it rouses every tender feeling and I blush at the thought of receiving ninety and nine good turns as it were – my circumstances require that I should ask the hundredth." He sent the ten dollars. In 1809, she sent another petition to Congress, asking that her pension as an invalid soldier be modified to start from her discharge in 1783. Had her petition been approved, she would have been awarded back pay of $960 ($48 a year for 20 years — approximately $13,800 in 2016). Her petition was initially denied, but when it came before Congress again in 1816 an award of $76.80 a year (about $1,100 in 2016) was approved. With this amount, she was able to repay all her loans and make improvements to the family farm.

== Death ==
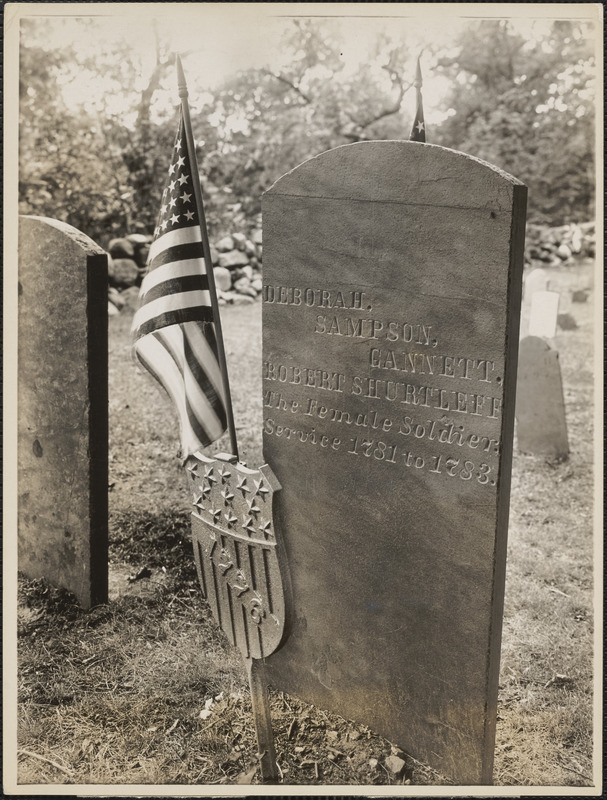
Deborah Sampson's grave, Sharon, Massachusetts

Sampson died of yellow fever on April 29, 1827. She was buried at Rock Ridge Cemetery in Sharon, Massachusetts.

== Spousal support ==
Four years after Sampson's death, her husband Benjamin Gannett petitioned Congress for a pension as the spouse of a veteran. In 1837, the committee overseeing his petition decreed that the history of the Revolution "furnished no other example of female heroism, fidelity and courage." Gannett was awarded a pension, but died before he could receive it.

== Gender and sexual orientation ==
After leaving military service, Sampson is not recorded to have gone about her daily life in male dress, but she did continue to wear a soldier's uniform and perform a masculine gender on speaking tours. Contemporary writers about Sampson's performances compared her to the Chevalière d'Éon, a well-known genderfluid figure from the time.

Sampson is recorded having romantic interactions with both women and men. While living as Robert Shirtliff, she engaged in an extended flirtation with a "Baltimore lady," who bought her a number of expensive and romantically charged gifts. Historian Greta LaFleur has argued that Sampson's first biographer, Herman Mann, understood the relationship between Sampson and the Baltimore lady to be a romantic and sexual one. After the Revolutionary War, while presenting as a woman, Sampson married Benjamin Gannett and raised a family with him for many years.

Historians have offered different interpretations of Sampson's reasons for adopting male dress and joining the military. While most scholars understand Deborah Sampson as a cisgender woman looking for economic and political opportunity through cross-dressing, some scholars have argued that Deborah Sampson could also be understood as a lesbian, drag performer, or transmasculine person who was able to pursue romantic relationships with women or a more comfortable gender presentation through crossdressing.

== Legacy ==
=== Deborah Sampson Act ===
In December 2020, The Deborah Sampson Act was signed into law, which would "eliminate barriers to care and services" faced by women veterans. Among its many provisions, the law created an Office of Women's Health in the Office of Veterans' Affairs (VA).

=== Memorials ===
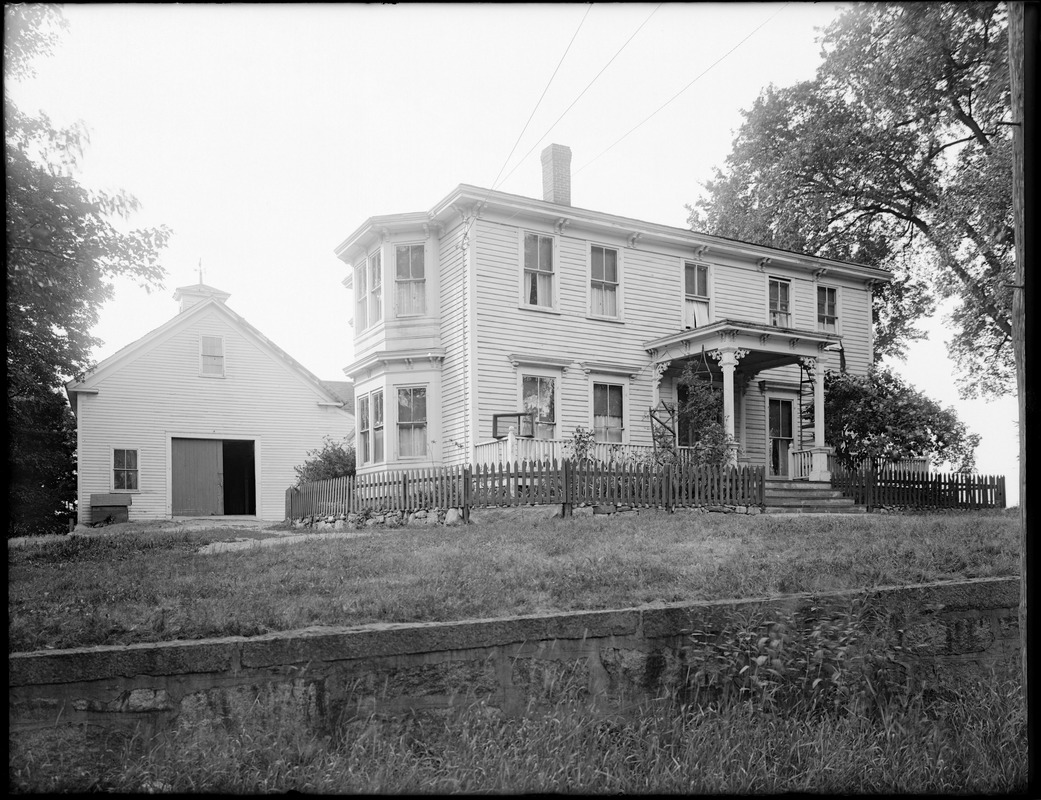
Deborah Sampson Gannett House, East Street, Sharon, Mass., August 7, 1930. Leon Abdalian Collection, Boston Public Library

The town of Sharon memorializes her with a statue in front of the public library, the Deborah Sampson Park, and the "Deborah Sampson Gannett House", which is privately owned and not open to the public. The farmland around the home is protected to ensure no development occurs on the historic homestead.

In 1906, the town of Plympton, Massachusetts, with the Deborah Sampson Chapter of the Daughters of the American Revolution, placed a boulder on the town green, with a bronze plaque inscribed to Sampson's memory.

During World War II, the Liberty Ship S.S. Deborah Gannett (2620) was named in her honor. It was laid down March 10, 1944, launched April 10, 1944, and scrapped in 1962.

As of 2000, the town flag of Plympton incorporates Sampson as the Official Heroine of the Commonwealth of Massachusetts.

=== Portrayals in art and media ===
- Portrait of Deborah: A Drama in Three Acts (1959) is a play by Charles Emery that made its debut at the Camden Hills Theatre, Camden, Maine, on February 19, 1959.
- I'm Deborah Sampson: A Soldier of the Revolution (1977) by Patricia Clapp is a fictional account of Sampson's early life and experience in the Revolutionary War.
- Sampson is depicted as Robert Shurtless, one of the comedic soldiers in The Rebel Mess in The American Revolution (1999) by Kirk Wood Bromley.
- Whoopi Goldberg provided the voice of Sampson in "Deborah Sampson: Soldier of the Revolution" (2003), episode 34 of Liberty's Kids.
- Alex Myers, a descendant of Sampson's, published Revolutionary (2014), a fictionalized account of her life.
- Historian and journalist Alison Leigh Cowan presented "Deborah Sampson: Continental Army soldier," a biographical talk at Saint Paul's Church National Historic Site on July 7, 2016.
- Meryl Streep included Sampson in her speech at the 2016 Democratic National Convention, along with other women who had made history.
- Sampson's story, as narrated by Paget Brewster, was re-enacted in the fifth season premiere of Drunk History, with Evan Rachel Wood portraying Sampson.
- Cloaked in Courage: Deborah Sampson, Patriot Soldier is a book by Beth Anderson and published by Calkins Creek, 2022. ISBN 9781635926101
- A Girl Called Samson: A Novel is a historical-fiction novel by Amy Harmon and published by Lake Union, 2023. ISBN 1542039746
- The Memoir of a Female Soldier: Deborah Sampson's American Revolution is a historical novel by Jan Lewis Nelson published by Massaemett Media, 2023. ISBN 9798218140120

== See also ==
- Cathay Williams
- Anna Maria Lane
- Mary Ludwig Hays
- Molly Corbin
- Eleonore Prochaska
- Agustina de Aragón
- Sally St. Clair
- Lola Sánchez
- Loreta Janeta Velázquez
