= Chihuahua (chief) =

Chief of the Chokonen local group of the Tsokanende Band of Chiricahua Apache

- Kla-esch
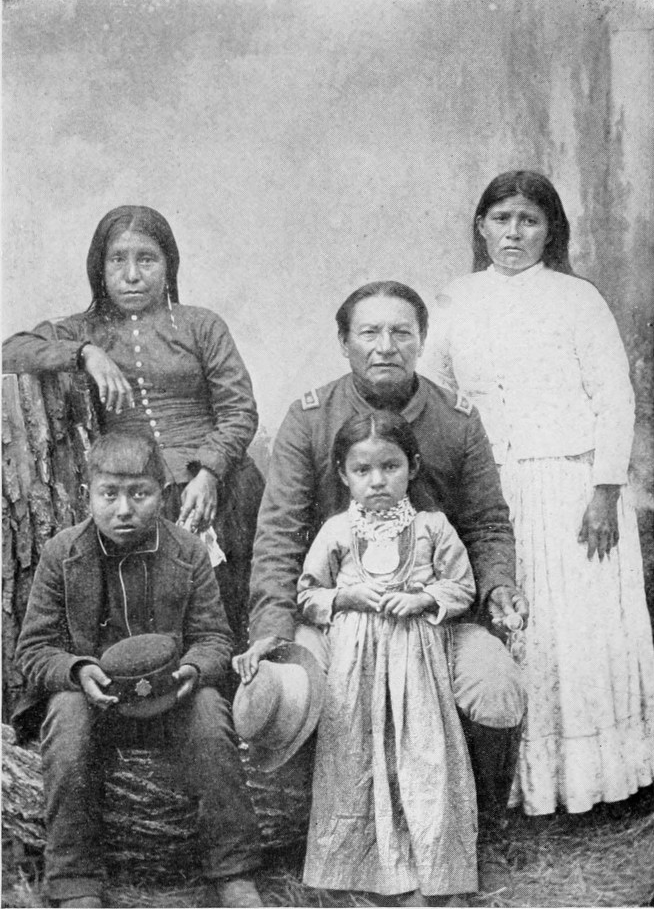
- Chihuahua and his family

Chiricahua leader

Personal details
- Born: c. 1822
- Died: July 25, 1901
- Nickname(s): Chowana, Chowwanwan

Chihuahua or Chewawa, (c. 1822/1825 – 25 July 1901), was chief of the Chokonen local group of the Tsokanende Band of Chiricahua Apache who carried out several raids on settlers in Arizona in the 1870s and 1880s. His elder brother Ulzana (c. 1821–1909), who would later become known as leader of a very famous raid through New Mexico and Arizona in 1885, was his war chief (segundo). Chihuahua's name in the Mescalero-Chiricahua language was Kla-esh or Tłá'í'ez ("To push something under something else with your foot").

== Biography ==
Chihuahua was a protege of Cochise, fought under Cochise orders, and he surrendered with Cochise in 1872 going to live on the San Carlos Reservation in southern Arizona, where he became first sergeant of a company of Apache Scouts in 1880 under Lieutenant James A. Maney.

Both brothers—Chihuahua and Ulzana—followed Cochise voluntary but after Cochise's death, they—together with Skinya (c. 1825–1876) and his brother Pionsenay (c. 1830–c. 1878)—didn't recognize Cochise's sons' leadership. Skinya (brother-in-law of Naiche) was killed by Naiche (c. 1857–1919) himself and Pionsenay (youngest brother of Skinya) was badly wounded by Tahzay (c. 1843–1876).

Three years later Chihuahua fled the reservation to lead a war party into Mexico, but surrendered to General George Crook in 1883.

He left the reservation in San Carlos again with Geronimo and other chiefs in 1885 after the tiswin incident and led raids into Mexico, finally surrendering again to Crook in 1886.

On April 7, 1886, Chihuahua was shipped to Fort Marion, Florida, with the remaining Chiricahua renegades. In May 1888, he was transferred to Mount Vernon Barracks in Mobile, Alabama. In October 1893 the remaining were transferred to Fort Sill, Oklahoma. A cemetery and the hill on which he lived at Fort Sill are named after him.
