= Pionsenay =

Chiricahua Apache military leader (c. 1830–c. 1878)

- Born: c. 1830; Apacheria
- Died: c. January 1878 near Janos, Chihuahua
- Other names: Peñon
- Occupation: military leader
- Years active: 1870s

Pionsenay (c. 1830–c. 1878) was a Chiricahua Apache war chief from Arizona. He was a fierce raider who advocated for war against the Americans, in opposition to the sons of Cochise who advocated for peace. Pionsenay killed several white men including U.S. Army Sergeant Orizoba Spence. His actions sparked the Americans' forced relocation of the Chiricahua to the San Carlos Apache Indian Reservation.

== Background ==
Pionsenay was the brother of Skinya, also a leader in the Chiricahua band of Apache. In 1872, he had acted as a peace envoy of Cochise at the town of Janos, Chihuahua, Mexico. After the death of Cochise, Pionsenay remained loyal to his brother during the schism between Skinya and Tahzay in 1875. The brothers and their allies relocated to the Dragoon Mountains in southeastern Arizona.

== Sulphur Springs raid ==
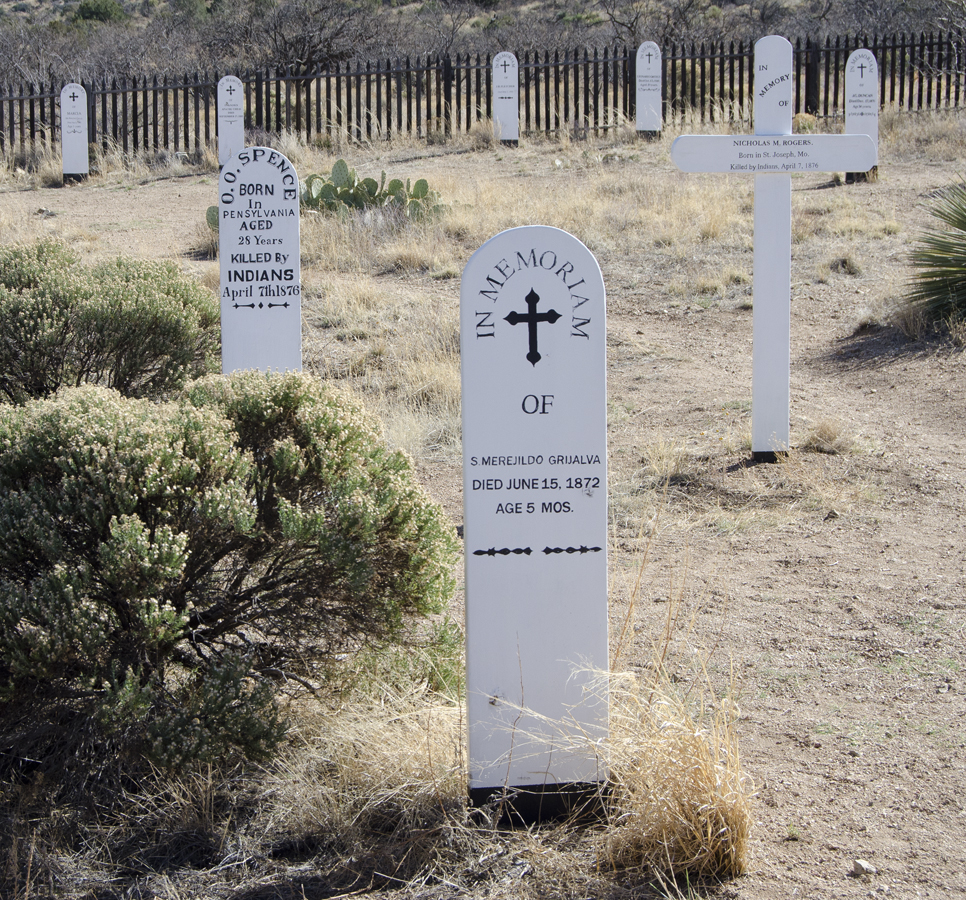
Grave markers for O. Spence (left) and N. Rogers (right) at Fort Bowie Cemetery

In 1876, the Sulphur Springs overland mail station in the Arizona Territory was raided by a band of Apaches led by Pionsenay. The attack was instigated after an argument over whiskey sales. After Pionsenay brought his whiskey back to camp, he quarreled with Skinya, and killed his two sisters when they tried to intervene. On April 7, Pionsenay returned to the station and shot and killed Orizoba Spence, the cook, and Nicholas Rogers, the station operator. The two were initially buried at the station, however, the bodies were later exhumed for interment at Fort Bowie. Pionsenay raided further down the San Pedro River, killed two more men, and stole several horses. He was unsuccessfully pursued by soldiers from Fort Bowie. The governor of the Arizona Territory subsequently demanded the removal of the Chiricahua.

== Pursuit by John Clum ==
John Clum, an Indian agent for the San Carlos Apache Indian Reservation, was sent to pursue Pionsenay and the rest of the Chiricahua in May 1876. He had the goal of relocating the band to his reservation. Skinya and Pionsenay argued with the sons of Cochise, Naiche and Tahzay, about how to proceed. Skinya and Pionsenay wanted to continue the war, while Naiche and Tahzay sought to surrender. Skinya was killed when Naiche shot him in the head. Pionsenay was shot in the shoulder by Tahzay, critically wounding him. Pionsenay fled with those loyal to him and refused to follow the sons of Cochise to the reservation.

On June 8, an injured Pionsenay sent a delegate to Clum. Pionsenay wished to negotiate peace, but Clum stated he would not accept anything less than unconditional surrender. Clum sent the delegate back with Tauelclyee and his posse to retrieve Pionsenay "alive, if convenient". Tauelclyee was successful. On June 13, Clum delivered Pionsenay to the custody of sheriff Charles A. Shibell for transportation to a jail in Tucson. Pionsenay escaped soon after.

Clum returned to pursue Pionsenay, but was unsuccessful. Although he was overall satisfied with how his mission went, he later stated that, "had not Pionsenay escaped I think my feelings would verge on ecstacy."

In May 1877, Clum had tracked Pionsenay's band to Ojo Caliente, New Mexico. Clum continued to arrest and transport the Apache to his reservation, including nine members of Pionsenay's posse. Pionseney himself continued to elude Clum.

== Further resistance and death ==
The military pursued Pionsenay throughout the Dragoon and Chiricahua Mountains. It is possible that he rode with Zebina Streeter, known as the 'White Apache'. On September 1, 1877, Pionsenay met with fellow Apache leader Nolgee who had surrendered to the San Carlos reservation. Pionsenay convinced Nolgee and his followers to leave, and the group stole horses from the American-loyal White Mountain Apache Tribe to aid with their departure. The White Mountain band followed and recaptured several people and horses, but Nolgee and Pionsenay escaped to Steins Peak. They continued to raid, killing 13 people in the process. They descended down to Mexico with Juh.

Around January 1878, Pionsenay was killed in a battle near the town of Janos, Chihuahua. He was possibly scalped by commander José Vasquez. Pionsenay was succeeded by an Apache named Broaches.
