= Taza (disambiguation) =

Taza is a city in Morocco.

Taza may also refer to:

- Taza (crater), on Mars
- Taza (Iraq), a town in Iraq
- Taza (Lydia), a town of ancient Lydia, now in Turkey
- Taza (film), 1954 American western a/k/a Taza, Son of Cochise
- Taza (Chiricahua leader), an Apache leader
- Taza National Park, in Algeria
