= Chato (Apache) =

Apache warrior and U.S. Army scout

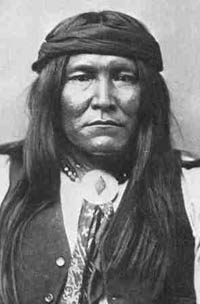

Chiricahua leader

Personal details
- Born: c. 1854 Apacheria
- Died: 13 August 1934 (aged 79–80) Mescalero Apache Reservation, New Mexico
- Cause of death: automobile accident
- Nickname: Alfred Chatto

Chato (Spanish nickname: "flat", Chatto or Chatta, c. 1854 – 13 August 1934) was a Chiricahua Apache subchief who carried out several raids on settlers in Arizona in the 1870s. His Apache name was Bidayajislnl or Pedes-klinje. He was a protege of Cochise, and he surrendered with Cochise in 1872 going to live on the San Carlos Reservation in southern Arizona, where he became an Apache Scout. Following his service as a scout he was taken prisoner after being coerced to travel to Washington, D.C. Chato was imprisoned in St. Augustine, Florida along with almost 500 other Apache at Fort Marion.

== Early life ==
Chato was a first cousin to Mangas Coloradas. He married a Chokonen Apache woman and pledged his loyalty to Cochise. He wanted to ascend to Chief of the Warm Springs Apache following the death of Victorio, but was succeeded by Nana.

Since 1876, the Chiricahua Apaches theoretically lived at the San Carlos Reservation in southeastern Arizona, where supplies were inadequate, diseases rife, and politics corrupt. Many escaped to the Sierra Madre Mountains of northern Mexico, where they supported themselves by raiding and plundering on both sides of the border.

After the arrest of Noch-del-klinne and the rebellion of the Apache scouts, Chato slipped away from the reservation with other Apache such as Juh, Naiche, and Geronimo, who feared for their lives.

The McComas massacre was the name given to an incident which occurred in southwestern New Mexico Territory on the afternoon of March 28, 1883. Former Union soldier and a prior judge, Hamilton C. McComas, his wife Juanita and six-year-old son Charlie were attacked by a Chiricahua war party led by Chato while on the road between Silver City and Lordsburg, New Mexico. McComas died of gunshot wounds and his wife was killed by a blow to the head. The fate of Charlie was never ascertained as there were a variety of conflicting reports. The incident made national headlines at the time.

== Army scout ==
General George Crook and 250 men attacked Chato's ranchera in June 1883, so Chato surrendered with Geronimo and others to General Crook. Chato then served under General Crook as a scout, including the subsequent expedition into the Sierra Madre after Geronimo in 1886.

Upon his return to Arizona, Chato led a peace delegation to Washington where he was presented with a silver medal by President Grover Cleveland. On his way back, at Fort Leavenworth he was arrested and deported to Fort Marion in Florida, then to Fort Pickens in Florida, then moved to Mount Vernon, Alabama.

It is not too much to say that the surrender of Natchez [sic:Naiche], Geronimo and their bands could not have been effected except for the assistance of Chato and his Chiricahua scouts. For their allegiance, they have been rewarded by captivity in a strange land.

— General Crook, U. S. Serial No. 2682, Doc. 35. p. 3

In 1894 Chato and his family were allowed to move to Fort Sill, in Oklahoma, and in 1913 Chato and his family opted to go out to the Mescalero Reservation in New Mexico.

On August 13, 1934 Chato's Ford Model T went off the road outside Whitetail, New Mexico, on the Mescalero Apache Reservation; he died at the scene.

== Popular culture ==
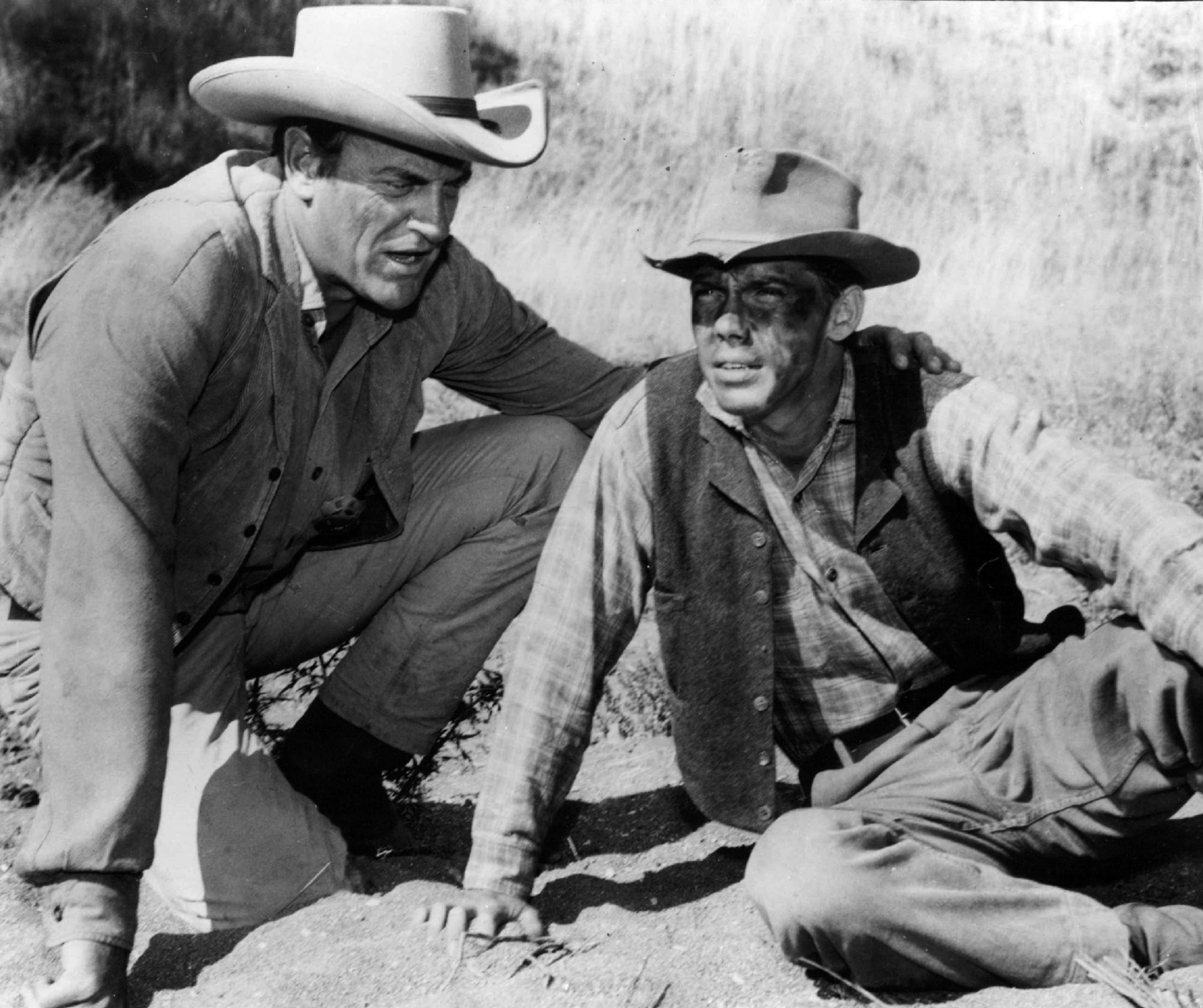
Ricardo Montalbán as Chato (right) in an episode of Gunsmoke

Louis L'Amour mentioned Chato in his 1962 novel Shalako. Chato is mentioned as an Apache who is planning to attack settlers in the New Mexico region.

In 1966, John Hoyt starred as a fictional Chato (the name was slightly altered to "Chata") in the American Western film Duel at Diablo.

Woody Strode played a fictional Chato in the 1968 British Western Shalako, with Sean Connery and Brigitte Bardot, filmed in Almería, Spain.

In 1970, Ricardo Montalbán guest starred as a fictional Chato on the American television program Gunsmoke.

Steve Reevis played Chato in the movie Geronimo: An American Legend starring Wes Studi, Jason Patric, Gene Hackman, Robert Duvall, and Matt Damon.

Chato was also played by Charles Bronson in Chato's Land.
