= Chiricahua =

Band of Apache Native Americans

Chiricahua Nde
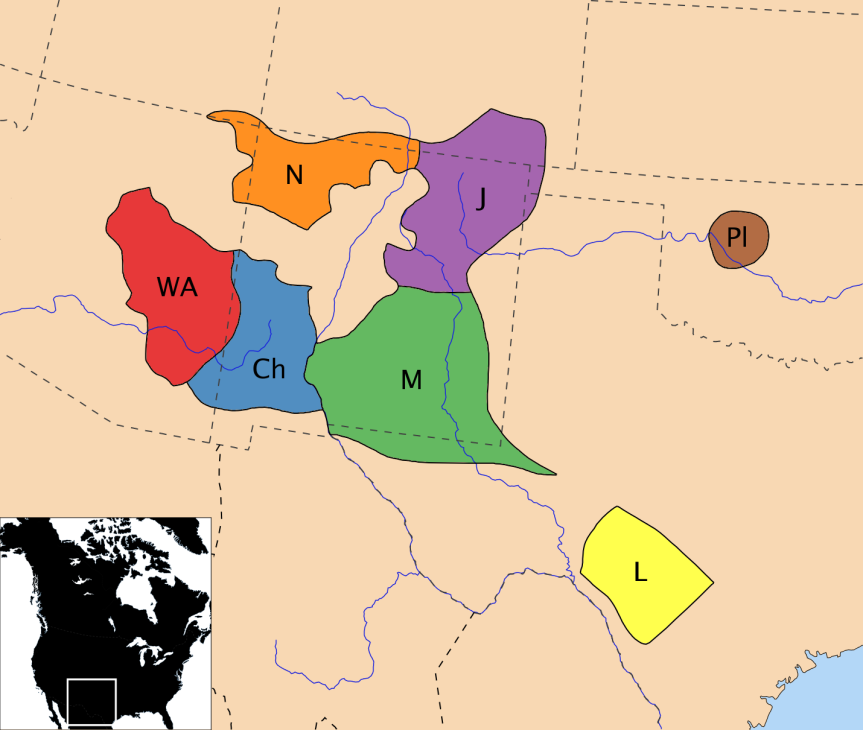
- Location of Apache tribes in the late 18th century (Ch – Chiricahua, WA – Western Apache, M – Mescalero, J – Jicarilla, L – Lipan, Pl – Plains Apache, N – Navajo, a separate people speaking a related language)

Total population
- 4,079, self-identified

Regions with significant populations
- United States, (Oklahoma, New Mexico)
- Fort Sill: 1,662
- New Mexico: 149

Languages
- Chiricahua Apache language, English, Spanish

Religion
- Christianity, Native American Church, Indigenous religion

Related ethnic groups
- Plains Apache, Jicarilla Apache, Lipan Apache, Mescalero Apache, Western Apache, Navajo

The Chiricahua (/ˌtʃɪrɪˈkɑːwə/ CHIRR-i-KAH-wə) are a band of Apache Native Americans.

Based in the Southern Plains and Southwestern United States, the Chiricahua historically shared a common area, language, customs, and intertwined family relations with their fellow Apaches. At the time of European contact, they had a territory of 15 million acres (61,000 km^{2}) in Southwestern New Mexico and Southeastern Arizona in the United States and in Northern Sonora and Chihuahua in Mexico.

Today Chiricahua live in Northern Mexico and in the United States where they are primarily enrolled in three federally recognized tribes: the Fort Sill Apache Tribe, located near Apache, Oklahoma, with a small reservation outside Deming, New Mexico; the Mescalero Apache Tribe of the Mescalero Reservation near Ruidoso, New Mexico; and the San Carlos Apache Tribe in southeastern Arizona.

== Name ==
The Chiricahua Apache, also written as Chiricagui, Apaches de Chiricahui, Chiricahues, Chilicague, Chilecagez, and Chiricagua, were given that name by the Spanish. The White Mountain Coyotero Apache, including the Cibecue and Bylas groups of the Western Apache, referred to the Chiricahua by the name Ha'i’ą́há, while the San Carlos Apache called them Hák'ą́yé which means ″Eastern Sunrise″, or ″People in the East″. Sometimes they adapted this appellation and referred to themselves also as Ha’ishu Na gukande ('Sunrise People'). The Mescalero Apache called the Western Apache and Chiricahua bands to their west Shá'i'áõde ("Western Apache People", "The People of the Sunset", "The People of the West"), when referring only to Chiricahuas they used Ch'úk'ânéõde ("People of a ridge or mountainside [made of loose rocks]") or sometimes Tã'aa'ji k'ee'déõkaa'õde ("The Ones who are Covered [with breech cloths]"). Navajo refer to the Chiricahua as Chíshí ("Southern People").

The Chiricahua autonym, or name by which they refer to themselves, is simply (depending on dialect) Nde, Ne, Néndé, Héndé, Hen-de or õne ("The People, Men", "the People of"); they never called themselves ″Apaches". The Chiricahua referred to outsiders, such as Americans, Mexicans or other Indians, as Enee, ⁿdáa or Indah / N'daa. This word has two possible meanings, the first being "strange people, non-Apache people" or "enemy", but another being "eye". Sometimes it is said that all Apaches referred to the Americans and European settlers (with exception of the Mexicans) as Bi'ndah-Li'ghi' / Bi'nda-li'ghi'o'yi ("White Eyes"), but this seems a name from Mescalero and Lipan Apache bands, as the Chiricahua bands called them Daadatlijende, meaning "Blue/green eye people" or Indaaɫigáí / Indaaɫigánde meaning "White skinned or pale colored people" or literally "Strange, non-Apache people, which are white-skinned"). Łigáí means "it is white" or it can be translate as "it is pale colored". The í on the end usually translates as "the one that is", but in the context of human beings, can mean "the group who are".

== Language ==
The Chiricahua language (n'dee biyat'i) is a Southern Athabaskan language from the Na-dene language family. It is very closely related to Mescalero, and more distantly related to Western Apache. It's considered a national language of Mexico and is regulated by the Instituto Nacional de Lenguas Indígenas.

== Culture and organization ==
Several loosely affiliated bands of Apache came improperly to be usually known as Chiricahuas. These included the Chokonen (recte: Tsokanende), the Chihenne (recte: Tchihende), the Nednai (Nednhi) and Bedonkohe (recte, both of them together: Ndendahe). Today, all are commonly referred to as Chiricahua, but they were not historically a single band nor the same Apache division, being more correctly identified, all together, as "Central Apaches".

Many other bands and groups of Apachean language-speakers ranged over eastern Arizona and the American Southwest. The bands that are grouped under the Chiricahua term today had much history together: they intermarried and lived alongside each other, and they also occasionally fought with each other. They formed short-term as well as longer alliances that have caused scholars to classify them as one people.

The Apachean groups and the Navajo peoples were part of the Athabaskan migration into the North American continent from Asia, across the Bering Strait from Siberia. As the people moved south and east into North America, groups splintered off and became differentiated by language and culture over time. Some anthropologists believe that the Lipan Apache and the Navajo were pushed south and west into what is now New Mexico and Arizona by pressure from other Great Plains Indians, such as the Comanche and Kiowa. Among the last of such splits were those that resulted in the formation of the different Apachean bands whom the later Europeans encountered: the southwestern Apache groups and the Navajo. Although both speaking forms of Southern Athabaskan, the Navajo and Apache have become culturally distinct.

The "Chihenne (Tchihende)", "Nednai/Nednhi (Ndendahe)" and "Bedonkohe" intermarried sometimes with Mescalero Bands of New Mexico and Chihuahua and formed alliances with them; therefore their Mescalero kin did know the names of Chiricahua bands and local groups: Chíhéõde ("The People of Red Ceremonial Paint", "The Red Ceremonial Paint People"), Ndé'ndaa'õde / Ndé'ndaaõde ("The Apache People (who live among) Enemies") and Bidáõ'kaõde / Bidáõ'kahéõde ("The People whom We Met", "The People whom We Came Upon"), The Mescalero use the term -õde, -éõde, -néõde, or -héõde ("the people of") instead of the Chiricahua Nde, Ne, Néndé, Héndé, Hen-de or õne ("the people of").

=== Dances ===
Chiricahuas from Mexico participate every year in the Fiesta de los Remedios in Comonfort, Guanajuato representing and performing their traditional dances and other ceremonies.

=== Religion ===
The major Chiricahuan deity is called Ussen, an all-powerful creator figure. Other figures in Chiricahuan mythology include White Painted Woman, a virgin who offered herself in sacrifice to end a drought, and her son, Child of the Waters.

Hoddentin, ceremonially prepared cattail pollen, is used in many Chiricahuan rituals. John Gregory Bourke recorded that the Chiricahua offered hoddentin to the sun, threw it after snakes, and used it in medicine dances and around dying people.

Other traditional practices include death rituals and puberty ceremonies for young women. Caves, waterways, and birthplaces hold special spiritual significance.

== History ==
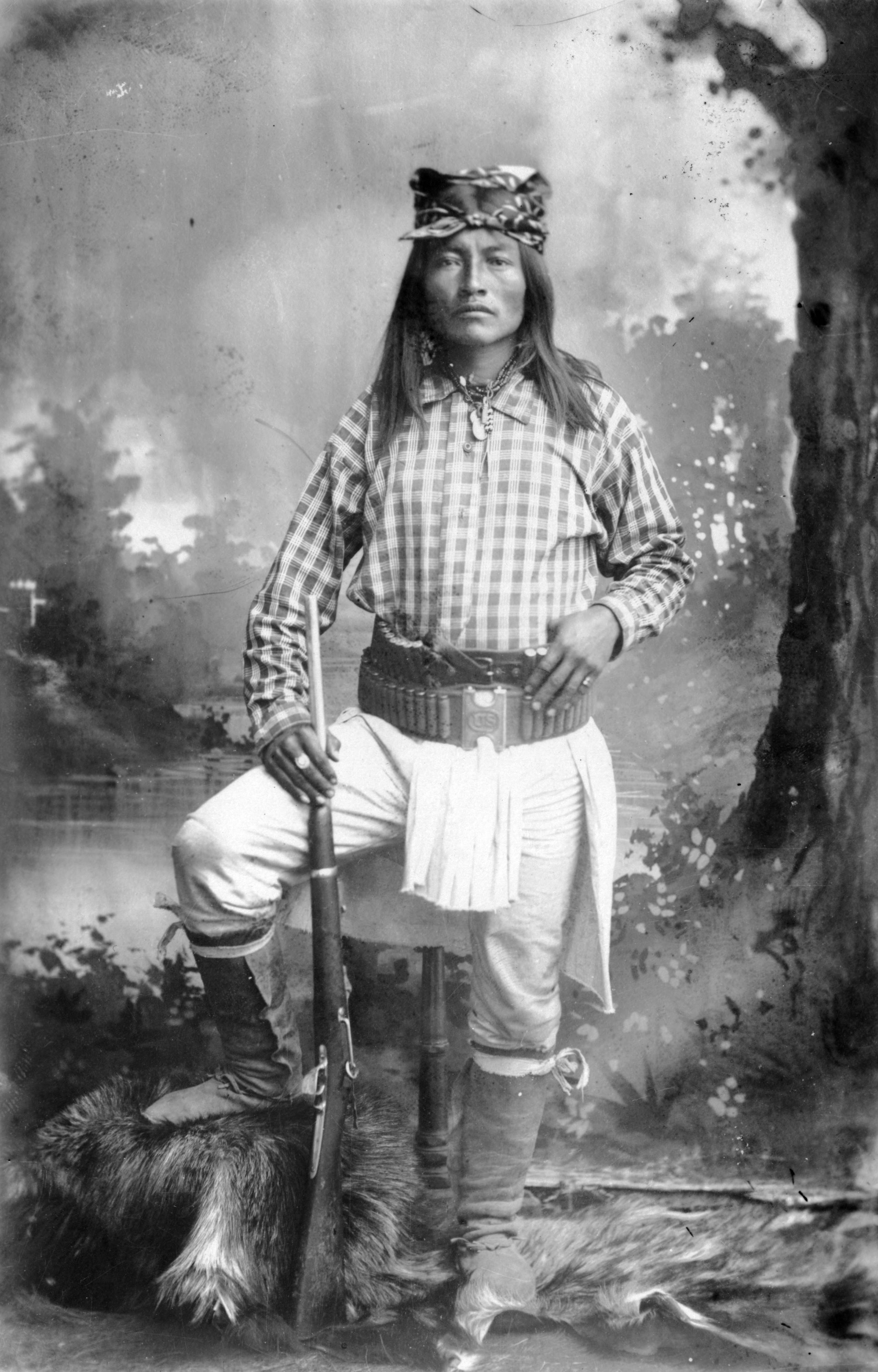
Ba-keitz-ogie (Yellow Coyote), U.S. Army Scout

=== Great Migration ===
The Athabaskan ancestors of the Chiricahua people migrated south from Canada along the Rocky Mountains. Historians disagree on the exact dates of the migration, with estimates ranging from the early 1100s to about 1500. Historian Jack D. Forbes speculates that there may have been two or more mass migrations during this time period.

=== 18th century ===
The Tsokanende (Chiricahua) Apache division was once led, from the beginning of the 18th century, by chiefs such as Pisago Cabezón, Relles, Posito Moraga, Yrigollen, Tapilá, Teboca, Vívora, Miguel Narbona, Esquinaline, and finally Cochise (whose name was derived from the Apache word Cheis, meaning "having the quality of oak") and, after his death, his sons Tahzay and, later, Naiche, under the guardianship of Cochise's war chief and brother-in-law Nahilzay, and the independent chiefs Chihuahua, Ulzana, Skinya and Pionsenay; Tchihende (Mimbreño) people was led, during the same period, by chiefs as Juan José Compa, Fuerte also known as Soldado Fiero, Mangas Coloradas, Cuchillo Negro, Delgadito, Ponce, Nana, Victorio, Loco, Mangus; Ndendahe (Mogollón and Carrizaleño / Janero) Apache people, in the meanwhile, was led by Mahko and, after him, Mano Mocha, Coleto Amarillo, Luis, Laceres, Felipe, Natiza, and finally Juh and Goyaałé (known to the Americans as Geronimo). After Victorio's death, Nana, Gerónimo, Mangus (youngest Mangas Coloradas' son) and youngest Cochise's son Naiche were the last leaders of the Central Apaches, and their mixed Apache group was the last to continue to resist U.S. government control of the American Southwest.

=== European-Apache relations ===
From the beginning of European-Apache relations, there was conflict between them. The two groups contested the control of land and trade routes in Apacheria, and their cultural differences made it oftentimes difficult to negotiate treaties and policies between. Their encounters were preceded by more than 100 years of Spanish colonial and Mexican incursions and settlement on the Apache lands, which pushed Apache tribes northward and exacerbated the martial nature of their society. The United States settlers were newcomers to the competition for land and resources in the Southwest, but they inherited its complex history, and brought their own attitudes with them about American Indians and how to use the land. By the Treaty of Guadalupe Hidalgo of 1848, the US took on the responsibility to prevent and punish cross-border incursions by Apache who were raiding in Mexico.

The Apache viewed the United States colonists with ambivalence, and in some cases enlisted them as allies in the early years against the Mexicans. In 1852, the US and some of the Chiricahua signed a treaty, but it had little lasting effect. During the 1850s, American miners and settlers began moving into Chiricahua territory, beginning encroachment that had been renewed in the migration to the Southwest of the previous two decades.

This forced the Apachean people to change their lives as nomads, free on the land. The US Army defeated them and forced them into the confinement of reservation life, on lands ill-suited for subsistence farming, which the US proffered as the model of civilization. Today, the Chiricahua are preserving their culture as much as possible, while forging new relationships with the peoples around them. The Chiricahua are considereda part of the greater American whole and yet distinct based on their history and culture.

=== Hostilities ===
Chiricahua Apache

Although they had lived peaceably with most Americans in the New Mexico Territory up to about 1860, the Chiricahua became increasingly hostile to American encroachment in the Southwest after a number of provocations had occurred between them.

In 1835, Mexico had placed a bounty on Apache scalps which further inflamed the situation. In 1837 Warm Springs Mimbreños' head chief and famed raider Soldado Fiero also known as Fuerte was killed by Mexican soldiers of the garrison at Janos (only two days' travel from Santa Rita del Cobre), and his son Cuchillo Negro succeeded him as head chief and went to war against Chihuahua for revenge. In the same 1837, the American John (also known as James) Johnson invited the Coppermine Mimbreños in the Pinos Altos area to trade with his party (near the mines at Santa Rita del Cobre, New Mexico) and, when they gathered around a blanket on which pinole (a ground corn flour) had been placed for them, Johnson and his men opened fire on the Chihenne with rifles and a concealed cannon loaded with scrap iron, glass, and a length of chain. They killed about 20 Apache, including the chief Juan José Compá. Mangas Coloradas is said to have witnessed this attack, which inflamed his and other Apache warriors' desires for vengeance for many years; he led the survivors to safety and subsequently, together with Cuchillo Negro, took Mimbreño revenge. The historian Rex W. Strickland argued that the Apache had come to the meeting with their own intentions of attacking Johnson's party, but were taken by surprise. In 1839 scalp-hunter James Kirker was employed by Robert McKnight to re-open the road to Santa Rita del Cobre.

After the conclusion of the US/Mexican War (1848) and the Gadsden Purchase (1853), Americans began to enter the territory in greater numbers. This increased the opportunities for incidents and misunderstandings. The Apaches, including Mangas Coloradas and Cuchillo Negro, were not at first hostile to the Americans, considering them enemies of their own Mexican enemies.

Cuchillo Negro, with Ponce, Delgadito, Victorio and other Mimbreño chiefs, signed a treaty at Fort Webster in April 1853, but, during the spring of 1857 the U.S. Army set out on a campaign, led by Col. Benjamin L.E. deBonneville, Col. Dixon S. Miles (3°Cavalry from Fort Thorn) and Col. William W. Loring (commanding a Mounted Rifles Regiment from Albuquerque), against Mogollon and Coyotero Apaches: Loring's Pueblo Indian scouts found and attacked an Apache rancheria in the Canyon de Los Muertos Carneros (May 25, 1857), where Cuchillo Negro and some Mimbreño Apache were resting after a raid against the Navahos. Some Apaches, including Cuchillo Negro himself, were killed.

In December 1860, after several bad incidents provoked by the miners led by James H. Tevis in the Pinos Altos area, Mangas Coloradas went to Pinos Altos, New Mexico to try to convince the miners to move away from the area he loved and to go to the Sierra Madre and seek gold there, but they tied him to a tree and whipped him badly. His Mimbreño and Ndendahe followers and related Chiricahua bands were incensed by the treatment of their respected chief. Mangas had been just as great a chief in his prime (during the 1830s and 1840s), along with Cuchillo Negro, as Cochise was then becoming.

In 1861, the US Army seized and killed some of Cochise's relatives near Apache Pass, in what became known as the Bascom Affair. Remembering how Cochise had escaped, the Chiricahua called the incident "cut the tent." In 1863, Gen. James H. Carleton set out leading a new campaign against the Mescalero Apache, and Capt. Edmund Shirland (10°California Cavalry) invited Mangas Coloradas for a "parley" but, after he entered the U.S. camp to negotiate a peace, the great Mimbreño chief was arrested and convicted in Fort McLane, where, probably on Gen. Joseph R. West's orders, Mangas Coloradas was killed by American soldiers (Jan. 18, 1863). His body was mutilated by the soldiers, and his people were enraged by his murder. The Chiricahuas began to consider the Americans as "enemies we go against them." From that time, they waged almost constant war against US settlers and the Army for the next 23 years. Cochise, his brother-in-law Nahilzay (war chief of Cochise's people), Chihuahua, Skinya, Pionsenay, Ulzana and other warring chiefs became a nightmare to settlers and military garrisons and patrols. In the meantime, the great Victorio, Delgadito (soon killed in 1864), Nana, Loco, young Mangus (last son of Mangas Coloradas) and other minor chiefs led on the warpath the Mimbreños, Chiricahuas' cousins and allies, and Juh led the Ndendahe (Nednhi and Bedonkohe together).

In 1872, General Oliver O. Howard, with the help of Thomas Jeffords, succeeded in negotiating a peace with Cochise. On December 14, 1872, President Ulysses Grant issued an Executive Order establishing the Chiricahua Reservation in the southeast Arizona Territory encompassing the Chiricahua Mountains, Mexico–United States border, and New Mexico Territory border. Jeffords and John Clum were designated as the U.S. Indian Agents for the Chiricahua Reservation residing near Apache Pass, Arizona and Fort Bowie. It remained open for about 4 years, during which the chief Cochise died (from natural causes). In 1876, about two years after Cochise's death, the US moved the Chiricahua and some other Apache bands to the San Carlos Apache Indian Reservation, still in Arizona. This was in response to public outcry after the killings of Orizoba Spence and Nicholas Rogers at Sulpher Springs. The mountain people hated the desert environment of San Carlos, and some frequently began to leave the reservation and sometimes raided neighboring settlers.

They surrendered to General Nelson Miles in 1886. The best-known warrior leader of the "renegades", although he was not considered a 'chief', was the forceful and influential Geronimo. He and Naiche (the son of Cochise and hereditary leader after Tahzay's death) together led many of the resisters during those last few years of freedom.

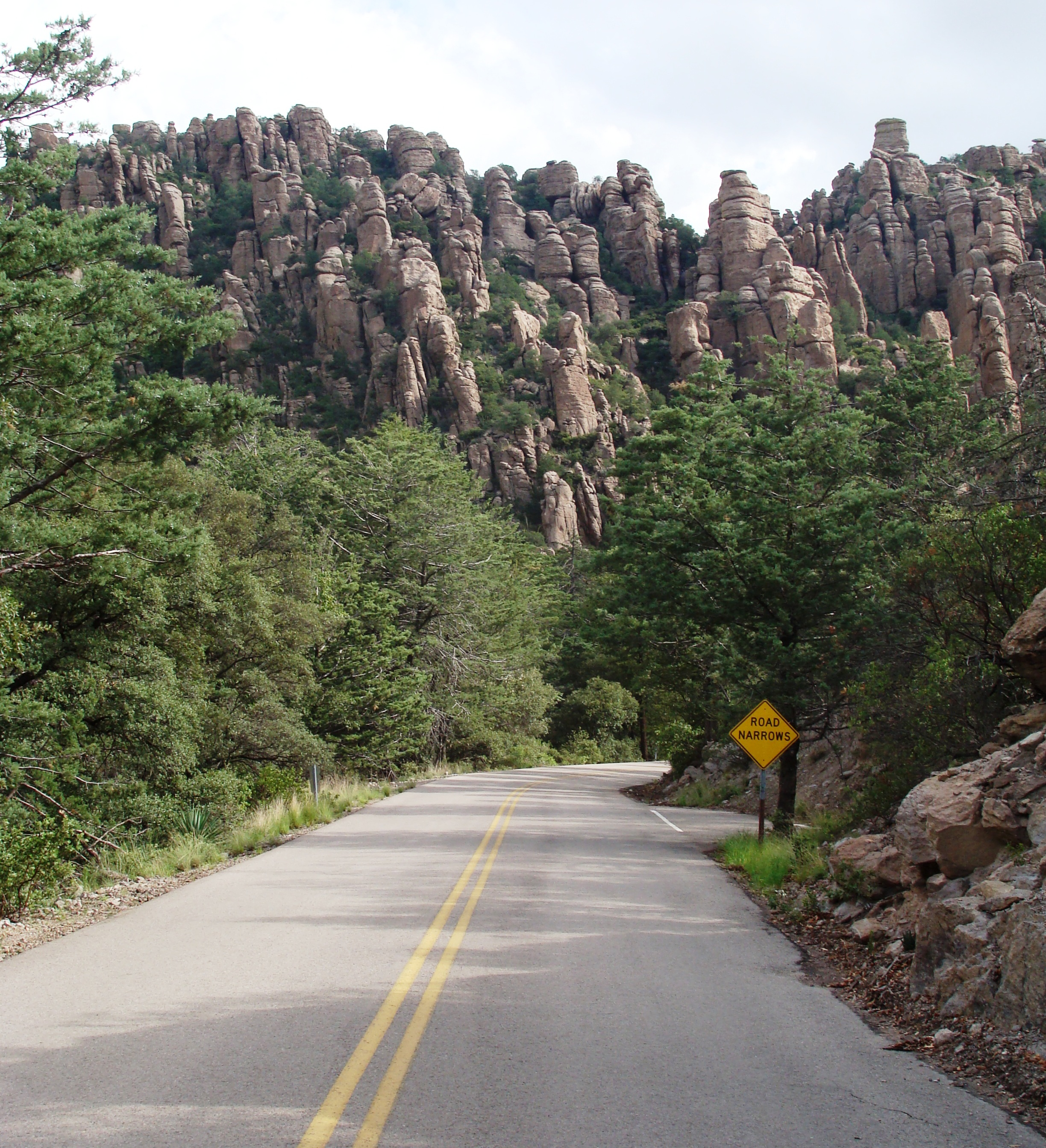
Chiricahua National Monument entrance roadway

They made a stronghold in the Chiricahua Mountains, part of which is now inside Chiricahua National Monument, and across the intervening Willcox Playa to the northeast, in the Dragoon Mountains (all in southeastern Arizona). In late frontier times, the Chiricahua ranged from San Carlos and the White Mountains of Arizona, to the adjacent mountains of southwestern New Mexico around what is now Silver City, and down into the mountain sanctuaries of the Sierra Madre (of northern Mexico). There they often joined with their Nednai Apache kin.

General George Crook, then General Miles' troops, aided by Apache scouts from other groups, pursued the exiles until they gave up. Mexico and the United States had negotiated an agreement allowing their troops in pursuit of the Apache to continue into each other's territories. This prevented the Chiricahua groups from using the border as an escape route, and as they could gain little time to rest and consider their next move, the fatigue, attrition and demoralization of the constant hunt led to their surrender.

The final 34 hold-outs, including Geronimo and Naiche, surrendered to units of General Miles' forces in September 1886. From Bowie Station, Arizona, they were entrained, along with most of the other remaining Chiricahua (as well as the Army's Apache scouts), and exiled to Fort Marion, Florida. At least two Apache warriors, Massai and Gray Lizard, escaped from their prison car and made their way back to San Carlos Arizona in a 1,200-mile (1,900 km) journey to their ancestral lands.

After a number of Chiricahua deaths at the Fort Marion prison near St. Augustine, Florida, the survivors were moved, first to Alabama, and later to Fort Sill, Oklahoma. Geronimo's surrender ended the Indian Wars in the United States. However, another group of Chiricahua (also known as the Nameless Ones or Bronco Apache) were not captured by U.S. forces and refused to surrender. They escaped over the border to Mexico, and settled in the remote Sierra Madre mountains. There they built hidden camps, raided homes for cattle and other food supplies, and engaged in periodic firefights with units of the Mexican Army and police. Most were eventually captured or killed by soldiers or by private ranchers armed and deputized by the Mexican government.

Eventually, the surviving Chiricahua prisoners were moved to the Fort Sill military reservation in Oklahoma. In August 1912, by an act of the U.S. Congress, they were released from their prisoner of war status as they were thought to be no further threat. Although promised land at Fort Sill, they met resistance from local non-Apache. They were given the choice to remain at Fort Sill or to relocate to the Mescalero reservation near Ruidoso, New Mexico. Two-thirds of the group, 183 people, elected to go to New Mexico, while 78 remained in Oklahoma. Their descendants still reside in these places. At the time, they were not permitted to return to Arizona because of hostility from the long wars. in 1912 many different Apache bands returned to San Carlos Apache lands after their release from Fort Sill Apache Reservation.

== Bands ==
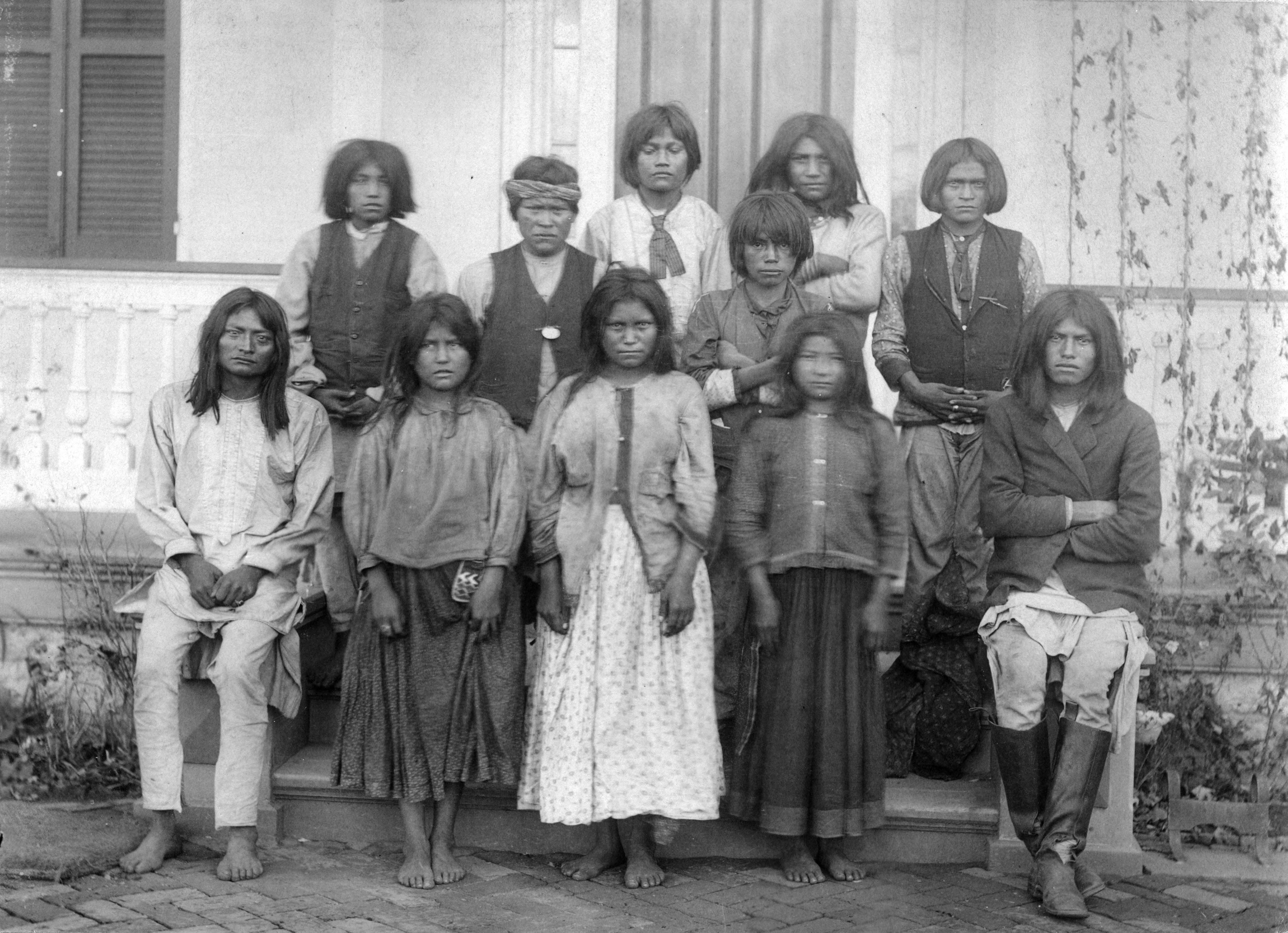
Chiricahua Apaches as they arrived at the Carlisle Indian School in Pennsylvania

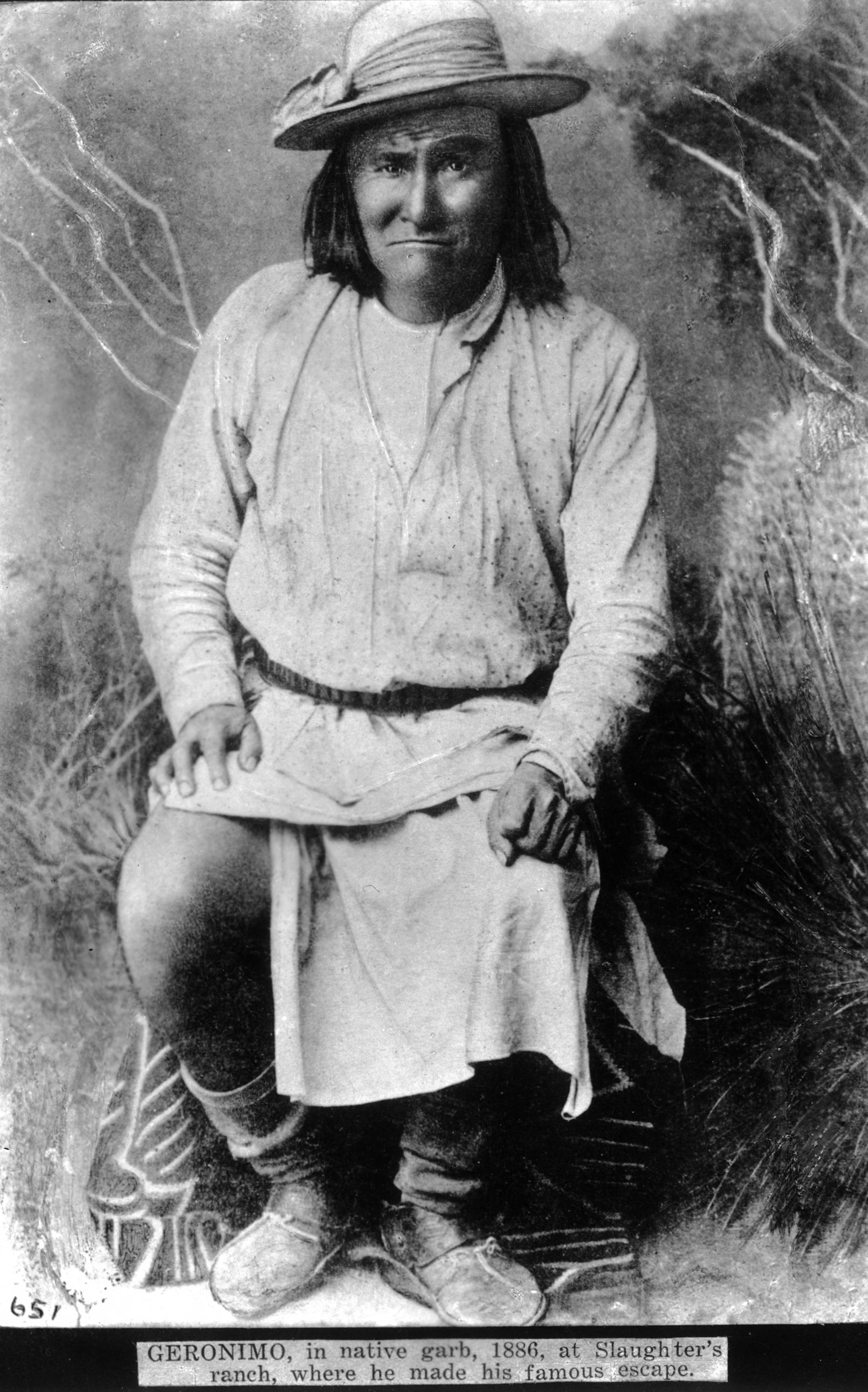
Goyaałé (Geronimo), in native garb

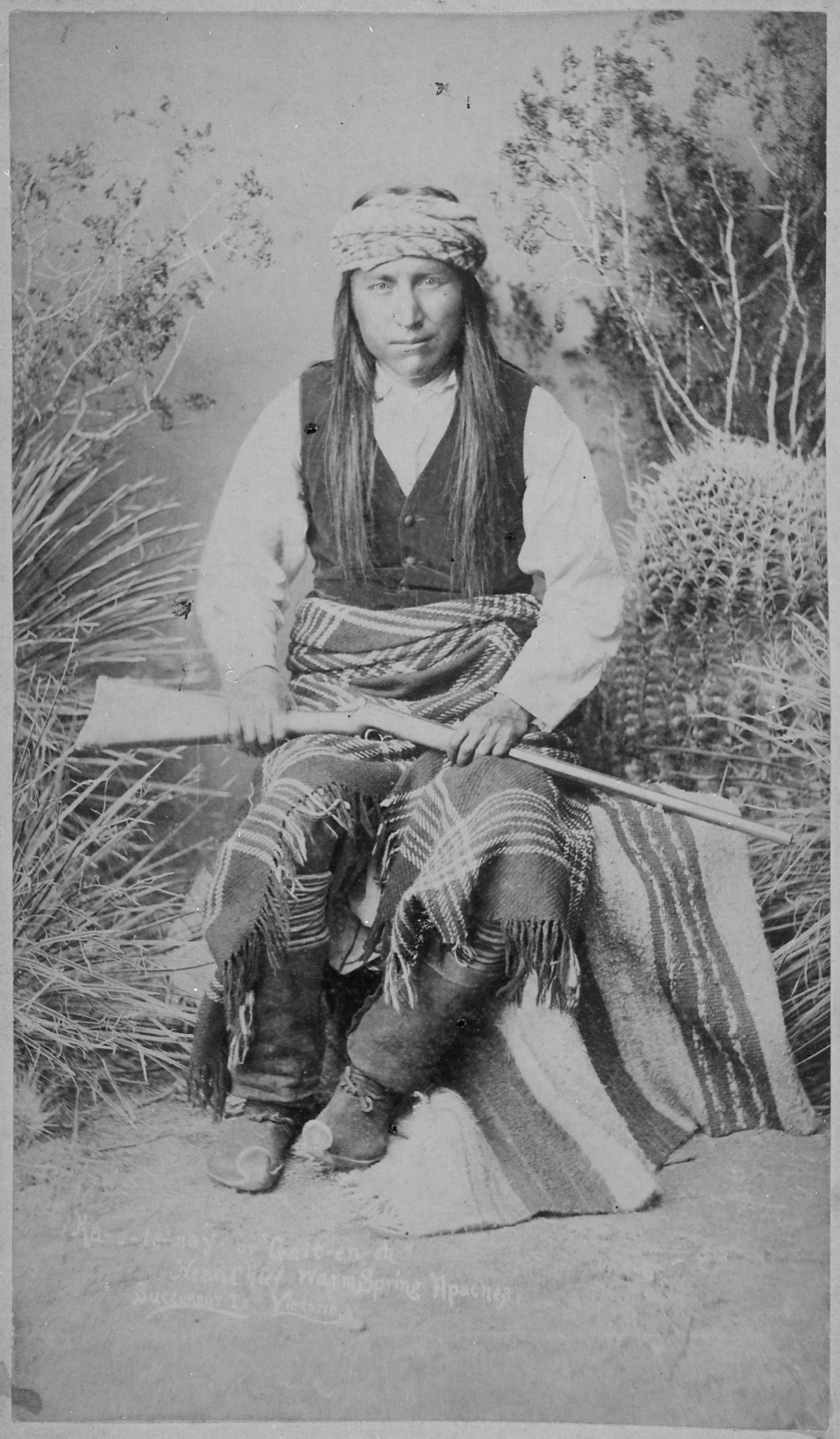
Ka-e-te-nay, Head Chief, Warm Springs Apaches

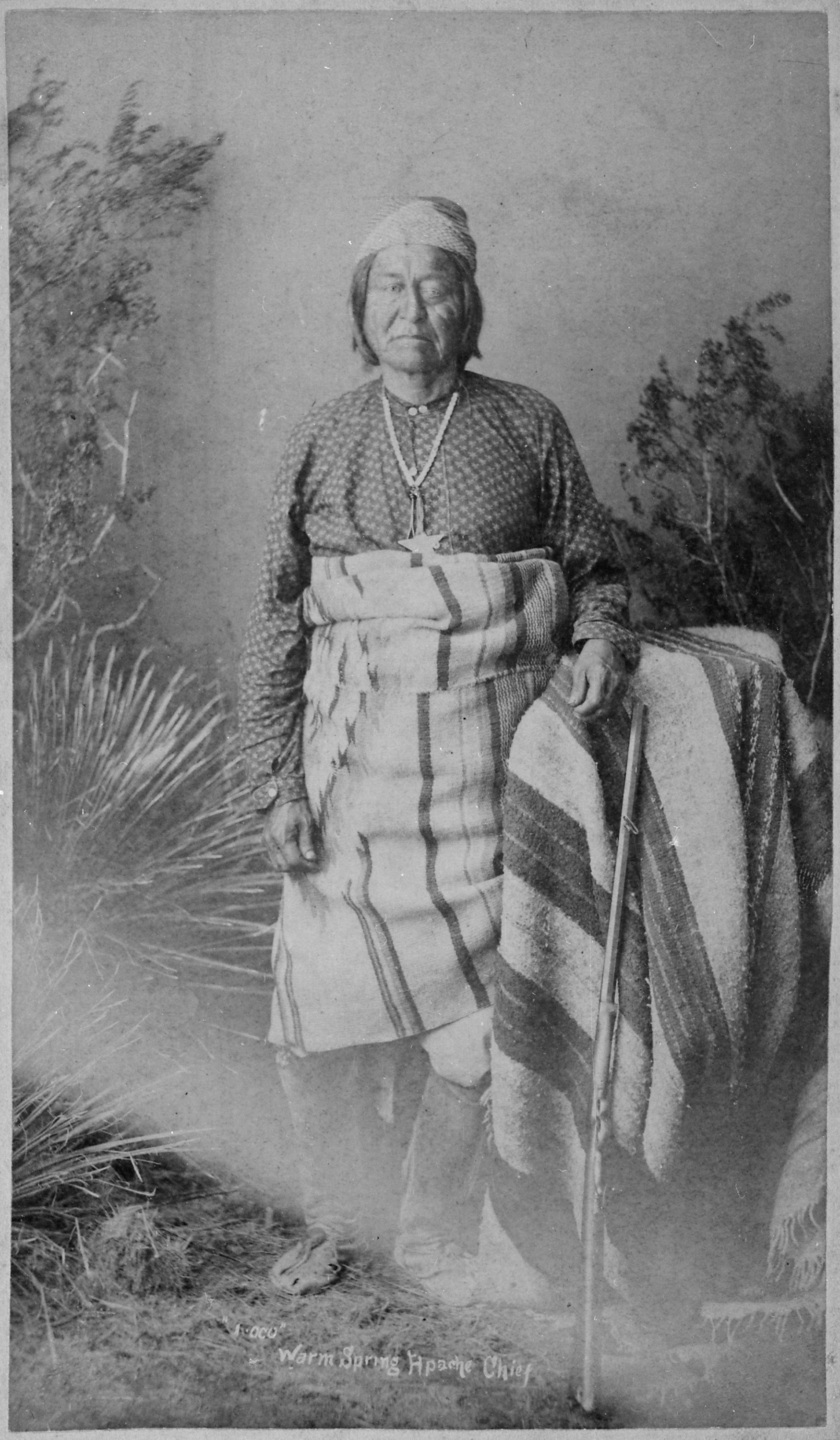
Loco, Warm Springs Apache chief

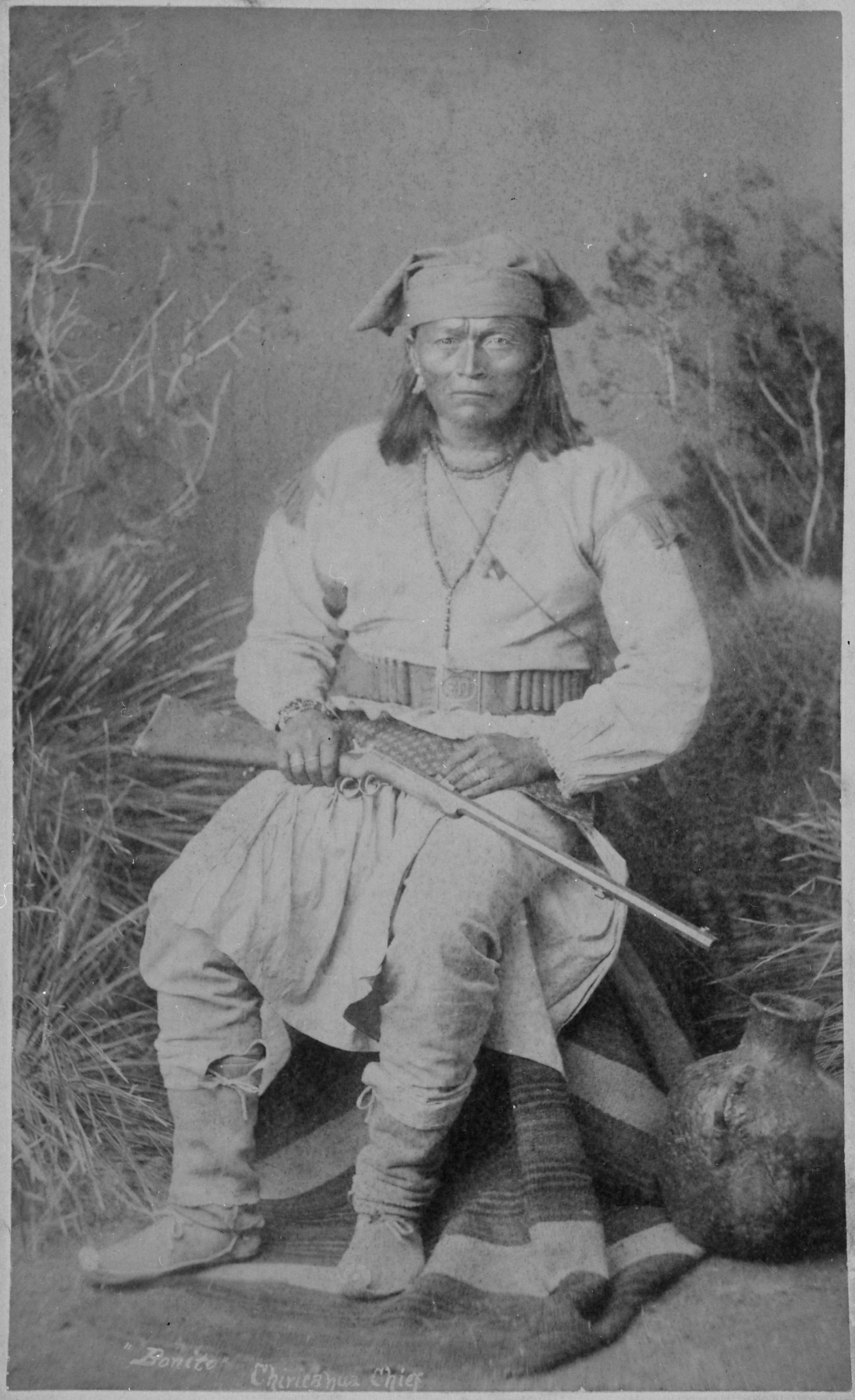
Bonito, Chiricahua chief

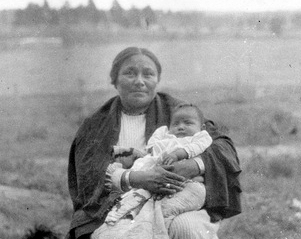
Viola and Agnes Chihuahua, Chiricahuas, photographed at the Mescalero Apache Reservation in 1916.

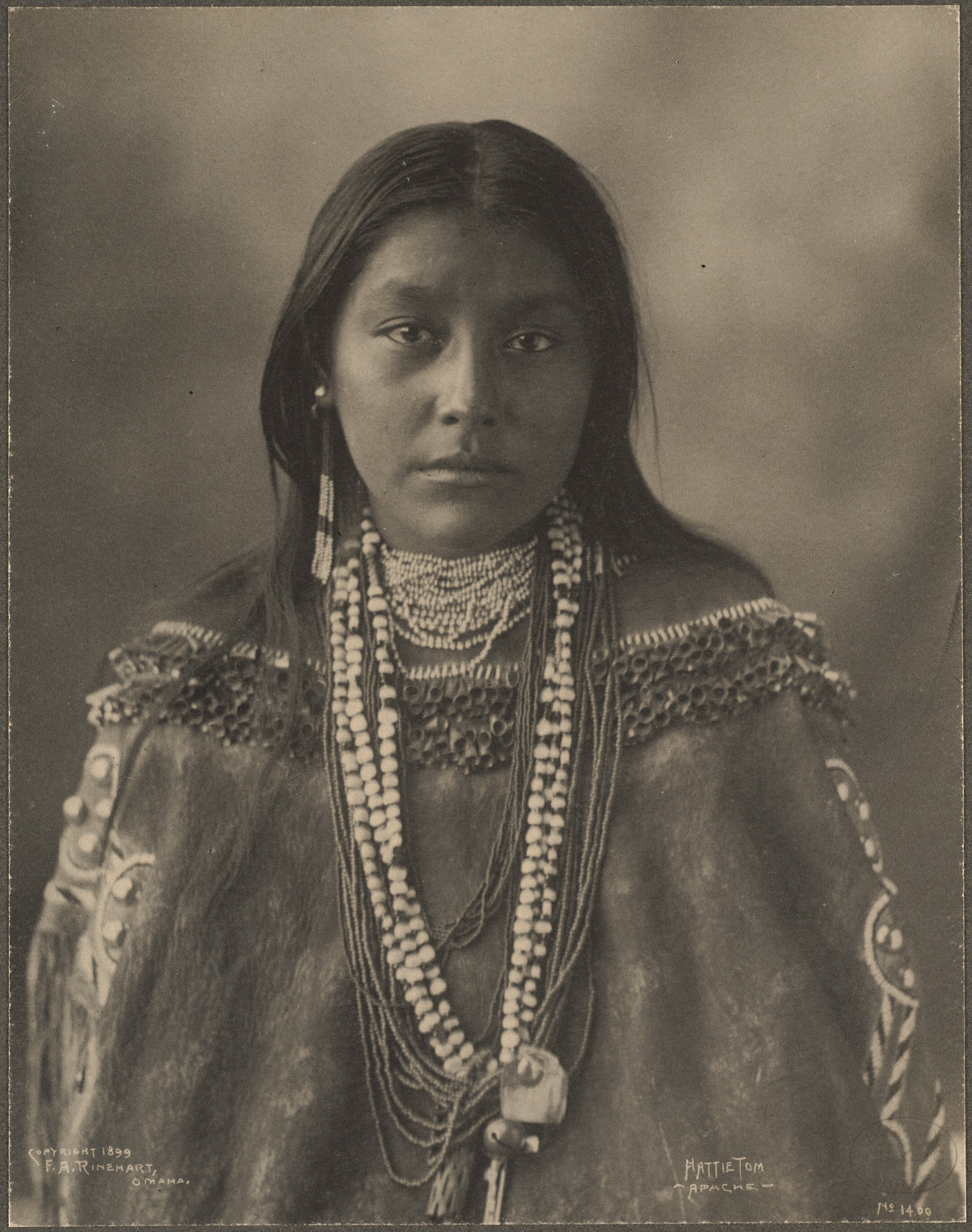
Hattie Tom, Chiricahua Apache, photographed by Frank Rinehart

In the Chiricahua culture, the "band" as a unit was much more important than the American or European concept of "tribe". The Chiricahua had no name for themselves (autonym) as a people. The name Chiricahua is most likely the Spanish rendering of the Opata word Chihuicahui or Chiguicagui ('mountain of the wild turkey') for the Chiricahua Mountains, later corrupted into Chiricahui/Chiricahua. The Chiricahua tribal territory encompassed today's SE Arizona, SW New Mexico, NE Sonora and NW Chihuahua. The Chiricahua range extended to the east as far as the Rio Grande Valley in New Mexico and to the west as far as the San Pedro River Valley in Arizona, north of Magdalena just below present day Hwy I-40 corridor in New Mexico and with the town Ciudad Madera (276 km northwest of the state capital, Chihuahua, and 536 km southwest of Ciudad Juárez (formerly known as Paso del Norte) on the Mexico–United States border), as their southernmost range.

According to Morris E. Opler (1941), the Chiricahuas consisted of three bands:

- Chíhéne or Chííhénee’ 'Red Paint People' (also known as Eastern Chiricahua, Warm Springs Apache, Gileños, Ojo Caliente Apache, Coppermine Apache, Copper Mine, Mimbreños, Mimbres, Mogollones, Tcihende),
- Ch'úk'ánéń or Ch'uuk'anén ‘Ridge of the Mountainside People’ (also known as Central Chiricahua, Ch'ók'ánéń, Cochise Apache, Chiricahua proper, Chiricaguis, Tcokanene), or the Sunrise People;
- Ndé'indaaí or Nédnaa'í 'Enemy People' or 'The Apache People (who live among) Enemies' known as the Southern Chiricahua, Pinery Apache, Bronco Apache, Ne'na'i), or "those ahead at the end".

Schroeder (1947) lists five bands:

- Mogollon
- Copper Mine
- Mimbres
- Warm Spring
- Chiricahua proper

The Chiricahua-Warm Springs Fort Sill Apache tribe in Oklahoma say they have four bands in Fort Sill: (some of the Arizona Apaches did not return to San Carlos or Fort Apache, White Mountain Apache warrior Eyelash is buried in Fort Sill cememtry, Southern Tonto Apache Chief/Scout Hosay is buried in Fort Apache cememtery, Hosay has family in Fort Sill and San Carlos today)

- Chíhéne (recte Tchi-he-nde, more correctly known as the Warm Springs and Coppermine Mimbreño bands, Chinde),
- Chukunen (recte Tsoka-ne-nde, also known as the Chiricahua band, Chokonende),
- Bidánku (recte Bedonkohe Ndendahe, also known as Bidanku, Bronco),
- Ndéndai (recte Nednhi Ndendahe, also known as Ndénai, Nednai).

Today they use the word Chidikáágu (derived from the Spanish word Chiricahua) to refer to the Chiricahua in general, and the word Indé, to refer to the Apache in general.

Other sources list these and additional bands (only the Chokonen and Chihuicahui local groups of the Chokonen band were considered by Chiricahua tribal members to be the real Chiricahua people):

- Chokonen, Chukunende or Tsokanende (also known as Ch’ók’ánéń, Tsoka-ne-nde, Tcokanene, Chu-ku-nde, Chukunen, Ch’úk’ánéń, Ch’uuk’anén, Chuukonende or Ch'úk'ânéõne – ‘Ridge of the Mountainside People’, proper or Central Chiricahua)
  - Chokonen local group (lived west of Safford, Arizona, along the upper reaches of the Gila River, along the San Francisco River in the north to the Mogollon Mountains in New Mexico in the east and the San Simon Valley to the southwest, northeastern local group – headed by Chief Chihuahua (Kla-esh) and his segundo (war chief) and brother Ulzana)
  - Chihuicahui group (lived in SE Arizona in the Huachuca Mountains ("Wa-CHOO-ka" Mountains; Apache name meaning "thunder mountain") west of the San Pedro River, in the northwest along a line of today's Benson, Johnson, Willcox, and north along the San Simon River to east of SW New Mexico, controlled the southern Pinaleño, Winchester, Dos Cabezas, Chiricahua, Dragoon and Mule Mountains, also known as Huachuca Mountains Apache or by the Apache name Shaiahene ("Western People", "Sunset People"), southwestern local group – headed by Cochise (Kùù'chish) ("[oak]wood") and after him by his sons, therefore known as Chishhéõne ("The People of Wood", "The Wood People") or Cochise Apache.)
    - Cai-a-he-ne local group (′Sun Goes Down People, i.e. People of the West′, were the westernmost of all Chihuicahui, western local group)
    - Tse-ga-ta-hen-de / Tséghát'ahéõne local group (′Rock Pocket People′, 'The People beside the Rocks', 'The People on the side of the Rocks', lived in the Chiricahua Mountains)
    - Dzil-dun-as-le-n / Tsétáguãgáõne local group (′Rocks at Foot of Grass-Expanse′, 'The People of the Plains among the Rocks', 'The People of Rocky Plains', 'The People among White Rocks', lived in the Dragoon Mountains – according to Christian Naiche Jr. this was Cochise's local group.)
  - Dzilmora local group (in SW New Mexico in the Alamo Hueco, Little Hatchet and in the Big Hatchet Mountains (which were known to the Apache as Dzilmora), southeastern local group)
  - Animas local group (lived south of the Rio Gila, and west of the San Simon Valley in the Peloncillo Mountains (called by Apache Dziltilcil – "Black Mountain") along the Arizona–New Mexico border south to the Guadalupe Canyon and eastward in the Animas Valley and Animas Mountains in SW New Mexico, southern local group)
  - local group (today no longer known by name) (lived in NE Sonora and adjacent Arizona, in Guadalupe Canyon, along the San Bernardino River, northwestern parts of the Sierra San Luis, in the Batepito Valley with the Sierra Pitaycachi, east of Fronteras, as their stronghold)
  - local group (today no longer known by name) (lived east of Fronteras in der Sierra Pilares de Teras in Sonora)
  - local group (today no longer known by name) (lived in the Sierra de los Ajos northeast of the Sonora River, along the Bavispe River towards Fronteras in the north)
- Bedonkohe, Bidánku or Bidankande (Bi-dan-ku – 'In Front of the End People', Bi-da-a-naka-enda or Bedonkohe Ndendahe – 'Standing in front of the enemy', lived in West New Mexico between the San Francisco River in the West and the Gila River to the southeast, lived in the Tularosa Mountains and in their stronghold, the Mogollon Mountains, therefore often called Mogollon Apaches, were also known – together with other Apache local groups living along the Gila River and in the Gila Mountains – as Gileños / Gila Apaches, Northeastern Chiricahua – Geronimo, a prominent leader and medicine man (but not a chief) belonged to this band)
  - local group (today no longer known by name) (lived in the Mogollon Mountains)
  - local group (today no longer known by name) (lived also in the Mogollon Mountains)
  - local group (today no longer known by name) (lived in the Tularosa Mountains)
- Chihenne, Chihende or Tchihende (also known as Chi-he-nde, Tci-he-nde, Chíhéne, Chííhénee’, Chiende – 'Red Painted People', their autonym could relate to the mineral red coloration of the copper-containing tribal area, often called Copper Mine, Ojo Caliente / Warm Springs, Mimbreños / Mimbres and Gileños / Gila Apaches, improperly Eastern Chiricahua)
  - Warm Springs Apache (The vicinity of a southern New Mexico hot spring known as Ojo Caliente (Spanish for Hot Spring) was their favourite retreat and was known to the Apache as Tih-go-tel – ′four broad plains′)
    - northern Warm Springs local group (lived in the northeast of the Bedonkohe in the Datil, Magdalena and Socorro Mountains, the Plains of San Agustin, and from today's Quemado east toward the Rio Grande, northern local group – headed by Victorio)
    - southern Warm Springs local group (Warm Springs proper, settled around a warm spring known as Ojo Caliente near present-day Monticello, New Mexico along the Cañada Alamosa, between the Cuchillo Negro Creek and the Animas Creek, controlled the San Mateo as well as the Black Range (Dził Diłhił) west of the Rio Grande to the Rio Gila, used the warm springs in the vicinity of Truth or Consequences – hence called Warm Springs or Ojo Caliente Apaches, southern local group – headed by Cuchillo Negro)
  - Gileños / Gila Apache (often used as a collective name for different Apache groups living along the Gila River; sometimes for all Chiricahua local groups and sometimes for the Aravaipa / Arivaipa Apache and Pinaleño / Pinal Apache of the Western Apache)
    - Ne-be-ke-yen-de local group (′Country of People′ or ′Earth They Own It People′, presumably a mixed Chihenne-Bedonkohe local group, lived southwest of the Gila River, centered around the Santa Lucia Springs in the Little Burro and Big Burro Mountains, controlled the Pinos Altos Mountains, Pyramid Mountains and the vicinity of Santa Rita del Cobre along the Mimbres River in the east, then called Gileños / Gila Apaches, after discovering profitable copper mines at Santa Rita del Cobre they were called Copper Mine Apaches, western local group – headed by Mangas Coloradas, an Bedonkohe by birth, and later by Loco)
    - Mimbreño / Mimbres local group (lived in southeast-central New Mexico, between the Mimbres River and the Rio Grande up in the Mimbres Mountains and the Cook's Range, hence called Mimbreño / Mimbres Apaches, eastern local group; often the name Mimbreños is used to identify the whole Chihenne people, sometimes it is just thought of simply as an aggregation of some families belonging to the Chihenne people around the Mimbres Agency established by temporary Indian agent James M. Smith in 1853)
    - local group (today no longer known by name) (lived in southern New Mexico in the Pyramid Mountains and Florida Mountains (called by the Chihenne Dzilnokone – Long Hanging Mountain) moved to the Rio Grande in the east and south to the Mexican border, southern group)
- Nednhi, Nde’ndai or Ndendahe (also known as Ndéndai, Nde-nda-i, Nédnaa’í, Ndé’indaaí, Ndé’indaande, Ndaandénde – 'Enemy People', 'People who make trouble', the Mexicans adopted it as Bronco Apaches – ′Wild, Untamed Apaches′, lived in Sierra Madre Occidental and deserts of NW Chihuahua, NO Sonora and SE Arizona, therefore often called Sierre Madre Apaches, Southern Chiricahua)
  - Nednhi / Ndendahe Apache (they were subdivided in three local groups)
    - Janeros local group (also known as real Nednhi, lived in NW Chihuahua and NE Sonora, south into the Sierra San Luis, Sierra del Tigre, Sierra de Carcay, Sierra de Boca Grande, west beyond the Aros River to Bavispe, east along the Janos River and Casas Grandes River toward the Lake Guzmán in the northern part of the Guzmán Basin, because they traded at the presidio of Janos they were called Janeros Apache, because they preferred living in the nearly inaccessible Sierra Madre Occidental, their autonym for themselves was Dzilthdaklizhénde or Dził Dklishende – ′Blue Mountain People, i.e. People of the Sierra Madre′, northern local group – headed by Juh)
    - Tu-ntsa-nde local group (′Big Water People, i.e. People along the Aros River′, their stronghold called Guaynopa was in the bend of the Papigochic River (Aros River) east of the border of Sonora in the vicinity of a mountain, which called the Apache Dzil-da-na-tal – ′Mountain Holding Head Up And Peering Out′, smallest local group)
    - Haiahende local group (′People of the Rising Sun, i.e. People of the East′, lived in the Peloncillo Mountains, Animas Mountains and Florida Mountains in SE Arizona and in New Mexico Bootheel and south into the deserts and mountains of NE of Sonora and the Mexican Plateau in NW Chihuahua, eastern local group)
    - Hakaye local group (were part of Sierra Madre Mountains of Sonora Mexico)
  - Carrizaleños local group (known by other Chiricahua as Gol-ga-he-ne – ′Open Place People′ or Gul-ga-ki – ′Prairie Dog People′, lived exclusively in Chihuahua, between the presidios of Janos in the west and Carrizal and Lake Santa Maria in the east, south toward Corralitos, Casas Grandes and Agua Nuevas 60 miles (97 km) north of Chihuahua, controlled the southern part of the Guzmán Basin, and the mountains along the Casas Grandes, Santa Maria and Carmen River, likely called Tsebekinéndé – 'Stone House People' or 'Rock House People', southeastern group)
  - Pinaleños / Pinery local group (lived south of Bavispe, between the Bavispe River and Aros River in NE Sonora and NW Chihuahua, controlled the Sierra Huachinera, Sierra de los Alisos and Sierra Nacori Chico, the mountains had a large stock of Apache Pine forest – hence they were called Pinaleños / Pinery Apaches, southwestern local group).

The Chokonen, Chihenne, Nednhi, and Bedonkohe had probably up to three other groups, named respectively after their leaders or homelands. By the end of the 19th century, surviving Apache no longer identified these groups. They may have been wiped out (like the Pinaleño-Nednhi) or had joined more powerful groups. For instance, the remnant of the Carrizaleño-Nedhni camped together with their northern kin, the Janero-Nednhi.

The Carrizaleňo-Nednhi shared overlapping territory in the surroundings of Casas Grandes and Aguas Nuevas with the Tsebekinéndé, a southern Mescalero band (which was often called Aguas Nuevas by the Spanish). The Spanish referred to the Apache band by the same name of Tsebekinéndé. These two different Apache bands were often confused with each other. (Similar confusion arose over distinguishing the Janeros-Nednhi of the Chiricahua (Dzilthdaklizhéndé) and the Dzithinahndé of the Mescalero.

== Notable Chiricahua Apache people ==
For people after the 19th century, see the pages of specific tribes: Fort Sill Apache Tribe, Mescalero Apache Tribe of the Mescalero Reservation, and San Carlos Apache Tribe.

- Geronimo (1829–1909), warrior, medicine man of the Bedonkohe Ndendahe band
- Mildred Cleghorn (Fort Sill Apache Tribe), served as first tribal chairperson of the Fort Sill Apache Tribe, elected in 1976
- Chato, also Bidayajislnl or Pedes-klinje (1854–1934), warrior, scout
- Chihuahua, also Chewawa, Kla-esh, Tłá’í’ez (ca. 1825–1901)
- Cochise, chief of the Chihuicahui local group of the Tsokanende people
- Baishan, Cuchillo Negro, (ca. 1796–1857) war chief of the southern Warm Springs local group of the Tchihende people and principal chief of them after his own father's (Fuerte / Soldado Fiero) death
- Dahteste (Tahdeste), woman warrior and Lozen's companion; sister of Ilth-goz-ay, the wife of Chihuahua,
- Delgadito, (ca. 1810–1864), principal chief of the Copper Mine local group of the Tchihende people
- Gouyen, (ca. 1857–1903), woman from the Warm Springs group of Tchihende people
- Juh, (ca. 1825–1883), medicine man and chief of the Janero local group of Nednhi band
- Lozen, "Dextrous Horse Thief" (ca. 1840–1890), woman warrior and prophet of the Tchihende people
- Mangas Coloradas, (ca. 1793–1863) war chief of the Copper Mines local group of the Tchihende people and principal chief after Juan José Compà's death
- Massai, also Mah–sii (ca. 1847–1906/1911), warrior of the Mimbres Tchihende band
- Naiche (ca. 1857–1919), second son of Cochise, was the final hereditary chief of the Chihuicahui local group of the Tsokanende people
- Nana, (ca. 1805/1810?–1896), war chief of the Warm Springs Tchihende people
- Tahzay (ca. 1843–1876), son of Cochise and his successor as chief of the Chihuicahui local group of Tsokanende people
- Tso-ay, also Panayotishn, Pe-nel-tishn, "Peaches," Scout for General Crook
- Ulzana (ca. 1821–1909), war chief Chihuahua of the Chokonen local group of Tsokanende people
- Victorio, also Bidu-ya, Beduiat (He who checks his horse) (ca. 1825–1880), chief of the Warm Springs Tchihende (Mimbreño) people

== See also ==
- Mescalero-Chiricahua language
- Southern Athabaskan languages

== Cited works ==
- Debo, Angie. (1976) Geronimo: The Man, His Time, His Place, Norman: University of Oklahoma Press. ISBN 0-8061-1828-8.
- Roberts, David. (1993) Once They Moved Like the Wind, New York: Simon & Schuster. ISBN 0-671-702211
- Thrapp, Dan L. (1988) The Conquest of Apacheria, Norman: University of Oklahoma Press. ISBN 0-8061-1286-7
