= Tso-ay =

Apache warrior (c. 1853–1933)

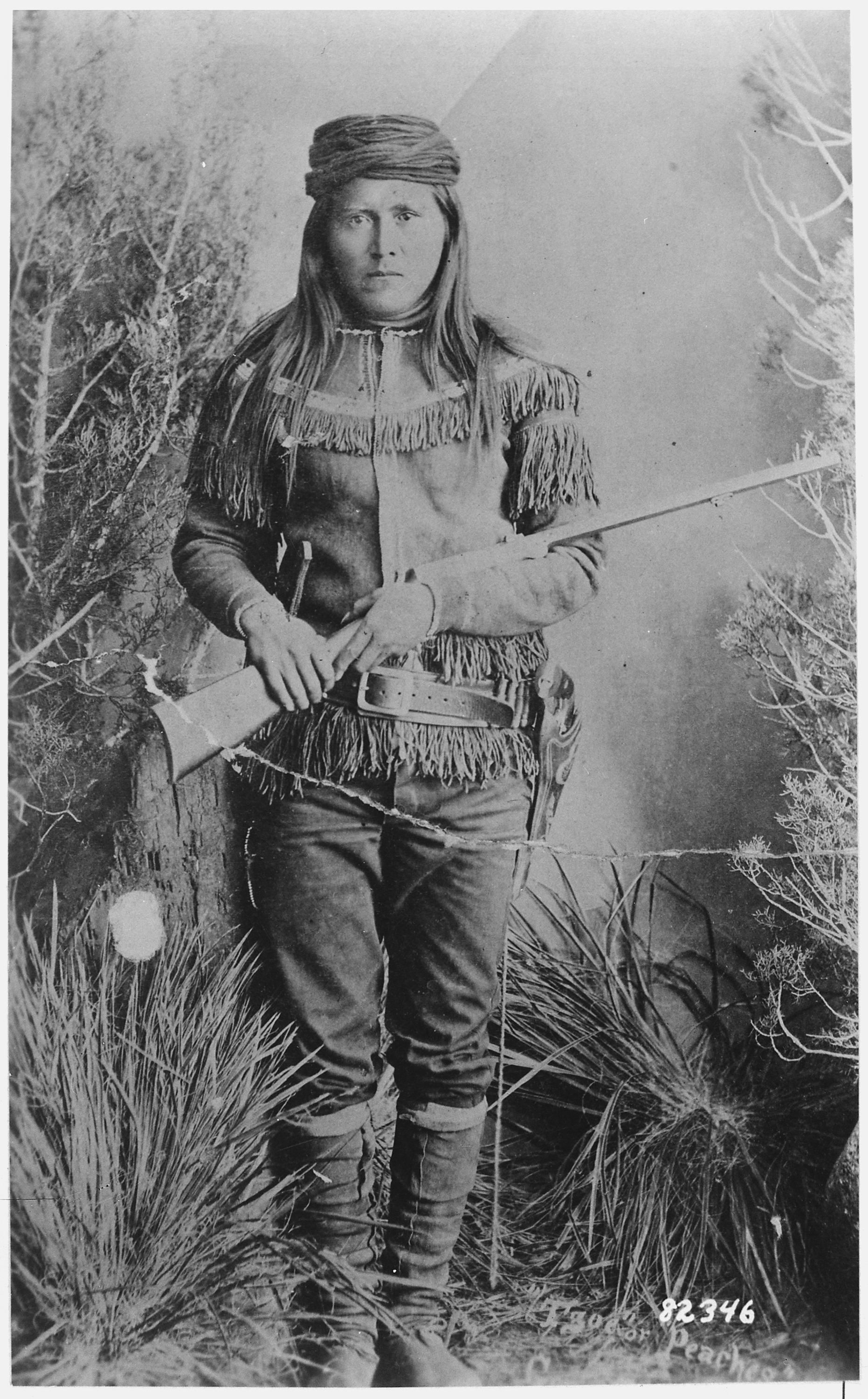
- Tso-ay in 1885
- Born: c. 1853; Chiricahua country
- Died: December 16, 1933; Cibecue, Arizona
- Military career
- Allegiance: Chiricahua Apache Indians
- Service years: 1880–1886
- Rank: Scout
- Nickname: Peaches
- Conflicts: Apache Wars
- Other work: rancher

Tso-ay, also known as Panayotishn or Pe-nel-tishn, today widely known by his nickname as "Peaches", (c. 1853 – December 16, 1933) was a Chiricahua, Western Apache warrior, who also served as a scout for General George Crook during the Apache Wars. Tso-ay was wounded while fighting alongside Geronimo and Chihuahua against Mexican troops, who had ambushed them after the Apache had crossed the border while being pursued by American troops.

== Early life ==
Before serving as a scout for the army, Tso-ay rode with Chatto in a raid. The raid consisted of twenty six men and they traveled 400 miles. They covered between seventy five and one hundred miles a day and killed twenty six settlers. During the raid, Tso-ay, deciding he had had enough of raiding, left the war party to return to the San Carlos Apache Indian Reservation. Following this Tso-ay was captured by Lieutenant Britton Davis who was accompanied by thirty scouts and some Tonto Apache. Davis sent a telegram to Crook notifying him of the capture of Tso-ay, and Crook requested that Davis enlist Tso-ay as a scout, if Tso-ay was willing. Tso-ay joined and was sent to meet with Crook at Willcox, where he was given the nickname "Peaches", because of his fair complexion and the smoothness of his skin. Tso-ay led Crook and his men into the upper Rio Bavispe and brought them to the camps of Chato and Benito.

Tso-Ay was one of Crook's primary scouts and played a major role in leading the army into several of the strongholds the Apache had in Mexico. Although Tso-ay had served loyally he was exiled with Geronimo to Florida following the Apache wars.

He retired in Cibecue and shortly before his death in 1933 he converted to Christianity.

== Legacy ==
Tso-Ay has been mentioned in Valdez is Coming, a western novel by Elmore Leonard.

== Bibliography ==
- Blackman Nunis, Doyce (1992). The life of Tom Horn revisited. Golden West Books. ISBN 978-0870951077.
- Faulk, Odie B. (1993). The Geronimo Campaign. Oxford University Press. ISBN 978-0195083514.
- Hayes, Alden C. (2000). A Portal to Paradise. University of Arizona Press. ISBN 978-0816521449.
- Jastrzembski, Joseph C. (2007). Paul C. Rosier (ed.). The Apache Wars: The Final Resistance. Chelsea House. ISBN 978-0791093436.
- Langellier, John P. (2011). Southern Arizona Military Outposts. Arcadia. ISBN 978-0738579924.
- Leonard, Elmore (2012). Valdez Is Coming. William Morrow & Company. ISBN 978-0062227850.
- Radbourne, Allan (1 January 2005). Mickey Free: Apache Captive, Interpreter, and Indian Scout. Arizona Historical Society. ISBN 978-0-910037-46-4.
- Thrapp, Dan L. (1979). The Conquest of Apacheria. University of Oklahoma Press. ISBN 978-0806112862.
- Worcester, Donald E. (1979). The Apaches: Eagles of the Southwest. University of Oklahoma Press. ISBN 978-0806114958.
