= Taza, Son of Cochise =

1954 film by Douglas Sirk

- Film poster by Reynold Brown
- Directed by: Douglas Sirk
- Screenplay by: George Zuckerman
- Story by: Gerald Drayson Adams (story and adaptation)
- Produced by: Ross Hunter
- Starring: Rock Hudson; Barbara Rush
- Cinematography: Russell Metty
- Edited by: Milton Carruth
- Music by: Frank Skinner
- Color process: Technicolor
- Production company: Universal International Pictures
- Distributed by: Universal Pictures
- Release date: February 18, 1954
- Running time: 79 minutes
- Country: United States
- Language: English
- Box office: $1.1 million

Taza, Son of Cochise is a 1954 American Western film directed by Douglas Sirk and starring Rock Hudson and Barbara Rush. The film was shot in 3D, and is one of just two films confirmed to have been released in the Pola-Lite 3D System using one projector.

== Plot ==
Three years after the end of the Apache Wars, peacemaking chief Cochise dies. His elder son Taza (Rock Hudson) shares his ideas, but (in this fictional narrative) brother Naiche (Bart Roberts) yearns for war...and for Taza's betrothed, Oona (Barbara Rush). Naiche loses no time in starting trouble which, thanks to a bigoted cavalry officer, ends with the proud Chiricahua Apaches on a reservation, where they are soon joined by the captured renegade Geronimo, who is all it takes to start a war.

== Cast ==
- Rock Hudson as Taza
- Barbara Rush as Oona
- Gregg Palmer as Captain Burnett
- Bart Roberts as Naiche
- Morris Ankrum as Grey Eagle
- Gene Iglesias as Chato
- Richard H. Cutting as Cy Hegan
- Ian MacDonald as Geronimo
- Robert Burton as General Crook
- Joe Sawyer as Sgt. Hamma
- Lance Fuller as Lt. Willis
- Bradford Jackson as Lt. Richards (as Brad Jackson)
- James Van Horn as Skinya
- Charles Horvath as Kocha
- Robert F. Hoy as Lobo (as Robert Hoy)
- Barbara Burck as Mary
- Dan White as Tiswin Charlie
- Jeff Chandler as Cochise (uncredited)
- Russell Johnson as Narrator (uncredited)

== Production ==
It was the third time Jeff Chandler played Cochise, following Broken Arrow and The Battle at Apache Pass. Parts of the film were shot in Castle Valley, Professor Valley, Sand Flats, Devil's Garden, and Arches National Park in Utah.

== Acknowledgment in end credits ==
"We gratefully acknowledge the assistance of the National Park Service of the United States Department of the Interior whose splendid cooperation made possible the photography of scenes at Arches National Monument Park".

== Home media ==
- Universal Home Video, in conjunction with Turner Classic Movies, released a print-on-demand Region 1 DVD of Taza, Son of Cochise in 2014.
- KL Studio Classics released a new 2K 3D restoration of the title on Region A Blu-ray in May 2020 in combined 3D and 2D formats.
