= Orizoba Spence =

US Army soldier and Medal of Honor recipient (1847–1876)

Orizoba O. Spence
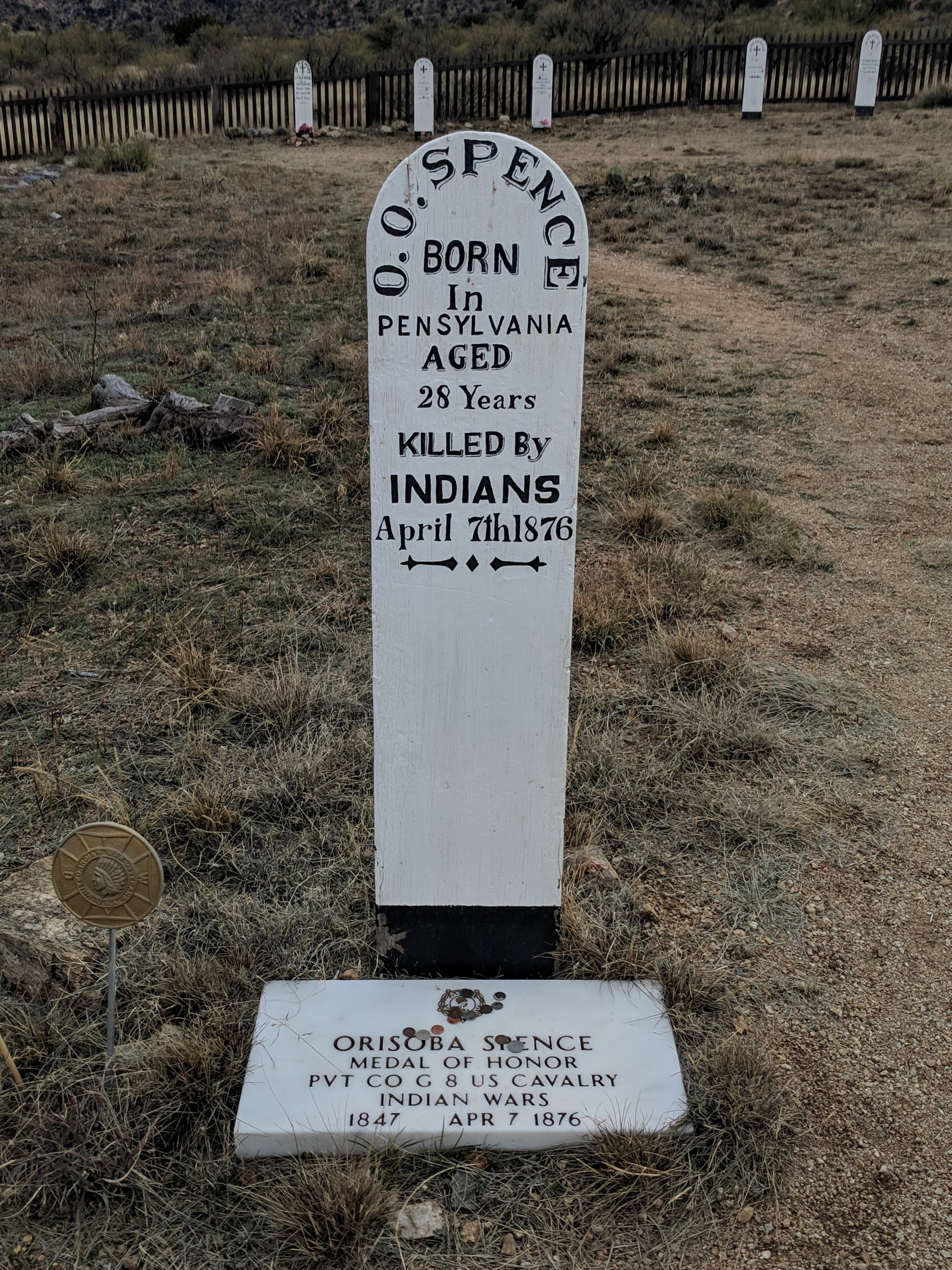
- Headboard of O. O. Spence
- Born: 1847; Tionesta, Pennsylvania
- Died: April 7, 1876 (aged 28–29); Sulphur Springs, Arizona Territory
- Burial place: Fort Bowie Post Cemetery
- Military career
- Allegiance: United States of America
- Branch: United States Army
- Rank: Sergeant
- Units: Company G, 8th Cavalry Regiment
- Conflicts: Indian Wars
- Awards: Medal of Honor

Orizoba O. Spence (1847 – April 7, 1876), alternatively spelled Orisoba, was a sergeant in the United States Army who received the Medal of Honor for gallantry in action during the Indian Wars.

== Biography ==
Spence was born in 1847 in Tionesta, Pennsylvania, and joined the Army in 1868. He was stationed at Fort Bowie in the Arizona Territory with Company G of the 8th Cavalry Regiment. On October 20, 1869, Spence earned a Medal of Honor for gallantry after a battle against a band of Apaches led by Cochise.

Spence was discharged from the army as a sergeant at Fort Selden, New Mexico in 1873. He married in 1874 and briefly resided in Grant County, New Mexico. He went on to work as a cook at the overland mail stage station at Sulphur Springs in the Arizona Territory.

On April 7, 1876, the station was raided by a band of Apaches led by Pionsenay after an argument over whiskey sales. Pionsenay shot and killed Spence and Nicholas Rogers, the station operator. The two were initially buried at the station, however, the bodies were later exhumed for interment at Fort Bowie.

== Medal of Honor citation ==
Rank and organization: Private, Company G, 8th Cavalry Regiment. Place and date: At Chiricahua Mountains, Ariz., October 20, 1869. Entered service at: Tionesta, Pa. Birth: Forest County, Pa. Date of issue: February 14, 1870.

Citation:

Gallantry in action.

== See also ==
- List of Medal of Honor recipients for the Indian Wars
