= Janos, Chihuahua =

Town in the Mexican state of Chihuahua

Janos
- Town
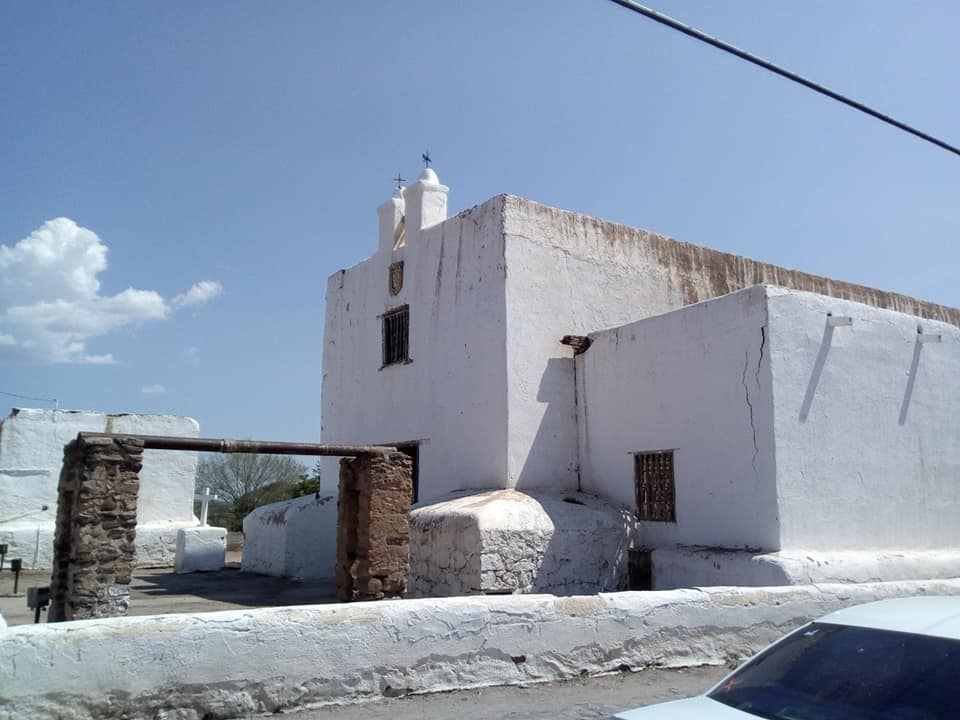
- Franciscan mission in Janos, established in 1640
- Interactive map of Janos
- Location in Mexico Janos (Chihuahua)
- Coordinates: 30°53′16″N 108°11′24″W
- Elevation: 1,357 m (4,452 ft)

Population (2010)
  - Total: 2,738

Janos is a town located in the northern Mexican state of Chihuahua. It serves as the municipal seat of government for the surrounding Janos Municipality of the same name. As of 2010, the town of Janos had a population of 2,738. Janos was possibly the site of a Franciscan mission established about 1640 and destroyed by Indian attack in the 1680s. The Spanish established a fort in Janos in 1686 which became a key element in the Spanish attempt to suppress raids and attacks by the Apache people. Several hundred Apaches often lived near the presidio during the late 18th and early 19th centuries.

== History ==
In his Memorial of 1630 Franciscan missionary Alonso de Benavides mentions the Janos ("Hanos") and Suma among the "ferocious tribes" living along the caravan route between Spanish settlements in Mexico and New Mexico. In 1640, a mission called Nuestra Señora de la Soledad de los Janos was established to Christianize these and other tribes of Native Americans. The initial location of the mission is in doubt. It was possibly near the future town of Janos, or possibly near El Paso, Texas. In the 1680s the mission was destroyed by an uprising of the Suma and Janos and other tribes. Another, probably related people, the Jocomes also became prominent near Janos.

In 1686 the Spanish governor ordered Captain Juan Fernández de la Fuente to send troops to Janos to establish a presidio (fortress). It was named Presidio de San Felipe y Santiago de Janos and in 1717 the Franciscan mission was re-established among the Janos and Jocomes people. In 1692, however, a new people, the Apache, were recorded for the first time within the borders of Mexico, having immigrated from further north. The Suma, Janos, and Jocomes gradually disappeared from Spanish records, probably absorbed by the Apache or, in the case of some of the Suma, becoming part of the detribalized Native American population of El Paso, Texas.

=== Apaches ===
Janos was one of 18 presidios mostly located near the 21st century border of Mexico and the United States that the Spanish created to defend the Mexican settlements from the attacks and raids of Apaches and later Comanches. The grievances of the Apaches included the frequent slave raids of the Spaniards and their Native American allies which resulted in the capture and enslavement of many Apaches and other peoples. Janos was arguably the most important of the presidios with an eventual complement of 144 soldiers, plus auxiliaries drawn from Native Americans and civilians living nearby. Little information survives about the Janos presidio before 1750, although in 1737 a Spanish writer mentioned the devastation wrought by Apache raids.

Decades of Apache raids and Spanish retaliations culminated in the 1770s. In Nueva Vizcaya (21st century Chihuahua and Durango states) between 1771 and 1776, 1,674 deaths of Spanish subjects were recorded, 154 were captured, 100 ranches were abandoned, and 68,000 head of livestock were stolen. Several large Spanish expeditions led by Hugo Oconór from Janos and other presidios were launched and inflicted substantial deaths among Apaches.

Despite the problems with the Apaches, the town of Janos was founded about 1778 and the civilian population began to grow slowly. In 1807 a chapel, Nuestra Señora del Pilar was completed. The Spanish began to implement pacification programs. In 1790, Apaches were invited to settle in Janos in exchange for gifts of food and other supplies. In 1793, 368 Apaches were counted at Janos as "pacified." That number would fluctuate, but generally remain in the hundreds until near the end of the pacification program in 1831. In exchanges for their pledges of peace each Apache man received weekly two almudes (roughly 15 liters) of corn or wheat, a packet of cigarettes, a cake of brown sugar, salt, and (when available) 1/32nd of a butchered steer. Chiefs received more sugar and cigarettes, and women and children received a reduced amount of food. The Apaches were permitted to forage for additional food. The Apaches also received clothing and some additional items, as needed. The Spanish gave horses and other gifts to favored Apache leaders. In return the Apaches were to refrain from warfare, learn agriculture, and raise crops. They were expected to join and guide Spanish expeditions against warring Apaches—although the years 1790 to 1820 were years of relative peace. A few Apaches became Christians and a few Apache women married Spanish men.

Foreign encroachments on Apache lands increased after Mexico became independent from Spain in 1821 and the practice of giving rations to pacified Apaches ended in 1831. Nearly all the Apache left the presidios, including Janos, and resumed their traditional lives, including raiding. In 1858, the mother, wife, and three children of Apache leader Geronimo were among those killed near Janos in a massacre by a Mexican military force from Sonora. Geronimo at the time of the massacre was in Janos trading with local merchants.

== Geography ==
=== Climate ===
Janos has a semi-arid climate (Köppen climate classification BSk). In the Trewartha climate classification system Janos has a BSbk climate (semi-arid steppe with warm summers and cool winters). Winters are sunny with a January average of 7.1 °C (44.8 °F), but temperatures regularly fall below freezing. The town can have 2 or 3 snowfalls per year. June is the warmest month with an average of 22.3 °C (72.1 °F). Most of the precipitation falls from July to October during the monsoon season. The highest recorded temperature was 45.0 °C (113.0 °F) on August 21, 1979 and the lowest recorded temperature was −13 °C (8.6 °F) on December 9, 1978.

Climate data for Janos, Chihuahua, elevation 1,357 metres (4,452 ft)
Month	Jan	Feb	Mar	Apr	May	Jun	Jul	Aug	Sep	Oct	Nov	Dec	Year
Record high °C (°F)	26.0 (78.8)	29.0 (84.2)	31.0 (87.8)	36.0 (96.8)	40.0 (104.0)	42.0 (107.6)	40.0 (104.0)	45.0 (113.0)	40.0 (104.0)	36.5 (97.7)	30.0 (86.0)	26.0 (78.8)	45.0 (113.0)
Mean daily maximum °C (°F)	14.2 (57.6)	16.7 (62.1)	19.5 (67.1)	23.1 (73.6)	27.3 (81.1)	31.5 (88.7)	30.1 (86.2)	30.1 (86.2)	27.1 (80.8)	22.7 (72.9)	18.0 (64.4)	14.6 (58.3)	22.9 (73.2)
Daily mean °C (°F)	7.1 (44.8)	8.8 (47.8)	11.1 (52.0)	14.3 (57.7)	18.2 (64.8)	22.3 (72.1)	22.3 (72.1)	22.1 (71.8)	19.4 (66.9)	14.7 (58.5)	10.1 (50.2)	7.4 (45.3)	14.8 (58.6)
Mean daily minimum °C (°F)	−0.1 (31.8)	0.9 (33.6)	2.8 (37.0)	5.4 (41.7)	9.0 (48.2)	13.2 (55.8)	14.5 (58.1)	14.1 (57.4)	11.6 (52.9)	6.6 (43.9)	2.1 (35.8)	0.2 (32.4)	6.7 (44.1)
Record low °C (°F)	−10.0 (14.0)	−7.5 (18.5)	−7.0 (19.4)	−11.5 (11.3)	−7.0 (19.4)	2.0 (35.6)	2.0 (35.6)	2.0 (35.6)	1.0 (33.8)	−4.0 (24.8)	−12.0 (10.4)	−13.0 (8.6)	−13.0 (8.6)
Average precipitation mm (inches)	15.3 (0.60)	11.6 (0.46)	11.0 (0.43)	7.1 (0.28)	5.8 (0.23)	16.7 (0.66)	73.8 (2.91)	58.6 (2.31)	46.3 (1.82)	29.5 (1.16)	15.5 (0.61)	21.5 (0.85)	312.7 (12.31)
Average precipitation days (≥ 0.1 mm)	3.0	2.0	2.0	1.2	1.0	1.8	9.1	7.2	5.2	3.3	2.1	3.4	41.3
Average snowy days	0.60	0.50	0.30	0.05	0	0	0	0	0	0	0.31	0.57	2.33
Source 1: Servicio Meteorológico Nacional
Source 2: Colegio de Postgraduados (snowy days)
