= Taza (Chiricahua leader) =

Apache chief (c.1843–1876)

Tah-ze
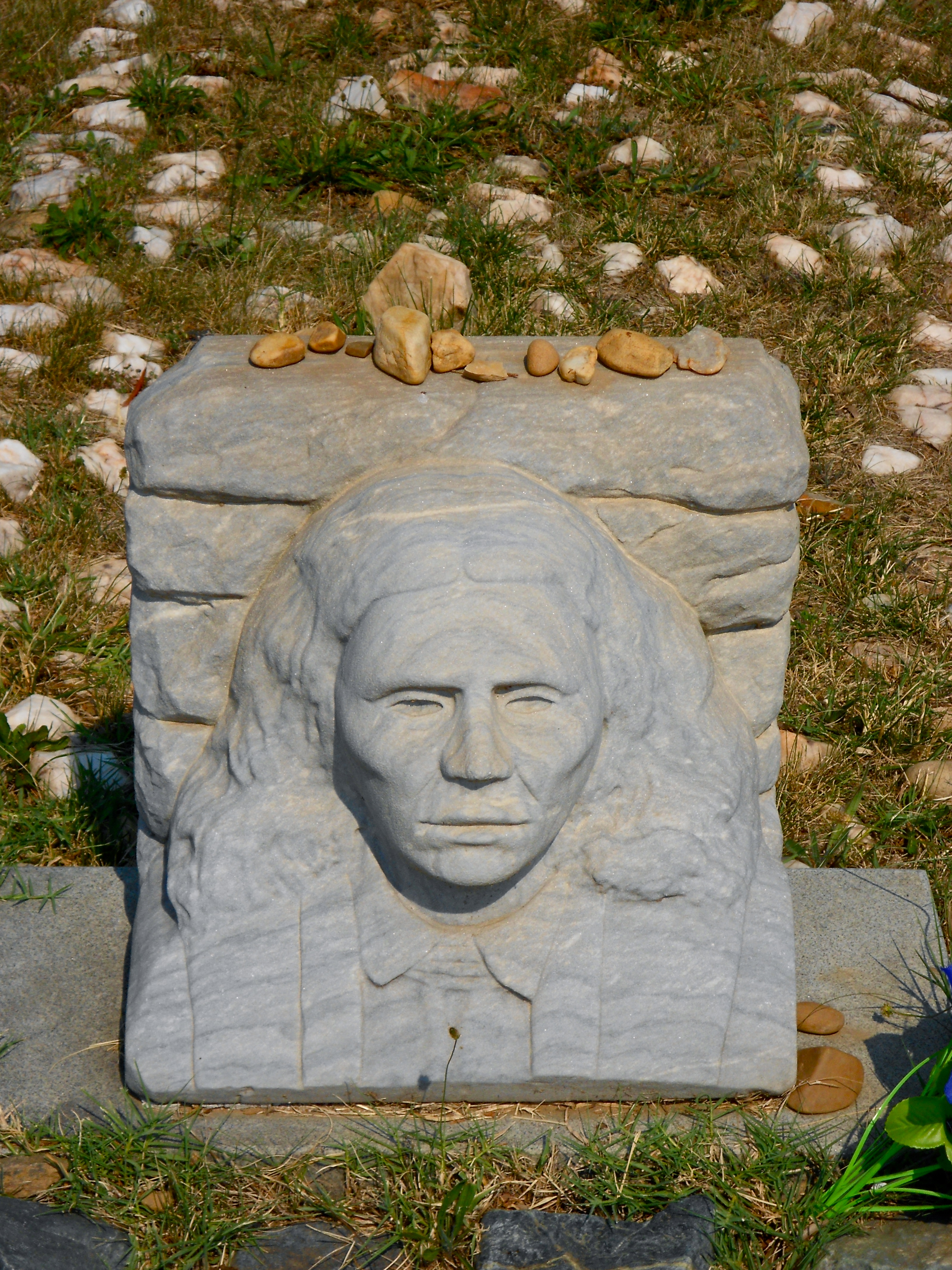
- Grave of Taza
- Born: c. birth year – c. 1843; Chiricahua country
- Died: September 26, 1876; Washington D.C.
- Burial place: Congressional Cemetery, Washington D.C.
- Relatives: Cochise (father)
- Military career
- Allegiance: Chiricahua Apache Indians
- Service years: 1860–1876
- Rank: Chief or Leader of Chiricahua Apaches
- Conflicts: Apache Wars

Taza (also Tazi; Tazhe; Tah-ze; Tahzi; Tahzay; Tazhay) (c. 1843 – 26 September 1876) was the son of Cochise, leader of the Chihuicahui local group of the Chokonen and principal chief of the Chokonen band of the Chiricahua Apache. His mother Dos-teh-seh (“Something-at-the-campfire-already-cooked”), was the daughter of Mangas Coloradas, leader of the Copper Mines and last leader of the Mimbreños local groups of the Chihenne band and principal chief of the Chihenne band of the Chiricahua Apache.

== Chief Taza ==
Taza was the older full brother of Naiche (Natchez). Taza succeeded his father Cochise as chief of the Chiricahuas when the latter died in 1874, two years after the Chiricahua Reservation was established by General Howard.

John Clum, an Indian agent for the San Carlos Apache Indian Reservation, was sent to pursue Taza and the rest of the Chiricahua in May 1876. He had the goal of relocating the band to his reservation. Naiche and Taza argued with the brothers Skinya and Pionsenay about how to proceed. Skinya and Pionsenay wanted to continue the war, while Naiche and Taza sought to surrender. Skinya was killed when Naiche shot him in the head. Pionsenay was shot in the shoulder by Taza, critically wounding him. Pionsenay fled with those loyal to him and refused to follow the sons of Cochise to the reservation.

In 1876 the tribe was removed from the Chiricahua reservation to San Carlos, and in September of the same year Taza was one of a delegation of Apaches taken to Washington D.C. for a visit. He fell ill in Washington and died there of pneumonia on September 26, 1876, after only about two years as chief.

Taza is buried in Congressional Cemetery in Washington D.C. Taza's mother Dos-teh-seh, his brother Naiche, and his half-sisters Dash-den-zhoos and Naithlotonz (Naiche-dos), lived through the prisoner-of-war period and went to Mescalero.

It is unknown if a portrait of Taza was ever made; an alleged "photograph" of Taza was actually made of a Native American named George Noche in 1886.

== Legacy ==
The 1954 film Taza, Son of Cochise was directed by Douglas Sirk and stars Rock Hudson as Taza.
