= Apachería =

Geographical region inhabited by the Apache people

- People: Apache
- Language: Apache
- Country: Apachería

Apachería was the term used to designate the region of the various Apache countries. The earliest written records have it as a region extending from north of the Arkansas River into what are now the northern states of Mexico and from Central Texas through New Mexico to Central Arizona.

Most notable were the Apaches of the Great Plains in the eastern area of Apachería, located:

- south of the Arkansas River in Kansas and eastern Colorado
- in Eastern New Mexico
- in the Llano Estacado and Central Great Plains of western Oklahoma and Texas, east of the Pecos River and north of the Edwards Plateau.

== Bibliography ==
- Cozzens, Peter (2001). Eyewitnesses to the Indian wars : 1865 - 1890. 1. The struggle for Apacheria. Mechanicsburg, Pennsylvania: Stackpole Books. pp. 458–480. ISBN 978-0-8117-0572-1.
- Thrapp, Dan L. (1979) The Conquest of Apacheria. Norman, Oklahoma: University of Oklahoma Press.

== See also ==
- Comanchería (Note: In the early 18th century, the Comanche expanded out of present-day Wyoming into the lands that then became known as Comanchería displacing other tribes. The Apache were forced to move southward and westward as a result.)
- Huronia (region) (Wendake)
- Lenapehoking
- Yazoo lands
