= Cochise =

Apache tribe chief (c. 1805–1874)

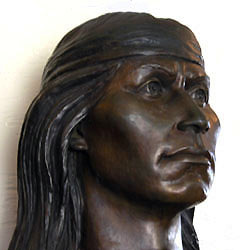
- Bronze bust of imagined likeness of Cochise by Betty Butts, Fort Bowie National Historic Site, Arizona
- Born: c. 1805; Chiricahua country, under Spanish occupation
- Died: June 8, 1874 (aged 68–69); Cochise Stronghold, Dragoon Mountains, Arizona, U.S.
- Burial place: Dragoon Mountains, Arizona, U.S.
- Military career
- Allegiance: Chiricahua Apache Indians
- Service years: 1861–1872
- Rank: Chief of Chiricahua Apaches
- Conflicts: Apache Wars: Bascom Affair; Battle of Cookes Canyon; Battle of the Florida Mountains; Battle of Pinos Altos; First Battle of Dragoon Springs; Second Battle of Dragoon Springs; Battle of Apache Pass

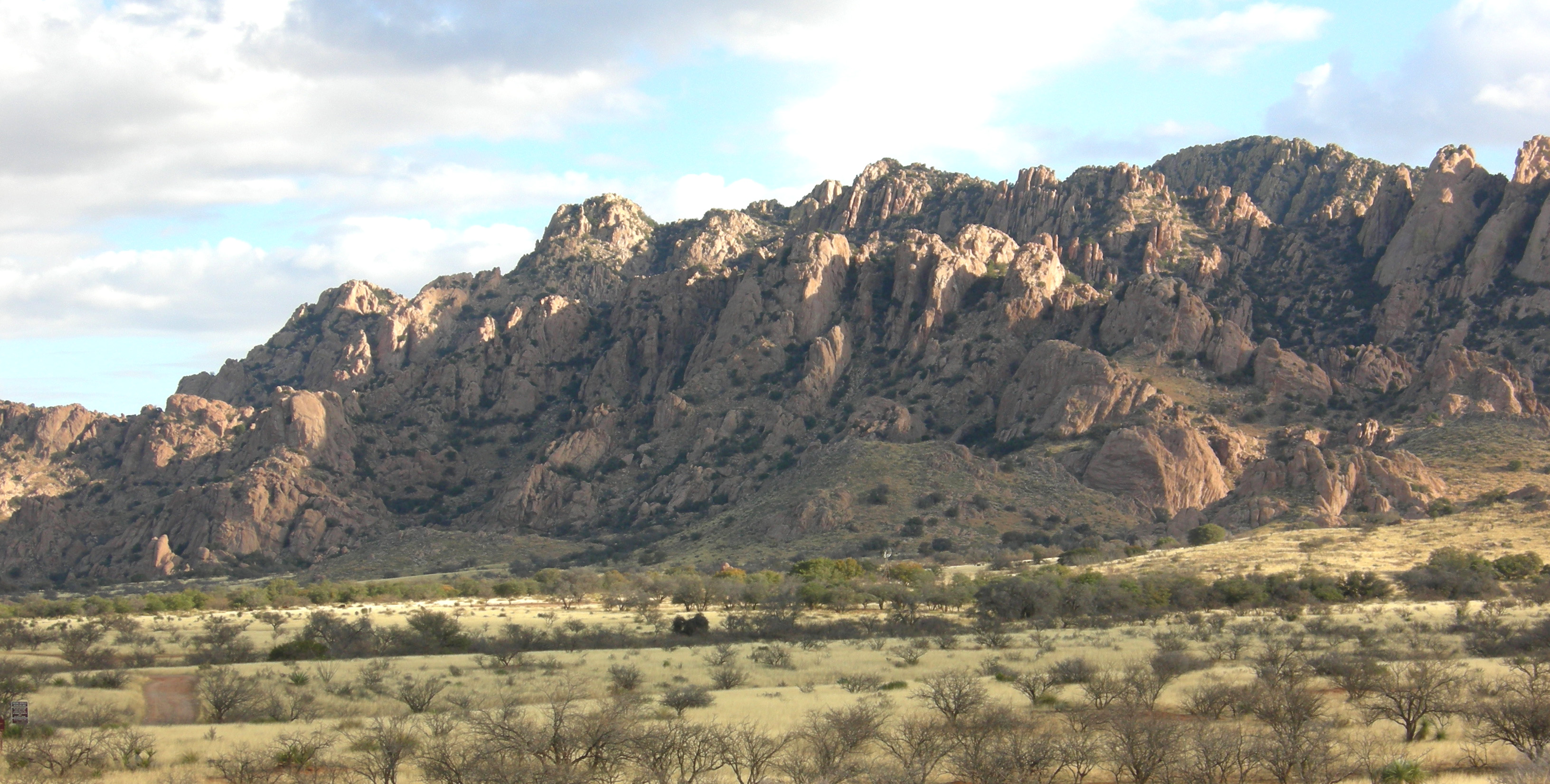
Dragoon Mountains in Southeastern Arizona, where Cochise hid with his warriors

Cochise (/koʊˈtʃiːs/ koh-CHEESS; Apache: Shi-ka-She or A-da-tli-chi, lit. 'having the quality/strength of an oak'; later K'uu-ch'ish or Cheis, lit. 'oak'; c. 1805 – June 8, 1874) was the leader of the Chiricahui local group of the Chokonen and principal nantan of the Chokonen band of the Chiricahua Apache. A key war leader during the Apache Wars, he led an uprising that began in 1861 and persisted until a peace treaty was negotiated in 1872. Cochise County is named after him.

== Biography ==
Cochise (or "Cheis") was one of the most noted Apache leaders (along with Geronimo and Mangas Coloradas) to resist intrusions by Mexicans and Americans during the 19th century. He was described as a large man (for the time), with a muscular frame, classical features and long, black hair, which he wore in traditional Apache style. He was about 6 feet (1.8 m) tall and weighed about 175 pounds (79 kg). In his own language, his name Cheis meant "having the quality or strength of oak."

Cochise and the Chokonen-Chiricahua lived in the area that is now the northern region of Sonora, Mexico; New Mexico and Arizona, which they had settled in sometime before the arrival of the European explorers and colonists. As Spain and later Mexico attempted to gain dominion over the Chiricahua lands, the indigenous groups became increasingly resistant. Cycles of warfare developed, which the Apache mostly won. Eventually, instead of vanquishing the Apache, the Spanish sought to pacify them through dependence upon gifted older firearms and liquor rations issued by the colonial government.

After Mexico gained independence from Spain and took control of this territory, these "Galvez Peace Policy" practices were ended, perhaps from lack of resources (and/or lack of will). The various Chiricahua bands resumed raiding in the 1830s to acquire these goods after the Mexicans stopped their sale to them.

As a result, the Mexican government began a series of military operations to stop the raids, which were fought to a standstill. When Cochise's father was killed in the fighting, Cochise deepened his resolve and the Chiricahua pursued vengeance against the Mexicans.

Cochise was captured at one point in 1848 by Mexican forces, during an Apache raid on Fronteras, Sonora, but he was exchanged for nearly a dozen Mexican prisoners.

=== Border tensions and fighting ===
Beginning with early Spanish colonization around 1801, the Apache suffered tension and strife with European settlers until the greater part of the area was acquired by the United States in 1850 following the Mexican War. For a time, the two peoples managed peaceful relations. In the late 1850s, Cochise may have supplied firewood for the Butterfield Overland Mail stagecoach station at Apache Pass.

The tenuous peace did not last, as American encroachment into Apache territory continued. In 1861, the Bascom affair was a catalyst for armed confrontation. An Apache raiding party had driven away a local rancher's cattle and kidnapped his 12-year-old stepson (Felix Ward, who later became known as Mickey Free). Cochise and his band were mistakenly accused of the incident (which had been carried out by another Apache band, the Coyotero). Army officer Lt. George Bascom invited Cochise to the Army's encampment in the belief that the warrior was responsible for the incident. Cochise maintained his innocence and offered to look into the matter with other Apache groups, but the officer tried to arrest him. Cochise escaped by drawing a knife and slashing his way out of the tent, and was shot at as he fled.

Bascom captured some of Cochise's relatives, who apparently were taken by surprise as Cochise escaped. Cochise eventually also took hostages to use in negotiations to free the hostages. However, the negotiations fell apart, when the arrival of U.S. troop reinforcements led Cochise to believe that the situation was spiraling out of his control. Both sides eventually killed all their remaining hostages. Cochise went on to carry out about 11 years of relentless warfare, reducing much of the Mexican/American settlements in southern Arizona to a burned-out wasteland. Historian Dan Thrapp estimated the total death toll of settlers and Mexican/American travelers as 5,000, but most historians believe it was more likely a few hundred. The mistaken arrest of Cochise by Lt. Bascom is still remembered by the Chiricahua's descendants today, who describe the incident as "Cut the Tent".

Cochise joined his father-in-law Mangas Coloradas (Red Sleeves, Kan-da-zis Tlishishen), the powerful Chihenne-Chiricahua chief, in a long series of retaliatory skirmishes and raids on the white settlements and ranches. The First Battle of Dragoon Springs was one of these engagements. During the raids, many people were killed, but the Apache quite often had the upper hand. The United States was distracted by its own internal conflict of the looming Civil War and had begun to pull military forces out of the area. Additionally, the Apaches were highly adapted to living and fighting in the harsh terrain of the Southwest. Many years passed before the US Army, using tactics conceived by General George Crook and later adopted by General Nelson A. Miles, was able to effectively challenge the Apache warriors on their own lands.

=== Battle of Apache Pass ===
In 1862, Cochise and Mangas Coloradas and around 500 men were routed in the Battle of Apache Pass when a New Mexico-bound force of California volunteers mounted howitzer fire on their positions in the rocks above the pass.

According to scout John C. Cremony and historian Dan L. Thrapp, the howitzer fire sent the previously entrenched Apaches into an immediate retreat. The engagement was one of the rare pitched battles the Apaches fought against the Army, normally employing guerrilla-style hit-and-run tactics.

Capt. Thomas Roberts was persuaded by this conflict to find a route around Apache Pass. Commanding Gen. James Henry Carleton continued unhindered to New Mexico and subsequently took over as military head of the territory.

In January 1863, Gen. Joseph R. West, under orders from Gen. Carleton, captured Mangas Coloradas by luring him into a peaceful parley under a flag of truce. Taken prisoner, Mangas Coloradas was later executed. Outrage over the combination escalated enmity between Cochise and the Apache and the encroaching Americans, with raids against U.S. and Mexican settlements and military positions continuing throughout the 1860s.

=== Capture, escape and retirement ===
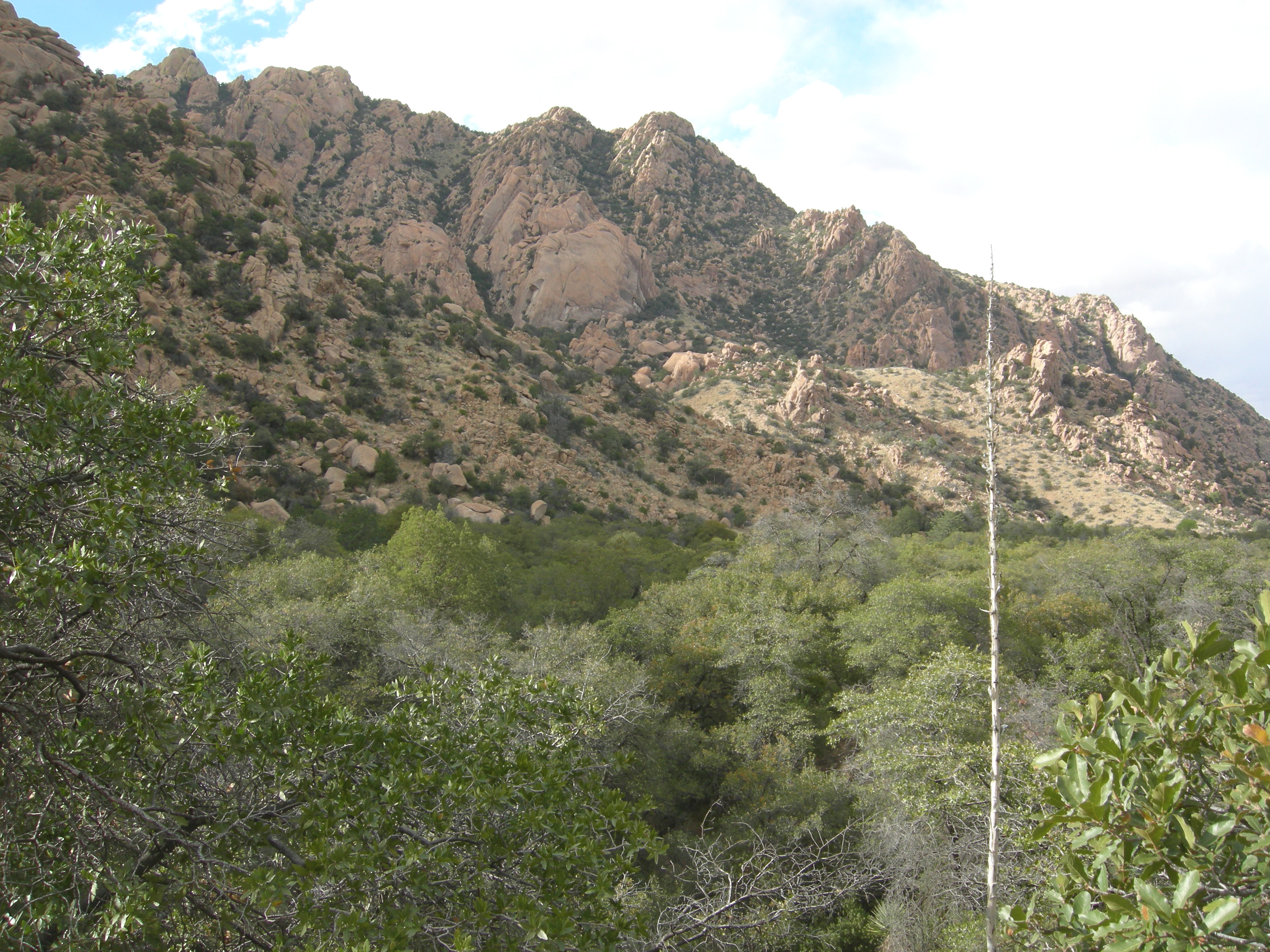
Cochise Stronghold, Dragoon Mountains, southeastern Arizona

Following various skirmishes, Cochise and his men were gradually driven into Arizona's Dragoon Mountains, which they used as cover and a base to continue attacks against white settlements and travelers.

In 1871, General Oliver O. Howard was ordered to find Cochise. In 1872, he, his aide, 1st Lt Joseph A. Sladen and Captain Samuel S. Sumner, traveled to Arizona to negotiate a peace treaty with the Apache leader. Tom Jeffords, Cochise's only white friend, was also present. An agreement was negotiated on October 12, 1872. Based on statements by Sumner and descriptions by Sladen, modern historians such as Robert M. Utley believe that Cochise's Spanish interpreter was Geronimo.

After the peace treaty, Cochise retired to the short-lived Chiricahua Reservation (1872–1876), with his friend Jeffords as agent. He died of natural causes (probably abdominal cancer) in 1874 and was buried in the rocks above one of his favorite camps in Arizona's Dragoon Mountains, now called the Cochise Stronghold. Only his people and Tom Jeffords knew the exact location of his resting place, which they never disclosed.

Many of Cochise's descendants reside at the Mescalero Apache Reservation near Ruidoso, New Mexico and in Oklahoma with the Fort Sill Apache Tribe of Chiricahua Warm Springs Apache.

Whether a likeness of Cochise exists is unknown; a reported portrait is actually that of a 1903 Pueblo of Isleta man named Juan Rey Abeita.

== Family ==
Cochise married Dos-teh-seh (Dos-tes-ey, Doh-teh-seh – "Something-at-the-campfire-already-cooked", b. 1813), the daughter of Mangas Coloradas, who was the leader of the Warm Springs and Mimbreño local groups of the Chihenne band. Their children were Taza (1842–1876) and Naiche (1856–1919).
