= Cañada Alamosa (Apache land) =

Proposed Apache reservation

Canada Alamosa, an Americanized version of the Spanish Cañada Alamosa (pronounced Cănyădă Ălămosă, translated as Glen or Valley of the Cottonwoods), is the historic name of an area which Apache bands regarded as their ancestral home base in the mid-19th century. Prominent among these bands were the Warm Springs band (Chihenne, or Red Paint People). The location was proposed to be an Apache reservation, but this never materialized.

== Geography ==
The area centered on the Canada Alamosa, a high-walled box canyon of about 12 miles long, midway along the course of Alamosa Creek. Because of the canyon, the stream was also referred to as the Canada Alamosa. The Warm Springs band considered the heart of their homeland to be a warm springs, Ojo Caliente, located just at the western entrance to the canyon.

== Cultural history ==
Cañada Alamosa is the term used by historians to refer to the ancestral homeland of the Warm Springs Band (Chihenne, or Red Paint People) of the Chiricahua Apache. (Note: The Apache name for the Warm Spring band, indicating the Red Paint People, has been spelled in different ways. refers to the "Chihende" band of Apaches. The Article by Virginia T. McLemore on the Geology of the area that includes Red Paint Canyon, refers to the Tcihene Apache. However the more common spelling is Chihenne (or sometimes Chihene), and that is used in this article.) Their homeland centered on the Cañada Alamosa area, and they considered a spring, Ojo Caliente, the heart of this ancestral base. This hot springs is located just at the upstream entrance to the box canyon on Alamosa Creek.

The commitment of some Apache bands to a homeland base centered on Ojo Caliente at the entrance to the Cañada Alamosa resulted in consideration by the federal government of an agency for Apache bands that included this geographic area. In 1852, the federal government established a "Southern Apache Agency", that included this area. This Agency originally had sweeping jurisdiction over several Apache bands that roamed over a much wider area than Cañada Alamosa, including the Mimbreño, Mogollon, Coyotero, and, for a time, Mescalero Apache.

Over the years the agency was located at various places in the vicinity of Ojo Caliente (Hot Springs) at the Cañada Alamosa in New Mexico. In 1873 the agency and the reservation was moved to a completely different location in New Mexico, in the Tularosa Valley. However, in 1874 the reservation and agency were moved back to Ojo Caliente, just north of the canyon. During this period, a set of adobe buildings for the agency were built about half a mile east of the upstream mouth of the canyon. Both the reservation and agency were abolished in 1877, when the Indians at the agency were moved to the San Carlos reservation in Arizona, but a man was left in charge of the property at the agency until the following year.

During the most active time that the agency was centered on Ojo Caliente, the Chihenne band produced some outstanding warrior–leaders. Besides Loco, during the time while the community of Cañada Alamosa was flourishing as a trade center for the spoils from Apache raiding parties, the Chihenne were also led by Victorio a famous war chief, and noted for Lozen, Victorio's sister and a skilled warrior and prophetess, and Nana, a noted warrior/chief who raided and fought fiercely through his 80s.

After 1877, upon the final rejection of their request for a reservation near Cañada Alamosa, their homeland, Victorio, Lozen, and Nana with other Warm Springs/Chihenne Apaches fled the San Carlos reservation and conducted a sustained war through 1886. It is known as Victorio's War and was waged in areas away from Cañada Alamosa. It resulted in the death of many Americans and Mexicans and also in the death or capture of most of the surviving Warm Springs/Chihenne Apaches. The captured group, as well as the few remnants of the Warm Springs/Chihenne Band, were considered by the U.S. authorities as part of the Chiricahua band of Apaches, so that they were part of the deportation of Chiricahua to Florida, then Alabama, and eventually a reservation in Oklahoma.

The descendants of the Warm Springs Chiricahua Apache sent to Oklahoma are the Fort Sill Apache Tribe of Oklahoma, who have regained some of their ancestral homelands in New Mexico.

== Bibliography ==
- Shapard, Bud (2010) Chief Loco: Apache Peacemaker, University of Oklahoma Press. Norman, Oklahoma, 1st Edition, ISBN 978-0-8061-4047-6.
- Debo, Angie. Geronimo: The Man, His Time, His Place. Norman, Oklahoma: University of Oklahoma Press. ISBN 0-8061-1828-8.
- Roberts, David (1993, 1994). Once They Moved Like the Wind. New York, New York 10020: Simon and Schuster. pp. 90, 91. ISBN 0-671-88556-1.
