= Carnoviste =

Mescalero Apache war chief

- Born: ca. 1825
- Died: 1876; Mescalero Indian Reservation, New Mexico
- Other name: The Wolf
- Occupation: war chief

Carnoviste (ca. 1825 – 1876) was Mescalero Apache war chief.

His band of a southern Guadalupe Mescalero were based in the Texan Big Bend Country, ranging on both sides of the Rio Grande from the Guadalupe Mountains towards east of the Limpia Mountains (also known as Davis Mountains) onto the edge of the Southern Plains.

Carnoviste's name translates to "The Wolf".

== War leader and chief ==
Trained as a warrior under Marco's leadership, Carnoviste was reported to have committed frequent "depredations" on the San Antonio road; he became a war leader and a band chief probably during the early sixties and the Civil War, when Unionist and Confederate contenders showed a strategic interest for the northern part of the Apache territory (and the northern – Sierrablanca and Sacramento – Mescaleros had to face most of Gen. John R. Baylor and gen. James H. Carleton efforts) but just a little, limited to the San Antonio – El Paso trail, for the southern part.

After the American Civil War, U.S. troops were sent to take control over the southwestern territories, and the "Buffalo Soldiers" of the 9th Cavalry took possession again of Fort Stockton and Fort Davis, along the "Lower Road" from El Paso to San Antonio in the heart of southern Mescalero lands, rebuilding them and patrolling the Texan Big Bend region to stop the restless Mescalero (and mostly southern – Guadalupe and Limpia – Mescalero, among whom, after the Limpia Alsate, also Guadalupe Carnoviste's star was rising) raiding west of the Rio Grande and east of the Pecos. In December 1867 a southern Mescalero party, more than 100 warriors strong, attacked the El Paso – San Antonio coach south-east of El Paso, killing a soldier of the military escort and chasing the coach until Eagle Springs Station, where the Mescaleros were intercepted and repulsed by a troop of the 9th Cavalry.

== Abduction of Herman Lehmann ==
In May 1870, in the Fort Mason vicinity, Carnoviste and his war chief Chevato led a raid against the farm of German settlers, the Lehmann's farm. They kidnapped Wille and Herman Lehmann. Carnoviste adopted Herman Lehmann and taught him Apache ways.

In 1874 Carnoviste, after seeing his band repeatedly assaulted and badly hit by their old Comanche enemies, promoted a council of Mescalero, Mimbreño and Lipan Apache chiefs; among the others, attended the council Alsate, with his "segundos" Zorrillo and Colorado (Avispa Colorada, chief of a Lipan band joint to the Limpia Mescalero chief), probably the Sacramento Mescalero chiefs Caballero and San Juan, aging Mimbreño chief Nana (married among the Mescalero people) and the great Mimbreño chief Victorio: on which occasion Victorio succeeded in persuading the council to send peace messengers to the Comanches and Kiowas, who accepted the peace and friendship agreement; during the spring 1874, as many other southern Mescaleros, Carnoviste and his people went to Mexico, but, chased by regular Mexican soldiers and rurales, Carnoviste's band was forced to go back to Texas, where they were captured by the "Buffalo Soldiers" of the 10th Cavalry; in the reservation, 20 Mescaleros of Carnoviste's band died because of a pestilence and the chief led back to Mexico his people; attacked and chased by Mexican troops, Carnoviste and his Mescaleros were forced to ford again the Rio Grande to Texas, but, just forded the river, they were attacked by U.S. Cavalry and lost over 60 people (warriors and non combatants) before managing to break away to a sanctuary somewhere in the Big Bend between the Rio Grande and the Pecos.

== Sundown and death ==
After some lucky raids in the 1875 spring and summer, still chased by the Texas Rangers, Carnoviste's band reached Fort Sill to surrender, but the chief didn't want to give up his adopted son and tried to flee again, only to surrender again at Pinos Blancos (New Mexico) in the late 1875 with his last 70 Apache.

Carnoviste was killed by his fellow Mescaleros from his band. In the spring 1876 Carnoviste was killed by a medicine man of his band in a drunken brawl. His adopted son, Herman Lehmann then killed the medicine man with a bow-and-arrow and had to leave the tribe, and the trusty war chief, Chivat, succeeded him in the chieftainship.
