= Delgadito (Apache chief) =

Delgadito (not to be confused with at least two homonymous Navajo chiefs) whose Apache name was Tudeevia was a chief (nantan) of the Copper Mines group of Tchihende (Mimbreño) people, one of the three divisions (Tchihende, Chiricahua and Ndendahe) of central Apaches.

== War-leader and chief ==
As a young warrior and later as a war leader and a chief, Delgadito fought under Tchihende chief Juan Josè (later to be his uncle) and Fuerte. Later, he served under their successors Mangas Coloradas (chief of the "Coppermine" Mimbreño subdivision and principal chief of the Tchihende Apaches) and Cuchillo Negro (chief of the "Warm Springs" Mimbreño subdivision, with Nana as an able lieutenant and second-ranking chief of the Tchihende Apaches). He succeeded Mangas Coloradas as chief of the "Coppermine" Mimbreños.

He played a significant role in Apache warfare from 1851 to the mid-1860s, along with his contemporaries Cochise (who would go on to be the principal chief of the Tsokanende or Chiricahua) and Nana, as well as younger leaders such as Victorio, Loco, Juh, Chihuahua, and Geronimo.

It is possible that he was not the real leader of all the Mimbreños, however, since in the meantime the younger Victorio, Mangas Coloradas's son-in-law, achieved even higher fame and prestige because of his achievements as a warrior and a warlord, succeeding Cuchillo Negro as chief of the "Warm Springs" Mimbreños to every extent. Nana continued to be a lieutenant and long-time ally of Victorio.

Delgadito stood side by side with Mangas Coloradas and Cuchillo Negro many times, and acted for them in dealing with North Americans and Mexicans. After parleys in the spring of 1850, Delgadito and some other Mimbreño and Nednhi chiefs signed a treaty that summer in Janos with Chihuahua representatives.

In June 1851, Delgadito, Ponce and Coleto Amarillo accompanied Mangas Coloradas to Santa Rita del Cobre to meet John R. Bartlett, the U.S. commissioner appointed by Washington to the United States and Mexican Boundary Commission, until the Apaches did not feel disappointed and betrayed by the Anglo-American newcomers. In the same year of 1851, the Santa Rita del Cobre copper mines were reopened and white people (mostly miners) overran the area of Pinos Altos and Santa Rita, imposing their rule and giving deference to the Mexicans according to the agreements with the Mexican Government. In spite of the good will of the chiefs (Mangas Coloradas, Cuchillo Negro, Delgadito, Ponce and Coleto Amarillo), who had to intervene repeatedly to prevent any drastic reaction by the warriors, relations became more and more difficult until the Apaches broke them.
