= Loco (Apache) =

Apache chief

- Jlin-tay-i-tith, "Stops His Horse"
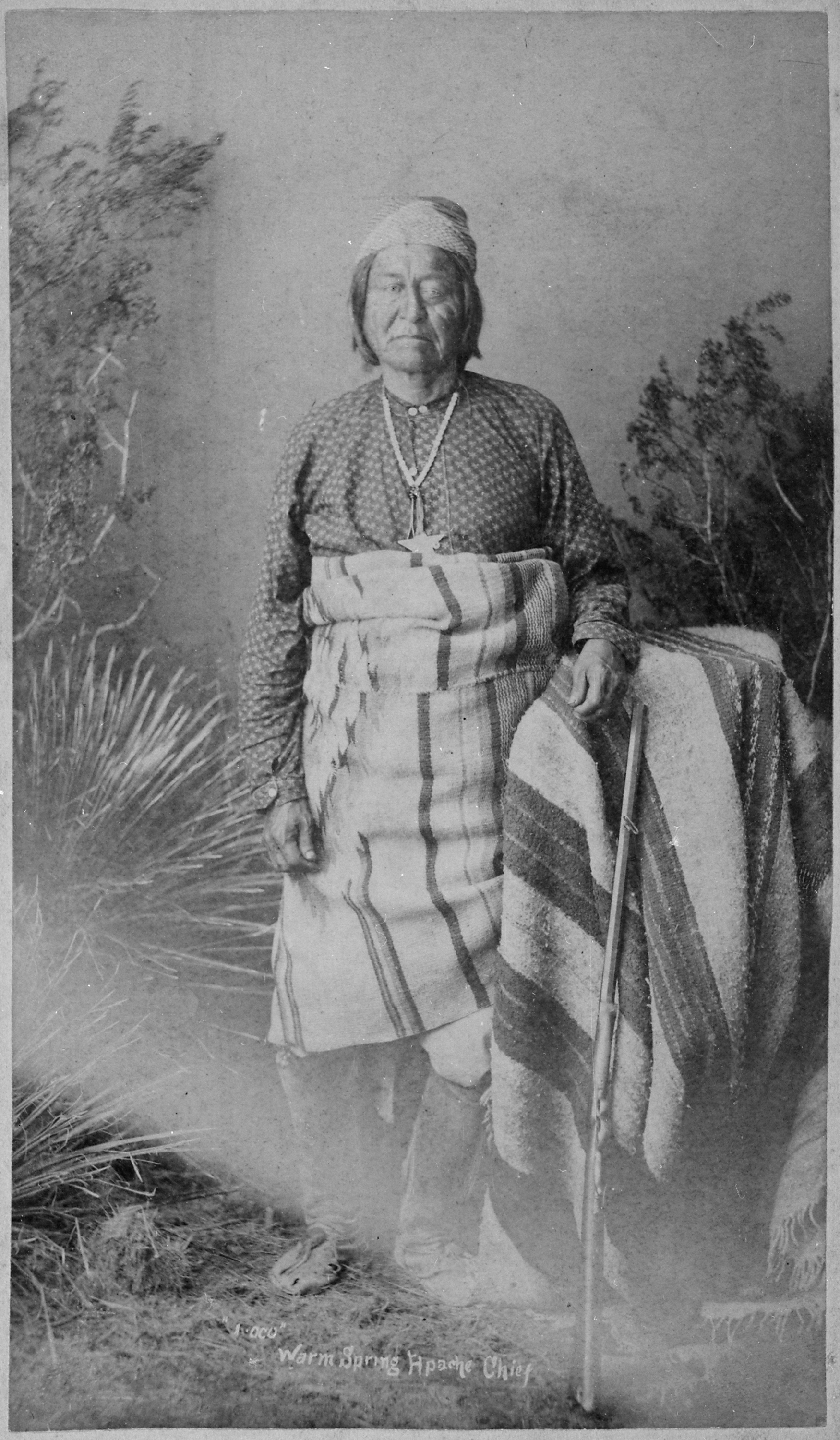
- Loco, Warm Springs Apache Chief

Chiricahua leader

Personal details
- Born: c. 1823
- Died: 2 February 1905 Fort Sill, Oklahoma
- Resting place: Fort Sill, Oklahoma
- Spouse: Ruth
- Known for: Pursuing peace between Apaches and whites

Loco (c. 1823–2 February 1905) was a Copper Mines Mimbreño Apache chief who was known for seeking peace at all costs with the US Army, despite the outlook of his fellow Apaches like Victorio and Geronimo.

== Name ==
Loco's Apache name was Jlin-tay-i-tith, "Stops His Horse". One theory suggested that he earned his nickname, "Loco", because he was 'crazy' enough to trust the white men." Yet, this view is not held by most historians. Bud Shapard, former chief of the Bureau of Research at the BIA from 1978 to 1987, points out that he got his name from his actions at a battle against the Mexicans, where he supposedly braved gunfire in order to save an injured warrior. Loco related this story to John Gregory Bourke in 1882 as well.

== Time as chief ==
After the deaths of Cuchillo Negro, chief of the Warm Springs Tchihende, (1857) and Mangas Coloradas, chief of the Copper Mines Tchihende, (1863), the Copper Mines Mimbreños and the Warm Springs Mimbreños, under Pindah's pressure, were forced to leave the Pinos Altos area, near Santa Rita del Cobre, and try to concentrate in the Ojo Caliente area. Both of the tribe's bands after Delgadito's death in 1864 had dual chiefs: the Copper Mines Tchihende were under Loco and the Warm Springs Tchihende were under Victorio (who, already chosen as his son-in-law by Mangas Coloradas, was preferred to the older Nana).

The Mimbreños accepted to settle in a reservation at Ojo Caliente and later at Cañada Alamosa, but the Mimbreño reservation was abolished, and Victorio's and Loco's people was sent to the Mescalero reservation at Tularosa. When the Government stated to deport the Mimbreños to San Carlos, in 1877 Victorio and Loco led back their people to Ojo Caliente, but, in 1878, 9th Cavalry was sent to bring them back to San Carlos. Victorio took again the warpath, but Loco was arrested and could not join Victorio in his last war in 1879–1880, remaining in the San Carlos reservation.

In 1882, when a party of Apaches including Geronimo forced Loco to leave for Mexico, Loco instead waged guerilla warfare against the Chiricahuas. In 1886, Loco went to Washington, D.C. to negotiate; however, like Geronimo, he was made prisoner and sent to Florida.

== Legacy ==
Unlike the militants Geronimo and Victorio, Loco was an advocate for peace.

Loco was a strong proponent of education and was the first chief to send his children to school while at San Carlos Agency in 1884. Another of his sons was the first to attend the Indian school in Alabama in 1889.
