= Eve Ball =

American historian (1890-1984)

Katherine Evelyn Daly Ball
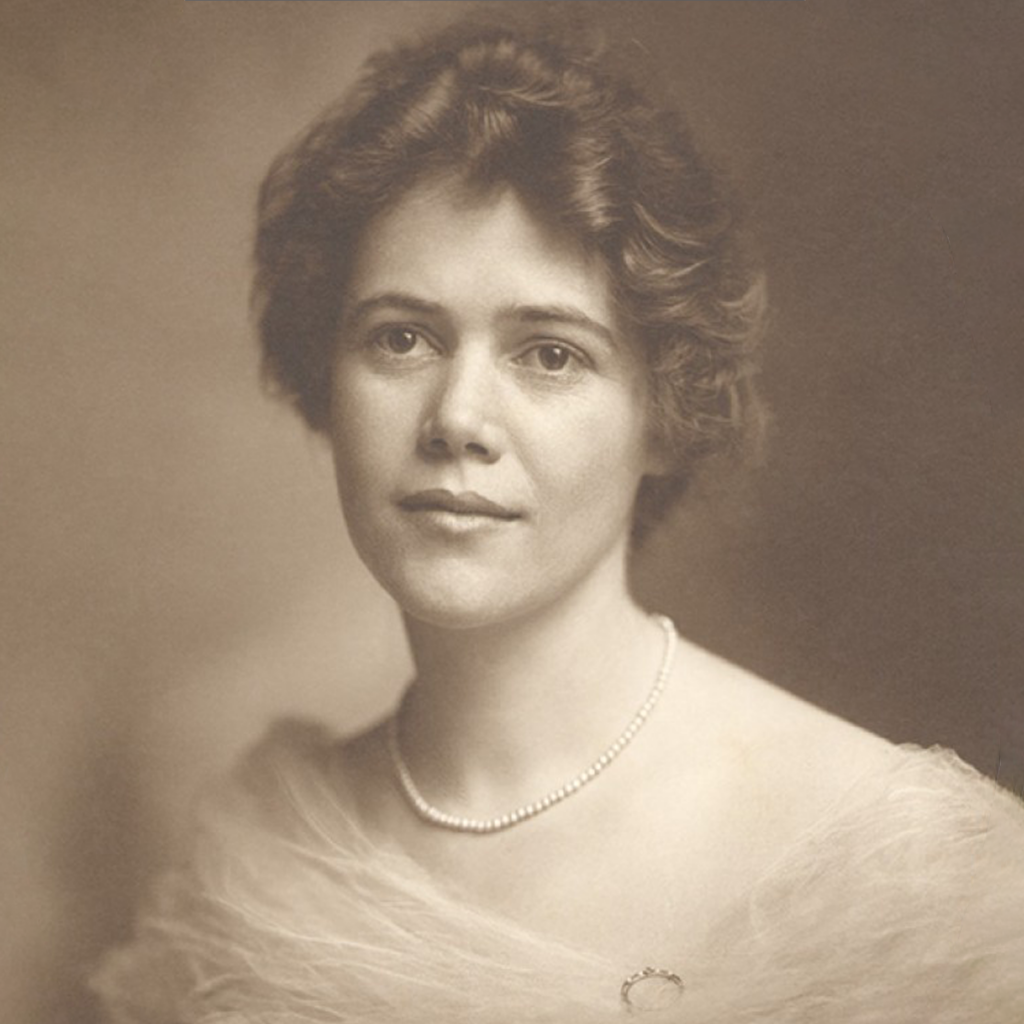
- Born: 14 March 1890; Clarksville, Tennessee, US
- Died: 24 December 1984 (aged 94); Ruidoso, New Mexico, US
- Education: Kansas State Teachers College of Pittsburg (B.S.); Kansas State University (M.A.)
- Occupation: Historian
- Awards: Golden Spur Award; Saddleman's Award; Cowgirl Hall of Fame

Eve Ball (14 March 1890 – 24 December 1984) was an American historian of the American West and a teacher. She is best known for her oral research and books on Apache Native American tribes, particularly Indeh: An Apache Odessey. In 1981, she received the Saddleman's Award, "the Oscar of western writing" for Indeh: An Apache Odessey.

== Early life and education ==
Katherine Evelyn Daly Ball was born on 14 March 1890 in Kentucky. She was born to Samuel Richard and Gazelle (Gibbs) Daly; Daly was the first woman doctor in Kansas. Her family moved to a cattle ranch in Kansas when she was young. She began reading at the age of four, and by the age of twelve, was bored with traditional education. She began teaching in Kansas schools by the age of sixteen. Ball was known as a tomboy and even coached a junior high school boys basketball team. She earned her Bachelor of Science degree in education at Kansas State Teachers College of Pittsburg in 1918 and became a teacher. Ball graduated with a Master of Arts in education from Kansas State University in 1934.

== Career ==
During the Dust Bowl, she taught English at a junior college in Dodge City, Kansas. During World War II, she worked at oil refineries as a chemist in Hobbs, New Mexico. She was married to Joseph P. Ball, who was a captain of the Kansas National Guard, but he died in World War I. She purchased Hermosa Inn, then called La Casa Hermosa from artist Lon Megargee, operating a dude ranch there, but she later gave it up because it was too much work to maintain and it prevented her from having time to write. Ball spent most of her career teaching, eventually settling in Ruidoso, New Mexico. She purchased property near Nob Hill in Ruidoso. To make a living, she ran an antique store from her home and constructed and leased apartments on her property. She wrote articles from the observations she made and stories she heard. In New Mexico, she became interested in Native Americans and the American West. She began researching them in the 1940s and interviewed southwestern pioneers and Apaches at a time when there was no academic interest in those subjects or oral histories in general. She had the opportunity to interview descendants and relatives of Geronimo, Victorio, Nana, and Juh. She used shorthand to take notes from the interviews to prevent intimidating interviewees with video and tape recording. She would read them back to her interviewees to correct errors or ask more questions. She is well known for seeking out and sharing the Apache point of view of encounters with colonizers. In 1967, the Folklore Society of New Mexico presented a plaque to J. Frank Dobie, N. Howard Thorp, and Ball at Zimmerman Library at the University of New Mexico. Ball was given an honorary doctorate by College of Artesia in 1972. In 1972, she edited and created a book from a recovered manuscript by Lily Klasner. She published In the Days of Victorio: Recollections of a Warm Springs Apache in 1970 and Indeh: An Apache Odessy in 1980. Because of the strong relationship she gained with Apache member Daklugie (Geronimo's nephew and Juh's son), he gifted Ball his war club which he had hidden for 27 years as a prisoner of war and then recovered.

She received the Golden Spur Award from the Western Writers of America in 1975 for the best non-fiction short story Buried Money, published in True West Magazine. She also won the Saddleman’s Award, "the Oscar of western writing" in 1981 for Indeh, an Apache Odyssey, a compilation of interviews with Apaches. Few women had received the Saddleman Award at that point in time and she considered receiving the award one of her proudest moments. The following year Ball was inducted into the Cowgirl Hall of Fame. Ball was a guest speaker in May 1978 for the World Business Council. On October 7, 1983, the United States Senate passed resolution S.Res.230 to commend Eve Ball. Ball died in Ruidoso, New Mexico, on 24 December 1984. She continued to write up until her death, despite losing her eyesight. Ball wrote countless stories and book manuscripts that were never published. Ball's mentee Lynda A. Sanchez wrote and compiled a photo essay about Ball called, Eve Ball, Woman Among Men in 2007. In 2009, The New Mexico Women's Forum placed a marker honoring Eve Ball along highway 380, in Lincoln County, New Mexico for "saving oral histories certain to be lost without her". Eve Ball's papers reside at Brigham Young University.

== Works ==
Books

- Ball, Eve (1963). Ruidoso: The Last Frontier. Naylor, Co.
- Ball, Eve; Crosby, Thelma (1966). Bob Crosby: World Champion Cowboy. Clarendon, Texas: Clarendon Press.
- Ball, Eve (1969). Ma'am Jones of the Pecos. Tucson, Arizona: The University of Arizona Press. ISBN 978-0816504046.
- Ball, Eve (1970). In the Days of Victorio: Recollections of a Warm Springs Apache. Tucson, Arizona: The University of Arizona Press. ISBN 9780816504015.
- Klasner, Lily (1972). Ball, Eve (ed.). My Girlhood Among Outlaws. Tucson, Arizona: University of Arizona Press. ISBN 9780816503544.
- Ball, Eve; Henn, Nora; Sanchez, Lynda A. (1980). Indeh: An Apache Odyssey. Norman, Oklahoma: University of Oklahoma Press. ISBN 9780806121659.

Journal articles

- Ball, Eve (Winter 1965). "The Apache Scouts: A Chiricahua Appraisal". Arizona and the West. 7 (4): 315–328. JSTOR 40167138.

Short stories

- Ball, Eve (1974). "Buried Money". True West Magazine.
