= Alsate =

Last Chief of the Chisos band of Limpia Mescalero Apaches

- Born: c. 1820
- Died: 1881/1882 (aged 61-62); Ojinaga, Chihuahua, Mexico
- Cause of death: Execution
- Known for: Leader of the Limpia Mescalero Apache

Alsate, also known as Arzate, Arzatti, and Pedro Múzquiz, (ca. 1820 – 1881/1882) was the last chief of the Chisos band of Limpia Mescalero Apaches.

He was the son of Josè Miguel Maria del Refugio Sabas Muzquiz Gonzalez, who was captured by the Mescalero as a boy at what is now Melchor Múzquiz in Coahuila, Mexico, and raised among them, and his Indian wife. When he came of age and proved himself, Alsate became the leader of a Mescalero band. They ranged through the Limpia Mountains (later rebaptized Davis Mountains by Anglo-American newcomers), Chisos Mountains and Chinati Mountains in the Big Bend area of Texas, the Sierra del Carmen of Coahuila and the Sierra Alamos in Chihuahua north of the Bolsón de Mapimí.

== War-leader and chief ==
In 1849, Alsate was a war leader in the failed Mescalero and Lipan expedition against Santa Rosa of Coahuila, scheduled on December 24, 1849. The Mescaleros, mostly the southern bands, known as Guadalupe and Limpia Mescalero, used to frequent Fort Leaton settled by North American barterer Ben Leaton in 1848 at old adobe building already called El Fortin. It was located on the Texan side of the Rio Grande near Presidio, Texas, largely extended on the surrounding grounds along the shore and equipped with warehouses and corrals, where the Apaches could get guns, gunpowder and ammunitions in exchange for the booty of their raids to Chihuahua and Coahuila. The Chisos had become Fort Leaton's very active customers and suppliers. During the decades 1850 - 1860, Alsate, by now war-chief and then principal chief of the Chisos band, and one among the most important Limpia Mescalero chiefs after Gomez's disappearance, became a notorious Apache raider, operative through Texas, Chihuahua and Coahuila and dominating the Texan Big Bend area. During the decades 1860 - 1870, while the Northern (Sierra Blanca and Sacramento) Mescaleros had been forced to accept their restriction in a reservation, the Southern (Guadalupe and Limpia) Mescaleros saved their freedom and didn't give up the old way of raiding along both sides of the Rio Grande, sometimes in partnership with the Mimbreños or the Lipans, and Alsate's Chisos band was a leading player.

As well as Carnoviste, chief of a Guadalupe Mescalero band, Alsate too became a close ally to Victorio about 1874. Relations between the Indigenous people and the authorities on both sides of the border were generally peaceful at first, although Alsate was almost shot for stealing the coat of the trader John D. Burgess. Alsate's band had intended to rob Burgess' convoy but the two talked and ended up as friends, and Burgess had given Alsate his coat as a gift. Victorio's breakout from San Carlos Reservation in September 1877 alarmed the troops in the whole Apache territory, and, in November–December 1877, Alsate's warriors clashed twice with 8th Cavalry. On November 30, companies A and K, respectively led by Capt. A.B. Wells with Lt. F.E. Phelps, and by Capt. S.B. Young with Lt. John L. Bullis, trespassed the Rio Grande border running after Alsate's band in the Sierra Madre del Carmen, Mexico. They killed or wounding some Apaches, destroyed the camp and captured some horses, donkeys and mules. On December 4, Capt. Young, with troop K, and Lt. Bullis, with a detachment of Black Seminole scouts, after chasing the Chisos for several weeks, attacked the Apache group led by Alsate and his sub-chiefs Zorrillo (Chisos Limpia Mescaleros) and Colorado (probably the chief of a smaller Lipan band joint to the Chisos Mescaleros, and likely to be identified with Avispa Colorada, connected to Alsate e Carnoviste in 1874). Alsate led his people to Chihuahua.

Alsate felt himself safe in his stronghold near San Carlos of Chihuahua, but, in 1878, complaints to the Mexican authorities about the band's raids on farms and traders brought President Porfirio Díaz to order Alsate's arrest. Colonel José Garza Galán de Santa Rosa was dispatched with a force of a hundred men and surprised him and his followers at his farm near San Carlos de Chihuahua, and they were extradited to Mexico City to be jailed in la Acordada. Alsate's father was in the group and was freed after convincing his brother Manuel of his identity. Manuel Múzquiz wrote a note requesting clemency for Alsate, but could not release him; however, in December 1879 he and his followers were able to escape from the carts transporting them and vanish into the mountains.

== Last standing and death ==
The following year Colonel Ortiz of El Paseo del Norte lured them into a trap at San Carlos of Chihuahua by promising a peace treaty; they were set upon after eating and drinking heavily at a celebratory feast, and while those few who were able to fight were killed, the rest were sold into slavery. Alsate and his war chiefs Colorado and Zorillo were executed at Ojinaga.
