= Baishan (Apache) =

Tchihende Apache chieftain

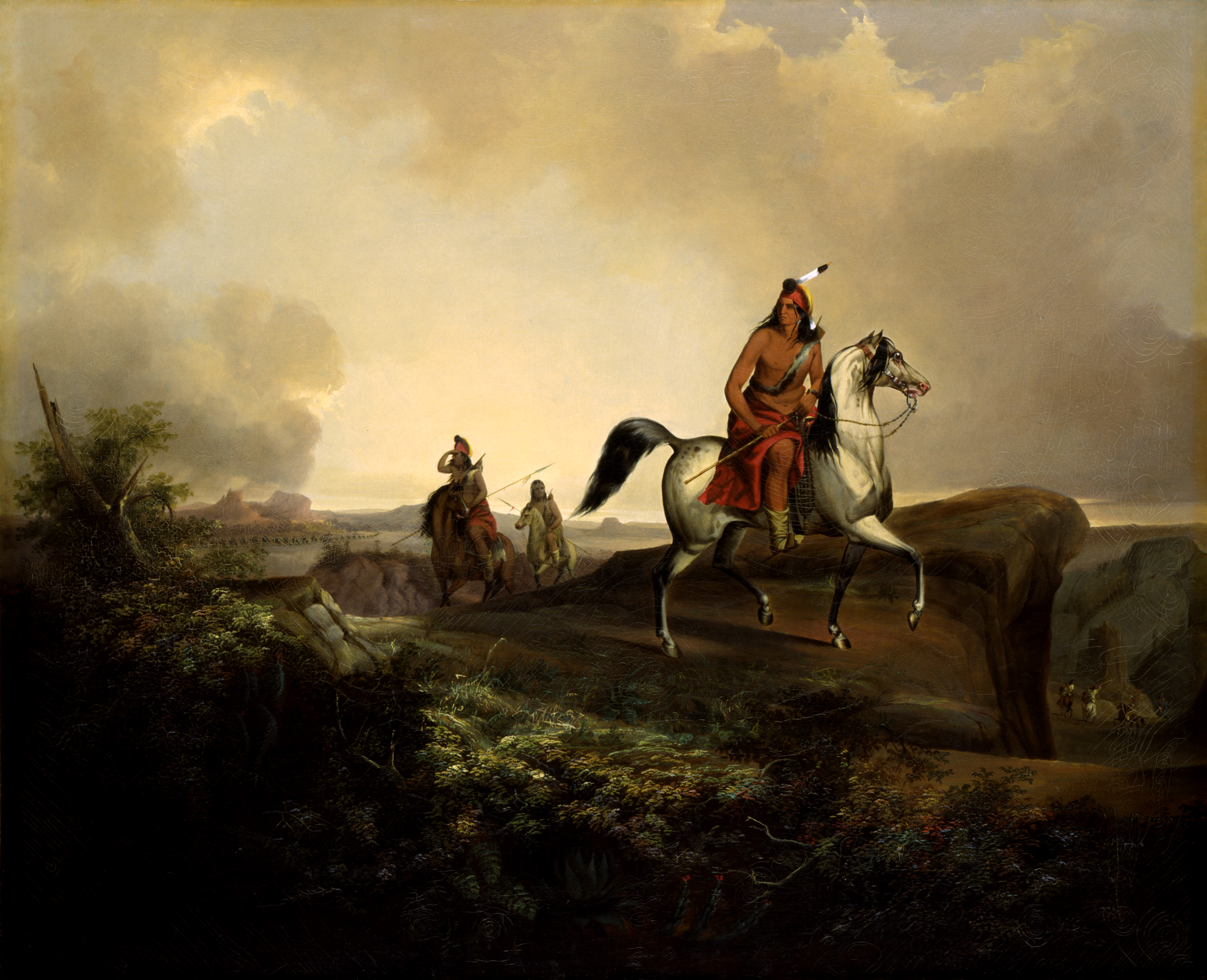
- Black Knife, painting by John Mix Stanley, 1846.

Tchihende Apache leader

Personal details
- Born: c. 1796
- Died: 1857 (aged 60–61)
- Known for: principal chief of the Warm Spring Tchihende (Mimbreño Apache) and second-ranking chief of the Tchihende (Mimbreño Apache) after Mangas Coloradas
- Nickname(s): Black Knife, Cuchillo Negro, Knife

Baishan, Spanish name Cuchillo Negro (Black Knife) (c. 1796 – May 24, 1857), was a Tchihende (Mimbres) Apache chieftain, of the Warm Springs Apache Band during the 1830s to 1850s.

== Apache war-leader and chief ==
Baishan ("Knife"), son of the famed chief Fuerte aka Soldato Fiero, was a most respected war leader among the Tchihende bands along almost three decades from the beginning of 1830s, and the principal chief the Warm Springs local group of the Tchihende ("Chihenne") Apaches after Fuerte's death in 1837 near Janos; he was also the second principal chief of the whole Tchihende (or Mimbreño) Apaches after his long-time companion (and possibly brother-in-law) Mangas Coloradas, chief of the Coppermine local group of the same Tchihende (or "Chihenne") Apaches. His name was translated by the Mexicans as Cuchillo ("Knife") or Cuchillo Negro ("Black Knife"), because of the Apache practice of blackening their weapons to make them less conspicuous.

About 1835 (or 1837), Fuerte, chief of the Warmspring Mimbreño Apache, was killed near Santa Rita del Cobre by Mexican troops belonging to the garrison of Janos, but Juan José Compa, the old leader of the Coppermine Mimbreño Apaches who was friendly to the Mexicans, rejected Cuchillo Negro's request of help to assault and destroy Santa Rita; Cuchillo Negro led a bloody raid to Sonora. After Juan José Compa too was killed for bounty money in 1837 in the massacre at Santa Rita del Cobre, Cuchillo Negro joined Mangas Coloradas in his revenge, the two chiefs operating a series of retaliatory raids against the Mexicans, killing and destroying all around the mining town and placing Santa Rita under siege, finally attacking the column of fleeing Mexicans and slaughtering a large number. In 1844 Cuchillo Negro was falsely claimed to have been killed by Mexican troops in the Oputo Mountains.

In 1847, to revenge the Galeana massacre, Cuchillo Negro called a council with the Tchihende (Mimbreño), Tsokanende (Chiricahua) and Ndendahe (Mogollon) chiefs. Late in that autumn Mangas Coloradas, Cuchillo Negro and, probably, the Tsokanende leaders Miguel Narbona, Tapilà and Yrigollen went to raid Chihuahua with 200 warriors, occupying Ramos, near Janos, and killing most of the inhabitants. In 1848 Mangas Coloradas and Cuchillo Negro with their Mimbreños, and Miguel Narbona and Yrigollen with their Chiricahuas, attacked Sonora, and on February 18 they burned Chinapa, killing or capturing many Mexicans.

Cuchillo Negro's name is mentioned in military and civilian records of treaties and other dealings with Apaches during the early years of U.S. jurisdiction over the New Mexico Territory. In 1851 the settlement at Santa Rita del Cobre of the U.S. delegation (with General J.R. Bartlett) in the Mexican-American Border Commission and the reopening of the Santa Rita del Cobre copper mines effected a meeting with the Anglo-American newcomers; and Cuchillo Negro, just as Mangas Coloradas, Delgadito, Ponce, Coleto Amarillo and all the most important Tchihende and Ndendahe chiefs, had to face new problems. In June 1851 Mangas Coloradas, with Delgadito, Ponce and Coleto Amarillo, went to Santa Rita del Cobre to meet General Bartlett. The discussions went on until the Apaches no longer felt themselves disappointed and betrayed by the newcomers. Cuchillo Negro, too, had to face some problems in connection with some young Mexican boys who had been adopted into his band. In 1853, along with Ponce, Delgadito and Victorio, he signed a treaty in Fort Webster with Indian agent Edward H. Wingfield, who had been sent by the governor of the New Mexico Territory, William Carr Lane.

== Death ==
The U. S. Army claims Cuchillo Negro was killed in the Black Range by Pueblo scouts, under Col. William W. Loring, during the Bonneville Expedition in 1857 (May 25, Cañon de los Muertos Carneros). However, the Fort Sill Apache, Chiricahua – Warm Springs Mimbreño Apache website argues that he "Died in the revenge raid on Ramos (1850)." Famed Nana (Kas-tziden, "Broken Foot") was his natural heir as chief of the Warm Spring Tchihende, but young Victorio's rising star overtook him since the early years 1860.

== Legacy ==
Several geological features in Sierra County, New Mexico bear his name: Cuchillo Negro Mountains, Cuchillo Negro Creek, and the town of Cuchillo, New Mexico.

A painting of Cuchillo Negro on horseback was done by John Mix Stanley in 1846. The painting hangs in the Smithsonian American Art Museum. It measures 42 1/2 x 52 in. (107.8 x 132.1 cm). Since Apaches traditionally did not wear feathers in this way there is some doubt the artist ever saw his subject.

A fictional version of "Black Knife" is portrayed by Raoul Trujillo in the 2011 science fiction film, Cowboys & Aliens.
