= Ojo Caliente (Socorro County, New Mexico) =

Spring in Socorro County, New Mexico

Coordinates: 33°34′26″N 107°35′38″W

Ojo Caliente, is a spring in the Monticello Canyon in Socorro County, New Mexico. It is located at an elevation of 6,263 feet (1,909 meters) in Spring Canyon, a tributary of Alamosa Creek. It was the central landmark of the Apache land known as Cañada Alamosa.

The Apache tribe, specifically the Chiricahua, were very fond of the area. Vincent Colyer considered setting up a reservation here in the 19th century, but believed that the amount of arable land was "far too small" for their needs.
