= Mescalero =

Native American tribe in New Mexico

Mescalero Apache
Naa'dahéńdé (Mescalero-Chiricahua)
- Location of Mescalero Apache Nation Reservation

Total population
- 64,484 total Apache 8,652 MATReservation

Regions with significant populations

Languages
- Mescalero, English, Spanish

Religion
- Catholic Religion, Mescalero and Native Cultural Heritage

Related ethnic groups
- Western Apache, San Carlos Apache, White Mountain Apache, Navajo

Mescalero or Mescalero Apache (Mescalero-Chiricahua: Naa'dahéńdé) is an Apache tribe of Southern Athabaskan–speaking Native Americans. The tribe is federally recognized as the Mescalero Apache Tribe of the Mescalero Apache Reservation, located in south-central New Mexico.

In the 19th century, the Mescalero opened their reservation to other Apache tribes, such as the Mimbreno (Chíhéńde, Warm Springs Apaches) and the Chiricahua (Shá’i’áńde or Chidikáágu). Some Lipan Apache (Tú’édįnéńde and Túntsańde) also joined the reservation. Their descendants are enrolled in the Mescalero Apache Tribe.

== Reservation ==
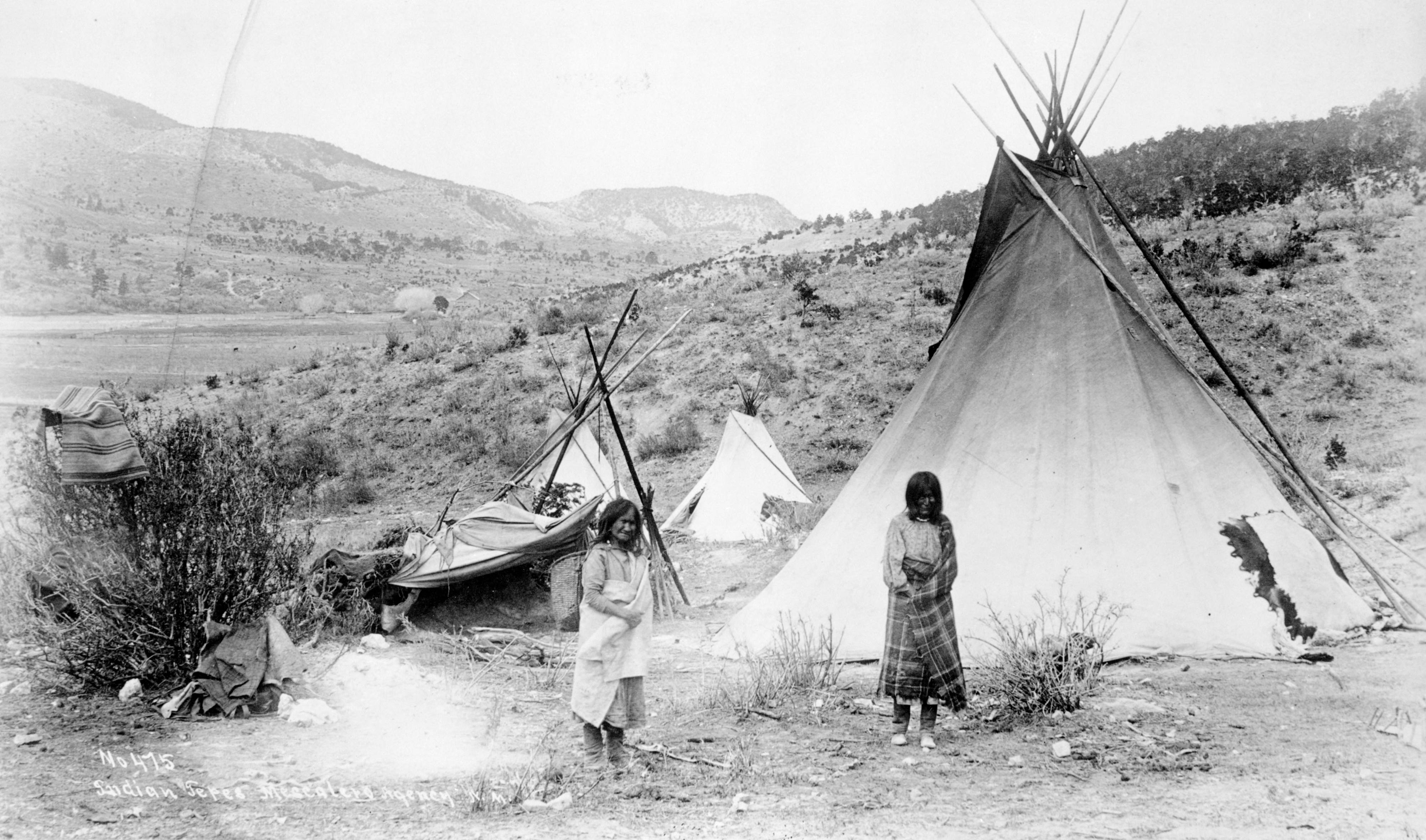
Two Mescalero women, with tipis and ramada (to the left) est. c. 1900

Originally established on May 27, 1873, by executive order of President Ulysses S. Grant, the reservation was first located near Fort Stanton (Zhúuníidu). The present reservation was established in 1883. It has a land area of 1,862.463 km^{2} (719.101 sq mi), almost entirely in Otero County. The 463,000-acre (187,000-hectare) reservation lies on the eastern flank of the Sacramento Mountains and borders the Lincoln National Forest. A small, unpopulated section is in Lincoln County just southwest of Ruidoso (Tsé tághe' si'â-yá). U.S. Route 70 is the major highway through the reservation.

Given that the Mescalero Tribal lands in the Lincoln National Forest are scenic, most of the tribal economy is in hospitality and tourism. The trades and ranching also contribute to their growing economy. With a growing technology sector their Native Innovation Centers and multi state University Consortiums will soon provide a robust research and development sector to their economy.

The Mescalero Department of Resource Management and Land Development celebrated 60 years of success in 2022 on the 20th anniversary of their two premier tourist destination resorts. The Mescalero designed, developed and own the Inn of the Mountain Gods (IMG) Casino and Golf Resort within the Lincoln National Forest, which sits on Lake Mescalero fed by Carrizo Creek. The Mescalero designed, developed, own and operate Ski Apache Resort in the Sierra Blanca Mountains. This is the southernmost large ski resort in New Mexico. The Mescalero ownership and management of these facilities including all of the Alpine Sports including equestrian center and zip lines requires effective resource management. They reflect the entrepreneurial vision and resilience of the Mescalero Tribe. These resorts are premier destination tourism spots according to New Mexico, US, North American and global travel guides. Native American heritage combined with one-of-a kind resorts that features hand made cultural accessories to high tech operations. The mountains and foothills are forested with pines; resource and commercial development are managed carefully by the Mescalero Apache Tribal Council. The Mescalero Apache developed a cultural center near the tribal headquarters on U.S. Route 70 in the reservation's largest community of Mescalero. On display are tribal artifacts and important historical information. The tribe also operates another, larger museum on the western flank of the Sacramento Mountains in Dog Canyon, south of Alamogordo (T'iis ntsaadz-í 'úú'á). New museums and exhibits are being planned to fully capture the Mescalero Space Innovation integration capabilities through partnerships with the New Mexico Space Consortium, Spaceport America, NASA, other commercial space companies, the Intl Institute for Homeland Security Defense and US military partners (Air Force-AFRL and Space Force) the Mescalero Apache Space Innovation and Integration Centers.

The ski area is situated adjacent to the massive peak of Sierra Blanca (Dziãgais'â-ní = "sacred mountain") a 12,003-foot (3,659 m) mountain. It is the southernmost alpine peak in the continental United States, and is part of the Sacramento Mountains. Using the EPA's Level III Ecoregion System, derived from Omernik, this mountain is included in the Arizona/New Mexico Mountains, which are south of the Southern Rocky Mountains of northern New Mexico. Sierra Blanca Peak, located on the reservation, is sacred ground for the Mescalero Apache Tribe. They do not allow access without a permit.

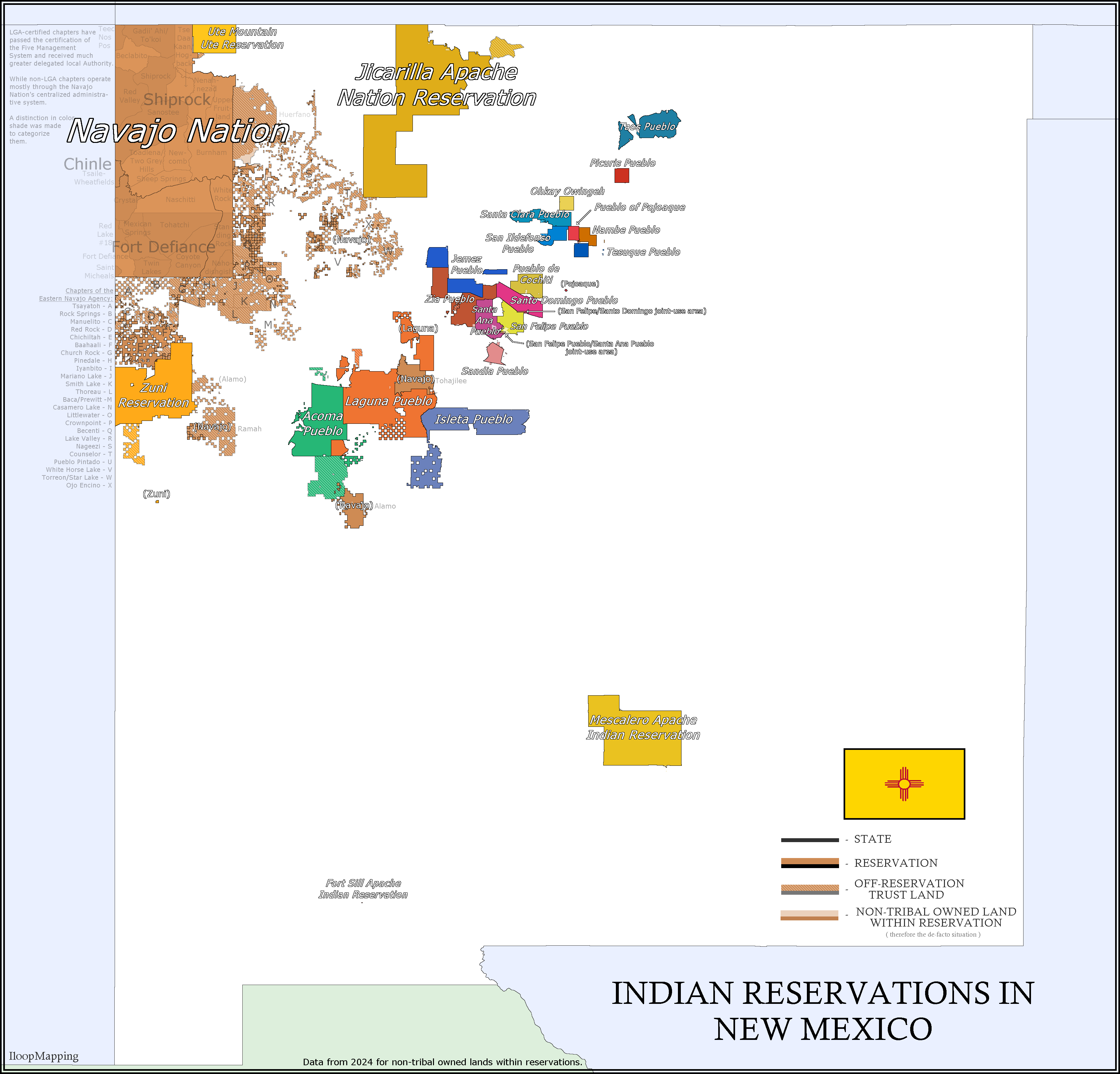
Map of the Mescalero Apache and neighboring tribes (In yellow).

== Tribal government ==
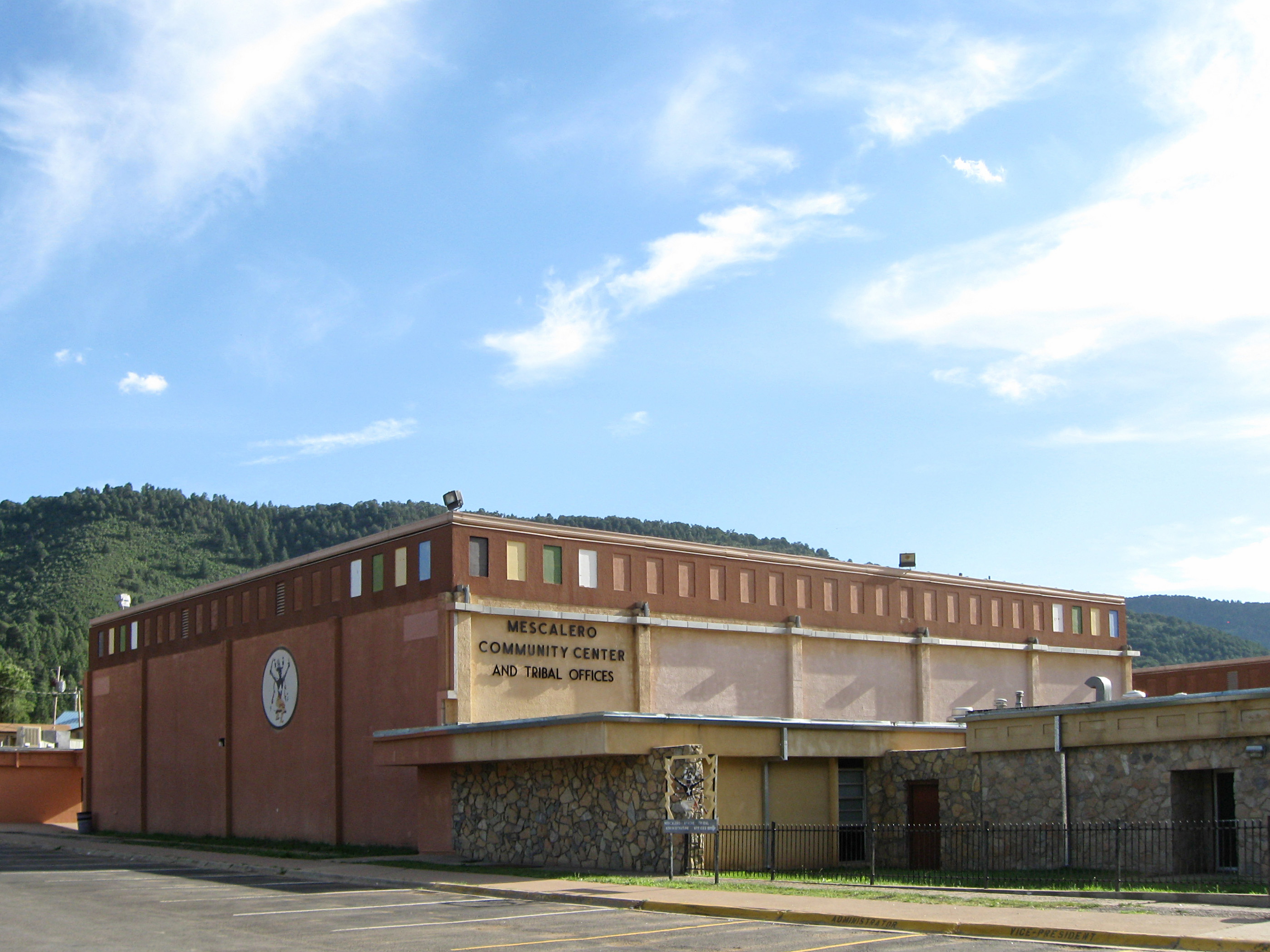
Mescalero Apache Tribal Administrative Offices and Community Center in Mescalero, New Mexico

The Mescalero Apache Tribe holds elections for the office of president every two years. The eight tribal council members also are elected for two years. Strong woman leadership is welcomed and encouraged in the Mescalero Apache Tribal Council. Election for the council is held every year, when one half of the members are up for re-election. The Apache nation of over 64,000 coordinate with each other through tribal meetings. The tribe comprised over 12,468 with 8,652 according to the United States Census.

In 1959, the tribe elected Virginia Klinekole as its first woman president. She later was elected to the tribal council, serving on it until 1986. The tribe repeatedly re-elected Wendell Chino as president; he served a total of 43 years, until his death on November 4, 1998.

Soon after Chino's death, the late Sara Misquez was elected as president. Chino's son, Mark Chino, also has been elected and served as president.

In 2022, Eddie Martinez was sworn in as the new president of the Mescalero Apache tribe. Leadership from Holloman Airforce Base attended the tribal council ceremony for the newly elected president, officers, and Tribal Council. Kelton Starr, retired Army veteran and Tribal Defense Liaison maintained coordination with the Defense Research Labs and US military bases in New Mexico. The new leadership was focused on building on past successes and accelerating economic development projects with a new focus on Native Innovation and the “Made-in-Native-America” campaign. Martinez was appointed chair of the Native American Regional Commission (comprising all 34 states with Federally recognized tribes) to accelerate economic security, development, and defense projects that benefit the Mescalero Apache Tribe and all Native American and other Indigenous peoples.

In 2024, Thora Walsh Padilla serves as the tribe's president alongside Vice President Duane Duffy.

== Culture and language ==
The Mescalero language is a Southern Athabaskan language which is a subfamily of the Athabaskan and Dené–Yeniseian families. Mescalero is part of the southwestern branch of this subfamily; it is very closely related to Chiricahua, and more distantly related to Western Apache. These are considered the three dialects of Apachean. Although Navajo is a related Southern Athabaskan language, its language and culture are considered distinct from those of the Apache.

The Mescalero Apache were primarily a nomadic mountain people. They were innovative warriors, stealthy, fierce, precise and tactical. Their capabilities are forever recognized as superior military tactics. Modern defense industrial base utilizes this irregular warfare precision and “brand” in naming the most superior military aircraft i.e. the Boeing Manufactured Apache helicopter, the Sikorsky Blackhawk etc. after the Native Americans. They traveled east on the arid plains to hunt the buffalo and south into the desert for gathering Mescal Agave. Spanish colonists associated them with this plant and named them Mescalero Apache. The Mescalero Apache, along with the other Apache groups, lived by traditional hunting and gathering. The Mescalero Apache culture protected the ecology and were able to utilize their resources very effectively.

The Mescalero Apache relied on hunting and gathering for subsistence. Men led the hunting parties for buffalo, antelope, and deer. Women accompanied men and dressed the meat and skins and would also participate in the hunting of small game such as rabbits. Women would gather Mescal Agave in groups of 4–10 people, mainly consisting of female friends and family members and usually several men. Men would also take an active role in the processing of mescal.

Family descent was matrilineal, but men's heritage would be remembered especially if there was a famous warrior in his lineage. Extended families consisted of grandparents, unmarried children, and their remarried daughters' nuclear families. The Mescalero also practiced matrilocal residence patterns. When a woman married, the couple would move into a new tipi or wickiup close to her parents' home.

== Origin of name ==
The Mescalero's autonym, or name for themselves, is Shis-Inday ("People of the Mountain Forests") or Mashgaléńde / Mashgaléneí ("People close to the mountains" or "Mescalero Apache People"). The Navajo (in Mescalero: ’Indaa’bixúńde / ’Indabixúńde, modern name: Chusht’a ’íízhańde), another Athabascan-speaking tribe, call the Mescalero Naashgalí Dineʼé. Like other Apache peoples they often identify simply as Ndé / Nndéí / Ndéne / Ndéńde ("The People", "Apaches"). Neighboring Apache bands called the Mescalero Nadahéndé ("People of the Mescal"), because the mescal agave (Agave parryi) (Apache: naa’da / ’inaa’da / na’da) was a staple food source for them. In times of need and hunger, they depended on stored mescal for survival. They adopted and identify today also as Naa'dahéńdé / Naa’dańde ("The People of the Mescal"). Since 1550 Spanish colonists referred to them as the Mescalero.

Mescalero Apache bands were often referred to by European colonists and settlers by different names, some related to their geographic territory. They were recorded in documents by a wide number of names: Apaches de Cuartelejo, Apaches del Río Grande, Apachi, Faraones, Mezcaleros, Natage (more correctly, one of the Lipan Apache subdivisions, along with the Nahizan), Natahene, Querechos, Teyas, Tularosa Apaches, and Vaqueros. They were also distinguished as Sierra Blanca Apaches, Sacramento Mountains Apaches, Guadalupe Mountains Apaches, Limpia Mountains Apaches. according to their homelands in northern or southern Mescalero territory.

== Tribal territory ==
Originally the different Mescalero bands and local groups ranged in an area between the Rio Grande (Tú 'ichii-dí – "the water that is the color of red ocher") in the west and the eastern and southern edge of the Llano Estacado and the southern Texas Panhandle in Texas in the east; from present-day Santa Fe (Yuutu') in the northwest and the Texas Panhandle in the northeast, down to the Big Bend of Texas and what became the Mexican provinces of Chihuahua and Coahuila to the south. The diverse landscape of this area has high mountains up to 12,000 feet, as well as watered and sheltered valleys, surrounded by arid semi-deserts and deserts, deep canyons and open plains. The Mescalero Apache Reservation is located at geographical coordinates 33°10′42″N 105°36′44″W. Mescalero identity is filled with legends of the past. For instance, four mountains represent the direction of everyday life for the Mescalero Apache people: those being (1) Sierra Blanca Peak (White Peak), (2) El Capitan within the Guadalupe Mountains, (3) Three Sisters Mountain (Las Tres Hermanas) and (4) Oscura Mountain Peak (sometimes the Salinas Peak within the San Andres Mountains is listed as the fourth sacred mountain instead of the Oscuru Mountain Peak). Moreover, their forefathers spoke of a creator giving them life on White Mountain. It was there that White Painted Woman gave birth to two sons, Child of Water and Killer of Enemies

Since each band of Mescalero had the right to use the resources of deer and plants of the neighboring groups, the different bands felt at home in any area of their wide tribal territory. The Mescalero or Mashgalé-õde bands often ranged widely for hunting, gathering, warring and raiding. They called their home Indeislun Nakah ("people, forming a group, when they are there," "place where people get together") or today Mashgalé-ne bikéyaa ("Mescalero Apache Country"; "Mescalero Apache Homelands"). When many Mescalero bands were displaced by the enemy Comanche ('Indaa tse'-éõde or Indassene; modern name: Gumáõchí-í) from the Southern Plains in northern and central Texas between 1700 and 1750, they took refuge in the mountains of New Mexico, western Texas, and Coahuila and Chihuahua in Mexico. Some southern Mescalero bands, together with Lipan, lived in the Bolsón de Mapimí, moving between the Nazas River, the Conchos River and the Rio Grande to the north.

== Bands ==
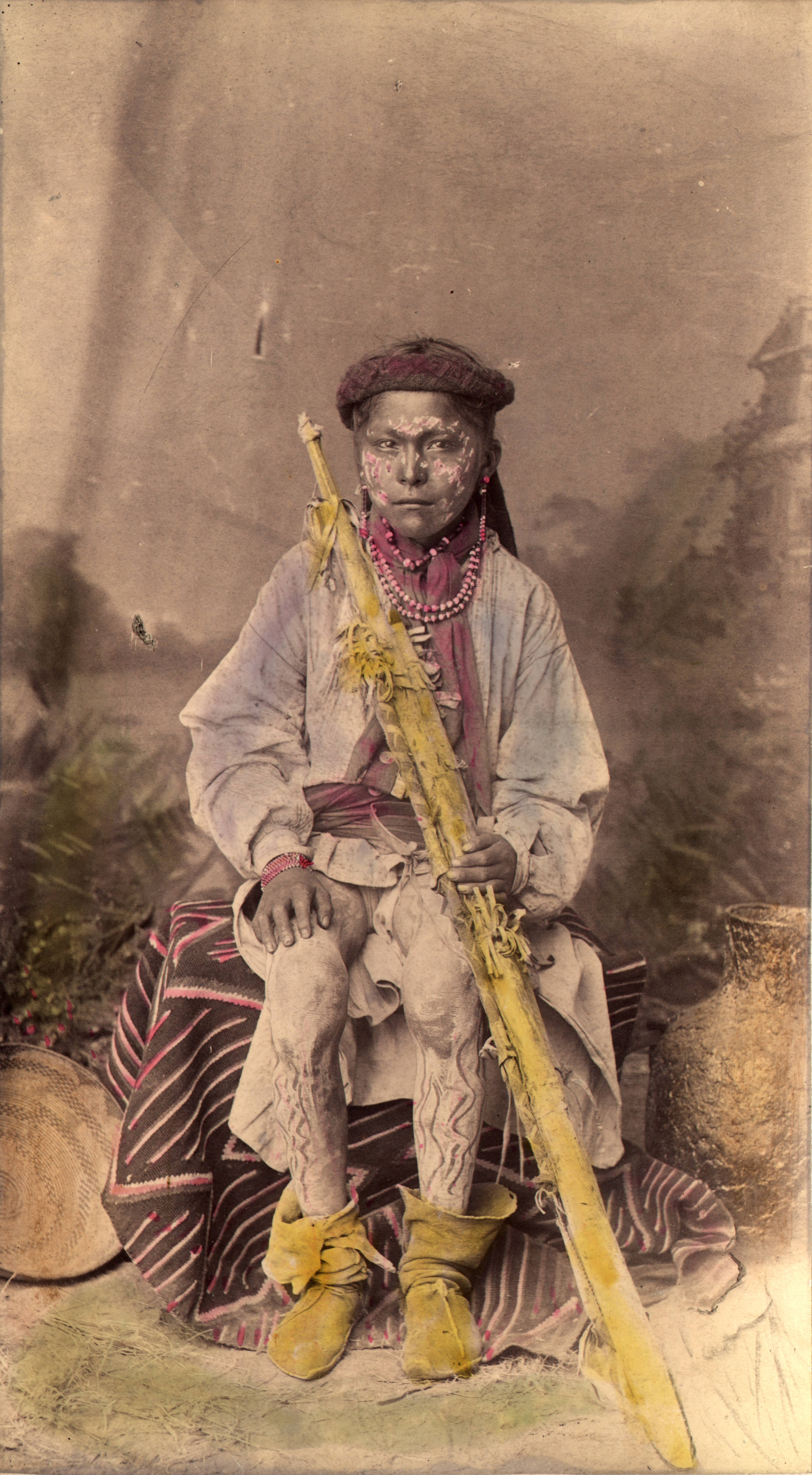
Mescalero painted boy; photo entitled Long Walk of the Navajo. After being defeated by United States military forces, most of the Navajo were marched over 350-mile (560 km) during the winter of 1864 and incarcerated at Bosque Redondo, New Mexico with the Mescalero Apache.

The Mescalero were divided into some regional bands, which were known to the Spanish/Mexican ('indantûhé-õde) and later Americans ('indaa łiga-ńne bindáa-í datł'ij-í – "white [enemy] people with blue eyes" or 'indáá-ńne – "white people"; "[white] enemies"; modern name: nndé bindáa datł'ijé-ńne – "white people"; lit. "blue-eyed people") by different names (most were transliterations or renderings of the bands Apache name).

- Naa’dańde / Naa’dahéńdé ("Mescal People", "People of the Mescal") or Natagés (Spanish rendering and transliteration, pronounced Na-ta-hay); really a Lipan group, they lived between the Rio Grande and the Pecos River (also known as the Rio Salado or Rio del Natagee) in central New Mexico, with several local groups traveling on the southern and western edge of the Llano Estacado onto the southern Texas Panhandle, original Apachean group who would become the Mescalero and Salinero Apaches ("Salt producing People").)
- Gułgahéńde / Gułgańde ("People of the Plains", "The People of Open Spaces") or Cuelcajenne, later Llañeros ("Plains People"; really a Jicarilla group, they lived east of the mountains and the Pecos River, on the High Plains from the Texas Panhandle to the Pecos Valley, between Amarillo (Bighą́ą́’ gułga-yá / Bighą́ą́’ gułtsúú-yá), Tucumcari, Lubbock and the Llano Estacado, along the Sandia and Tijeras Mountains westward to Santa Fe, from Nogal Canyon to the north to Las Vegas, from the Organ Mountains (Tsé daadeezhá-yá; Tsé deezhá-yá – "The place where rocks are jagged") eastwards to El Paso (Tsé táhúú'á-yá) in Texas (Ch'a nteeã-õde bikéé'yaa'). In Oklahoma (Indian Territory) they developed kinship ties by marriage with the Comanche.)
- Dził-í naańde / Dził-í naahńde ("Mountain Ridge Band People", "The People of the Mountainside", "The People who Live on the Edge of the Mountains") or Chilpaines (lived in the mountains west and south of the Pecos River, extending in northern Chihuahua and Coahuila of present-day Mexico.)
- Ch’ilaańde / Jilaa’éńde ("Antelope Band People", "The People of Antelope") (lived west of the Pecos west to the Rio Grande in the mountains of central and south New Mexico and the Tularosa Basin (Tséts’ųųsí yaneeł’ą́’-ee tú nk’ų́jí siką́-yá).
- Nii’t’ahéńde / Niit’ahéńde ("The People of the Side of the Land", "The People at the Side of the Earth", "The People at the Edge of the Earth", "People Who Live Against the Mountains", "Earth Crevine (Deer) People") or Sierra Blanca (White Mountains) Mescaleros, sometimes Sacramento Mountains Mescaleros (so named because their 19th century dominant local groups lived in the Sacramento Mountains and in the Sierra Blanca (White Mountains) (Dził Gais ’ą́ní) in New Mexico with other local groups living east in the Guadalupe Mountains of western Texas.)
- Tséichíńde ("People of Hook Nose", "The People of Red Rock", "The People of the Guadalupe Mountains") or Guadalupe Mountains Mescaleros (several bands, who lived in the Tséichí ("red rock", i.e. Guadalupe Mountains), the adjacent Plains of Texas and in northern Coahuila and Chihuahua of Mexico.)
- Tsébikįnéńde ("Rock House People", "Stone House People", "The People of Rock Houses"), Aguas Nuevas Apaches or Norteños ("The Northerners"), later Limpia Mescaleros (have been based around the Nuevo Casas Grandes in Chihuahua, migrating north toward the Sacramento Mountains and south to Agua Nueva 60 miles north of Chihuahua City (Ją́’é łą́yá- "the place where (there are) many donkeys"), also on both sides of the Rio Grande between El Paso and Ojinaga, Chihuahua; some local groups lived in the Guadalupe and Limpia mountains)
- Tahuundé / Tá'huú'ndé ("Mountains Extending into the River People") (lived on both sides of the Pecos River in southern New Mexico and into southwestern Texas)
- Chisos Apaches / Chishéńde / Chishhéńde ("Forest People"), Chinati Apaches ("People at the mountain pass") or Rio Grande Apaches (one mighty band with several local groups living in the Chihuahuan Desert and arid mountains ranging on both sides of the Rio Grande from the Trans-Pecos south down into the Sierra Madre Oriental of North Mexico, with strongholds in the mountain ranges of the Davis Mountains (former Limpia Mountains), Chisos Mountains and Chinati Mountains (from Apache name ch'íná'itíh – "gate" or "mountain pass") of West Texas and in the adjoining Sierra del Burro (Serranias del Burro), Sierra (Maderas) del Carmen of Coahuila and Sierra Alamos of Chihuahua north of the Bolsón de Mapimí, today's Big Bend National Park in Texas and the Cañón de Santa Elena Protected Area and Maderas del Carmen Protected Area are part of their former band territory.)
- Túntsańde / Tú ntsaa-ńde ("Big Water People") (once the Tú sis Ndé band of the Lipan Apache, who lived in south central Texas and in northern Coahuila, camping together with several bands of the Mescalero on the Plains for hunting and raiding; they merged with the Mescalero, forming a Mescalero band)
- Tú’édįnéńde ("No Water People", "Tough People of the Desert") (once the Tú é diné Ndé band of the Lipan Apache, who had territory in northern Coahuila and Chihuahua; they eventually merged with some southern Mescalero bands)

The Naa’dahéńdé had had a considerable influence on the decision-making of some bands of the Western Lipan in the 18th century, especially on the Tindi Ndé, Tcha shka-ózhäye, Tú’édįnéńde and Tú sis Ndé. To fight their common enemy, the Comanche, and to protect the northeastern and eastern border of the Apacheria against the Comancheria, the Mescalero (Naa’dahéńdé and Gułgahéńde) on the Plains joined forces with their Lipan kin (Cuelcahen Ndé, Te'l kóndahä, Ndáwe qóhä and Shá’i’áńde) to the east and south of them.

In August 1912, by an act of the U.S. Congress, the surviving members of the Chiricahua tribe were released from their prisoner-of-war status. They were given the choice to remain at Fort Sill, Oklahoma, where they had been imprisoned since 1894, or to relocate to the Mescalero Apache reservation. One hundred and eighty-three elected to go to New Mexico, while seventy-eight remained in Oklahoma. Their descendants still reside in both places.

== Notable Mescalero ==
=== Historical chiefs and headmen ===
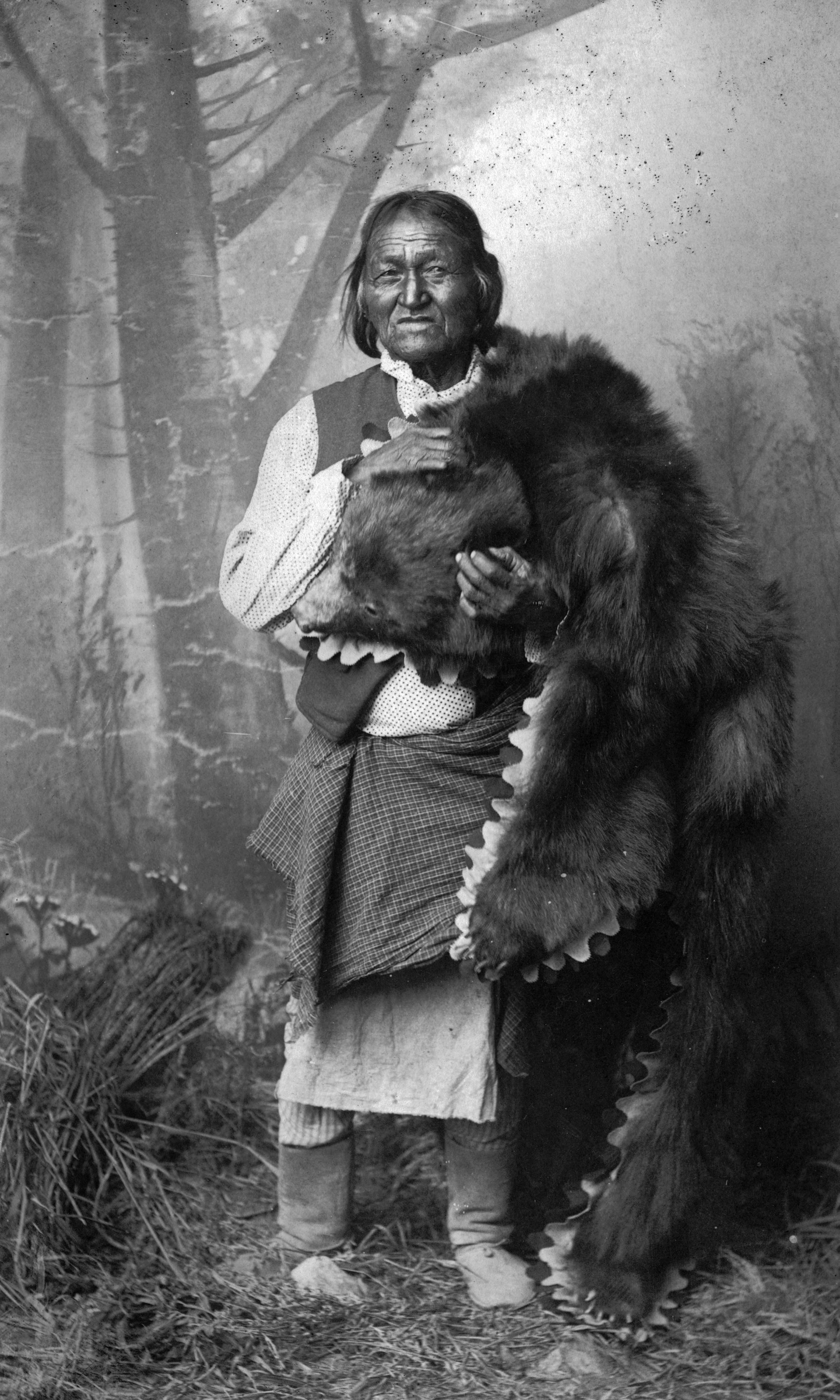
Gorgonia, Sierrablanca Mescalero medicine man

Northern Mescalero

- Barranquito (also known as Palanquito): most influential chief of the Nii’t’ahéńde (Sierra Blanca Mescalero) band, which ranged between the Sierra Blanca east toward the Pecos River, probably the most important Mescalero chief in the early 1800s, when he died in 1857, his three sons and/or nephews Santana, Cadete and Roman succeeded him.
- Santana (also known as Santa Ana, ca. 1810 / 1815 – †1876): son and successor of Barranquito, since about 1830' had been a local group leader of great authority of the Sierra Blanca Mescalero band, since the death of Barranquito Santana seem to have had the most influence within the northern Mescalero bands, but avoided the spotlight and was hardly known by the whites, in his later years he became the most steadfast friend of the whites, until his death of pneumonia or smallpox.
- Cadete (also known as Cadette – "Volunteer", in Apache: Gian-na-tah – "Always Ready", also known as Zhee-es-not-son, Zhee Ah Nat Tsa): a son and successor of Barranquito, after Santana he was the most prominent and powerful chief of the Sierra Blanca Mescalero band, was more diplomatic than Santana and was a spokesman for the northern Mescalero bands. After the outbreak from Bosque Redondo on November 3, 1863, he had fled with his band toward the Staked Plains, trading stolen cattle and horses from Mexico directly or via the Comanchero to Comanche. He was murdered in 1872 while on a peace mission and returning from Tularosa.
- Roman Grande: a son and successor of Barranquito, serving as chief of a local group of the Sierra Blanca Mescalero band. Less important than Santana and Cadete, he followed the lead of his brother Santana; died during an epidemic in 1885.
- Josecito (also known as José Cito): after Barranquito and Santana, the most prominent leader of some local groups of the Sierra Blanca Mescalero band. In April 1852 he signed a treaty with Calhoun representing the US, together with the minor leader of another group of the Sierra Blanca Mescalero and Chacon, leader of the Jicarilla Apache.
- San Juan: chief of the Nii’t’ahéńde (Sacramento Mountains Mescaleros) band, his band ranged along the Rio Bonito, Rio Hondo and in the Capitan Mountains with the Sacramento Mountains—the area where Fort Stanton was built—had alliances with eastern Mescalero bands, Lipan Apache bands as well as some Comanche bands; after Santana and Cadete were gone, chief San Juan and Nautzili took over the leadership of the Mescaleros on the reservation, but, unlike Nautzili, San Juan left the reservation in spring 1880, after Caballero's outbreak, during "Victorio's war"; his son Peso would become the last Mescalero chief.
- Caballero (Ca-bal-le-so, eventually to be identified with Kutbhalla or Kutu-hala): war chief and later principal chief of the Nii’t’ahéńde (Sacramento Mountains Mescaleros) local groups of the Sacramento Mountains during the decades 1860s and 1870s, likely married to a daughter of the Chihenne Chief Mangas Coloradas, close ally and long-time friend of the great Mimbreño chief Victorio (and likely his brother-in-law as Mangas Coloradas' son-in-law); in March 1880 he left Tularosa and joined Victorio, fighting along with him in their last battles, but, according to some reports, he was killed in a trouble between the chiefs before the Tres Castillos massacre on oct. 14 1880.
- Peso: ca. *1849 – †1929, was born in the Guadalupe Mountains near present-day Carlsbad as son of chief San Juan and his wife Nagoo-nah-go, his Nii’t’ahéńde or maybe Tséichíńde (Guadalupe Mountains Mescaleros) band joined Nautzili's band of Guhlkahéndé on the Southern Plains, from time to time he also joined the Tu'sis Nde band of Lipan Apaches of southeastern Texas and northeastern Mexico under Chief Magoosh, he was an expert tracker and served as Apache Scout in the campaigns against Geronimo, in the late 1800s he, together with his brother Sin Miedo (Sans Peur, Without Fear) and Magoosh were the three primary leaders on the reservation—Magoosh for the Lipans at Elk Springs, Sin Miedo at Tule Canyon and Peso representing the Rinconada and the Three Rivers.
- Sin Miedo ("Without Fear" = "Sans Peur"): brother of chief Peso and son of chief San Juan, his Nii’t’ahéńde or maybe Tséichíńde (Guadalupe Mountains Mescaleros) band were close allies of the eastern Mescalero band named Gułgahéńde on the Southern Plains and of the Túsis Nde band of Lipan Apaches of southeastern Texas and northeastern Mexico; together with his brothers Peso, Crook Neck, and leaders as Shanta Boy and Big Mouth he served as Apache Scout in the campaign against Geronimo, the war leader and shaman of the Bedonkohe band of the Ndendhe Apaches; he, together with his brother Peso and Magoosh were the three primary leaders on the reservation—Magoosh for the Lipans at Elk Springs, Peso representing the Rinconada and the Three Rivers, and Sin Miedo at Tule Canyon.
- Muchacho Negro ("Black Boy", born ca. 1860, died 1930): important local group leader and war chief, joined the Chihenne Chief Victorio, because of taking part in Victorio's War he was transferred to Fort Union (where he was to be imprisoned), but he escaped early in August 1882. Muchacho Negro was considered a renegade who would return to his people and continue to cause trouble. He was captured in June 1883 and imprisoned at Fort Sill, Indian Territory.
- Gorgonio: medicine-man, aide to old Barranquito and, later, to Santana.

Southern Mescalero

- Carnoviste: chief of Tsehitcihéndé (Guadalupe Mountains Mescaleros) or maybe Tsebekinéndé (Aguas Nuevas Apaches or Limpia Mescaleros), his band lived in the Big Bend Country, ranged on both sides of the Rio Grande from the Guadalupe Mountains towards east of the Limpia Mountains also known as Davis Mountains onto the edge of the Southern Plains, was reported to have committed frequent "depredations" on the San Antonio road and to have kidnapped Hermann—soon adopted in the tribe—and Willie Lehmann near Fort Mason in May 1870; in 1874 he promoted a council of Mescalero, Mimbreño and Lipan Apache chiefs, and Victorio succeeded in persuading the council to send peace messengers to the Comanches and Kiowas; he was killed by a medicine man of his band in the spring 1876.
- Gómez (also known as Chief Gómez or Juan Gómez or by the Apache Negoyani, "Old Man of Wisdom"): chief of the 1840s–1860s who led a large Tsebekinéndé (Aguas Nuevas Apaches or Limpia Mescaleros) band of five local groups with about 400 warriors. His band lived in the Big Bend Country and the Trans-Pecos on both sides of the Rio Grande; his stronghold was in the Limpia Mountains, later named Davis Mountains. When the governor of Chihuahua Ángel Trías Álvarez offered 1000 pesos for his scalp, Gómez offered an equal amount for any Mexican or American scalp. The Glanton Gang's quest to capture Gómez on behalf of Gov. Trías was dramatized by Cormac McCarthy in his 1985 novel Blood Meridian. Gómez's lieutenants (Spanish: segundos) were Cigarito, Chinonero or Chino Huero, Simón Porode, and Simón Manuel.
  - Cigarito: leader of a local group in the Limpia also known as Davis Mountains and in the lowlands of the Trans-Pecos; segundo and war chief of southern Mescalero Chief Gómez, 1840s–1860s
  - Chinonero: leader of a local group in the Limpia also known as Davis Mountains and in the lowlands of the Trans-Pecos; segundo and war chief of southern Mescalero chief Gómez, 1840s–1860s
  - Simón Porode: leader of a local group in West Texas; segundo and war chief of southern Mescalero chief Gómez. In 1850 he and Simón Manuel contacted the garrison at San Elizario to sue for peace, but were likely overruled by Gómez, 1840s–1860s.
  - Simón Manuel: leader of a local group in West Texas; segundo and war chief of southern Mescalero chief Gómez. In 1850 he and Simón Porode contacted the garrison at San Elizario to sue for peace, but were likely overruled by Gómez, 1840s–1860s)
- Marco (also known as Marcus): chief of about 600 Tsehitcihéndé (Guadalupe Mountains Mescaleros) or maybe Niit'a-héõde, including about 200 warriors. They lived in the Big Bend Country, ranged on both sides of the Rio Grande from the Guadalupe Mountains (Tsé'íchîî') toward east of the Limpia Mountains also known as Davis Mountains onto the edge of the Southern Plains. He was reported to have led frequent raids and attacks of parties on the San Antonio road and in the settlement near El Paso. He wished to join the Sierra Blanca Mescalero band, but their request was refused, because they were considered a Texas Mescalero band; active in the 1840s–1860s.
- Espejo ("looking-glass"): chief of a large band of Tsebekinéndé (Aguas Nuevas Apaches or Limpia Mescaleros) with several local groups under his segundos (or war chiefs) Nicolás and Antonio. They ranged between Limpia Canyon, Horsehead Crossing on the Pecos and east of the Limpia also known as Davis Mountains onto the surrounding desert lowlands of the Trans-Pecos in West Texas, from the 1840s to the late 1860s.
  - Nicolás: leader of a local group of the Tsebekinéndé band in the Limpia also known as Davis Mountains and east onto the edge of the Southern Plains, segundo and war chief of southern Mescalero chief Espejo, 1840s–1860s.
  - Antonio: leader of a local group of the Tsebekinéndé band in the Limpia also known as Davis Mountains and east onto the edge of the Southern Plains, segundo and war chief of southern Mescalero chief Espejo, 1840s–1860s.
- Mateo: leader of a local group of the Tsebekinéndé (often called by Spanish and Americans Aguas Nuevas or Norteños), stayed together with Verancia in the vicinity of Dog Canyon in the Sacramento Mountains and presumably followed the old ways of hunt and raid, since they were considered "troublesome.", 1840s–1860s.
- Verancia: said to be a son of Gomez, leader of a local group of the Tsebekinéndé, stayed together with Mateo in the vicinity of Dog Canyon in the Sacramento Mountains and presumably followed the old ways of hunt and raid, since they were considered "troublesome.", 1840s–1860s.
- Alsate (also known as Arzate, Arzatti, also known as Pedro Muzquiz, ca. *1820 – †1881/1882): last chief of the Chisos Apaches (also Chinati or Rio Grande Apaches), this band ranged in the Limpia Mountains (or Davis Mountains), Chisos Mountains and Chinati Mountains in the Big Bend area, the Sierra del Carmen of Coahuila and Sierra Alamos in Chihuahua north of the Bolsón de Mapimí, born to a Mescalero woman and a member by blood of the influential Muzquiz family, captured with his band in 1878 at San Carlos de Chihuahua and deported to Mexico City to be jailed in "la Acordada", succeeded in escaping with his people in December 1879 and came back to the Big Bend; was caught again at San Carlos de Chihuahua in 1880 and executed together with his segundos (or war chiefs) Colorado and Zorillo at Ojinaga, opposite Presidio del Norte, Texas, his people were sold into slavery in Mexico, ca. 1860 – 1882.
  - Colorado ("Red", likely "Avispa Colorada" "Red Wasp"): leader of a local group of Chisos, or maybe Lipan, Apaches in the border region of Coahuila, Chihuahua and West Texas, segundo and war chief of the Chisos Mescalero chief Alsate, was caught and executed together with Alsate and Zorillo at Ojinaga, opposite Presidio del Norte, Texas, late 1860s – 1882.
  - Zorillo (likely "Zorrillo" "Little Fox"): leader of a local group of Chisos Apaches in the border region of Coahuila, Chihuahua and West Texas, segundo and war chief of the Chisos Mescalero chief Alsate, was caught and executed together with Alsate and Colorado at Ojinaga, opposite Presidio del Norte, Texas, late 1860s – 1882.

Eastern Mescalero / Plains Mescalero

- Nautzili (also known as Natzili, Nautzile, Nodzilla, Nalt'zilli or Nut Cilli – "buffalo"): chief of the Guhlkahéndé (Llañeros) band and southern Lipan splinter groups living in northern Mexico, moved to reservation in 1876. In 1879 he had assumed leadership of most of the Mescalero reservation bands (including the Lipan) and persuaded many warriors not to join the Tchihende chief Victorio in Victorio's War.

=== Other notable Mescalero ===
- Gouyen (ca. 1857 – 1903), female warrior
- Wendell Chino, former tribal president of the Mescalero Apache Tribe for 43 years
- Virginia Klinekole, first female tribal president
- Sara Misquez, former tribal president
- Dr. Felicia Fontenot, DDS, the first Mescalero Apache Dentist
- George Aguilar, actor
- Israel Vázquez, Boxer

== Education ==
Mescalero Apache Schools is the tribal school.

== See also ==
- Lincoln National Forest
- List of Indian reservations in the United States
- Mescalero, New Mexico
- Mescalero language
- Winnetou
- Mescalero Escarpment

== Bibliography ==
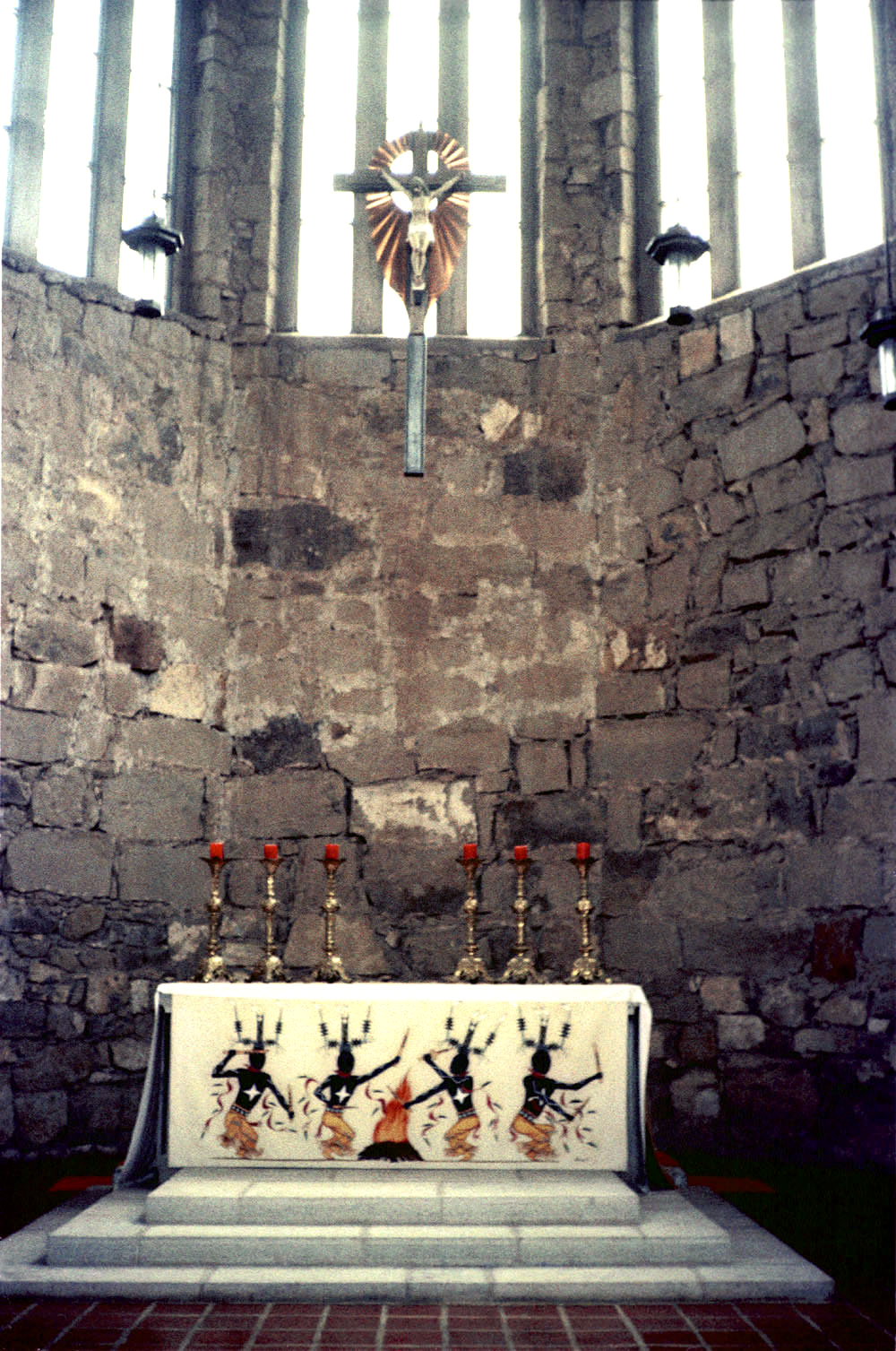
St. Joseph's Catholic Church, Mescalero, New Mexico ca. 1975 Mountain Spirit Dancers painted on altar

- Casteter, Edward F.; & Opler, Morris E. (1936). The ethnobiology of the Chiricahua and Mescalero Apache: The use of plants for foods, beverages and narcotics. Ethnobiological studies in the American Southwest, (Vol. 3); Biological series (Vol. 4, No. 5); Bulletin, University of New Mexico, whole, (No. 297). Albuquerque: University of New Mexico Press.
- Debo, Angie, Geronimo: The Man, His Time, His Place, Norman, OK: University of Oklahoma Press (1976), ISBN 0-8061-1828-8
- Hoijer, Harry; & Opler, Morris E. (1938). Chiricahua and Mescalero Apache texts. The University of Chicago publications in anthropology; Linguistic series. Chicago: University of Chicago Press. (Reprinted 1964 by Chicago: University of Chicago Press; in 1970 by Chicago: University of Chicago Press; & in 1980 under H. Hoijer by New York: AMS Press, ISBN 0-404-15783-1).
- Opler, Morris E. (1933). An analysis of Mescalero and Chiricahua Apache social organization in the light of their systems of relationship. Unpublished doctoral dissertation, University of Chicago.
- Opler, Morris E. (1935). The concept of supernatural power among the Chiricahua and Mescalero Apaches. American Anthropologist, 37 (1), 65–70.
- Opler, Morris E. (1936). The kinship systems of the Southern Athabaskan-speaking tribes. American Anthropologist, 38 (4), 620–633.
- Sonnichsen, C. L. (1972) The Mescalero Apaches (The Civilization of the American Indian Series), Norman, OK: University of Oklahoma Press (1972), ISBN 0-8061-1615-3
- Seymour, Deni J. (2002) Conquest and Concealment: After the El Paso Phase on Fort Bliss. Conservation Division, Directorate of Environment, Fort Bliss. Lone Mountain Report 525/528. This document can be obtained by contacting belinda.mollard@us.army.mil.
- Seymour, Deni J. (2003) Protohistoric and Early Historic Temporal Resolution. Conservation Division, Directorate of Environment, Fort Bliss. Lone Mountain Report 560–003. This document can be obtained by contacting belinda.mollard@us.army.mil.
- Seymour, Deni J. (2003) The Cerro Rojo Complex: A Unique Indigenous Assemblage in the El Paso Area and Its Implications For The Early Apache. Proceedings of the XII Jornada Mogollon Conference in 2001. Geo-Marine, El Paso.
- Seymour, Deni J. (2004) A Ranchería in the Gran Apachería: Evidence of Intercultural Interaction at the Cerro Rojo Site. Plains Anthropologist 49(190):153-192.
- Seymour, Deni J. (2004) Before the Spanish Chronicles: Early Apache in the Southern Southwest, pp. 120 –142. In "Ancient and Historic Lifeways in North America’s Rocky Mountains." Proceedings of the 2003 Rocky Mountain Anthropological Conference, Estes Park, Colorado, edited by Robert H. Brunswig and William B. Butler. Department of Anthropology, University of Northern Colorado, Greeley.
- Seymour, Deni J. (2007) Sexually Based War Crimes or Structured Conflict Strategies: An Archaeological Example from the American Southwest. In Texas and Points West: Papers in Honor of John A. Hedrick and Carol P. Hedrick, edited by Regge N. Wiseman, Thomas C. O’Laughlin, and Cordelia T. Snow, pp. 117–134. Papers of the Archaeological Society of New Mexico No. 33. Archaeological Society of New Mexico, Albuquerque.
- Seymour, Deni J. (2007) Apache, Spanish, and Protohistoric Archaeology on Fort Bliss. Conservation Division, Directorate of Environment, Fort Bliss. Lone Mountain Report 560–005. With Tim Church
- Seymour, Deni J. (2007) An Archaeological Perspective on the Hohokam-Pima Continuum. Old Pueblo Archaeology Bulletin No. 51 (December 2007):1-7. (This discusses the early presence of Athapaskans.)
- Seymour, Deni J. (2008) Despoblado or Athapaskan Heartland: A Methodological Perspective on Ancestral Apache Landscape Use in the Safford Area. Chapter 5 in Crossroads of the Southwest: Culture, Ethnicity, and Migration in Arizona's Safford Basin, pp. 121–162, edited by David E. Purcell, Cambridge Scholars Press, New York.
- Seymour, Deni J. (2008) A Pledge of Peace: Evidence of the Cochise-Howard Treaty Campsite. Historical Archaeology 42(4):154-179. With George Robertson.
- Seymour, Deni J. (2008) Apache Plain and Other Plainwares on Apache Sites in the Southern Southwest. In "Serendipity: Papers in Honor of Frances Joan Mathien," edited by R.N. Wiseman, T.C O'Laughlin, C.T. Snow and C. Travis, pp 163–186. Papers of the Archaeological Society of New Mexico No. 34. Archaeological Society of New Mexico, Albuquerque.
- Seymour, Deni J. (2008) Surfing Behind The Wave: A Counterpoint Discussion Relating To "A Ranchería In the Gran Apachería." Plains Anthropologist 53(206):241-262.
- Seymour, Deni J. (2008) Pre-Differentiation Athapaskans (Proto-Apache) in the 13th and 14th Century Southern Southwest. Chapter in edited volume under preparation. Also paper in the symposium: The Earliest Athapaskans in Southern Southwest: Implications for Migration, organized and chaired by Deni Seymour, Society for American Archaeology, Vancouver.
- Seymour, Deni J. (2009) Evaluating Eyewitness Accounts of Native Peoples along the Coronado Trail from the International Border to Cibola. New Mexico Historical Review 84(3):399-435.
- Seymour, Deni J. (2009) Distinctive Places, Suitable Spaces: Conceptualizing Mobile Group Occupational Duration and Landscape Use. International Journal of Historical Archaeology 13(3): 255–281.
- Seymour, Deni J. (2009) Nineteenth-Century Apache Wickiups: Historically Documented Models for Archaeological Signatures of the Dwellings of Mobile People. Antiquity 83(319):157-164.
- Seymour, Deni J. (2009) Comments On Genetic Data Relating to Athapaskan Migrations: Implications of the Malhi et al. Study for the Apache and Navajo. American Journal of Physical Anthropology 139(3):281-283.
- Seymour, Deni J. (2009) The Cerro Rojo Site (LA 37188)--A Large Mountain-Top Ancestral Apache Site in Southern New Mexico. Digital History Project. New Mexico Office of the State Historian. https://www.newmexicohistory.org/ Select: Place, Communities, Click on 'Cerro Rojo' on the map (orange square-dot NE of EL Paso, East of Las Cruces and Dona Ana ).
- Seymour, Deni J. (2010) Cycles Of Renewal, Transportable Assets: Aspects of the Ancestral Apache Housing Landscape. Accepted at Plains Anthropologist.
- Seymour, Deni J. (2010) Contextual Incongruities, Statistical Outliers, and Anomalies: Targeting Inconspicuous Occupational Events. American Antiquity. (Winter, in press)
- Scott, Richard B. (1959-05-18). Acculturation Among Mescalero Apache High School Students. University of New Mexico. - Profile - Master's degree thesis
