= Victorio =

Apache leader

- Bidu-ya, Beduiat
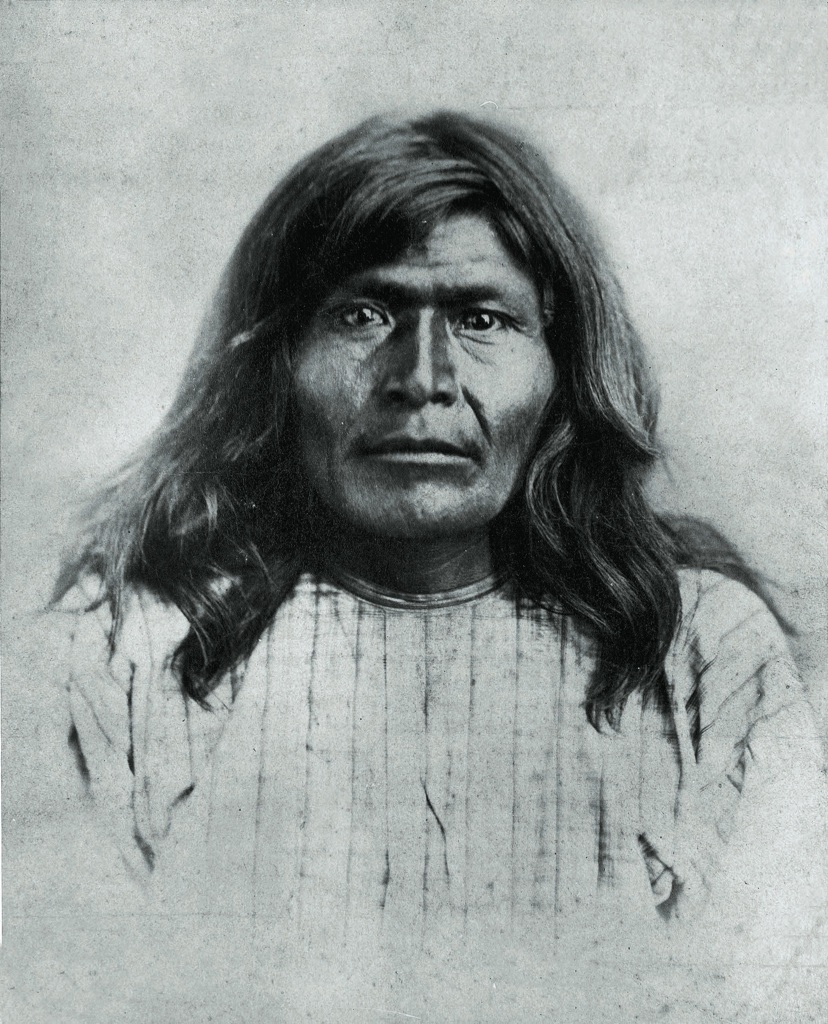
- Victorio

Tchihende Apache leader
- Preceded by: Cuchillo Negro (Warm Springs Tchihende), Mangas Coloradas (Coppermine Tchihende)
- Succeeded by: Nana

Personal details
- Born: c. 1825 Chihuahua, First Mexican Republic
- Died: October 14, 1880 (aged 55) Tres Castillos, Chihuahua, Mexico
- Cause of death: Killed by Mexican soldiers during the Battle of Tres Castillos
- Resting place: Doña Ana County, New Mexico, United States
- Relations: Lozen (sister)
- Mother tongue: Chiricahua
- Nicknames: He who checks his horse; Apache Wolf

Military service
- Battles/wars: Apache Pass, Percha River, San Mateos Mountains, Animas Creek, Alma Massacre, Fort Tularosa, Aleman's Wells, Hembrillo Canyon, Quitman Canyon, Tres Castillos

Victorio (Bidu-ya, Beduiat; ca. 1825–October 14, 1880) was a warrior and chief of the Warm Springs band of the Tchihendeh (or Chihenne, often called Mimbreño) division of the central Apaches in what is now the American states of Texas, New Mexico, Arizona, and the Mexican states of Sonora and Chihuahua.

In Victorio's War from September 1879 to October 1880, Victorio led a band of Apaches, never numbering more than 200 men, in a running battle with the U.S. and Mexican armies and the civilian population of New Mexico, Texas, and northern Mexico, fighting two dozen skirmishes and battles. He and most of his followers were killed or captured by the Mexican army in the Battle of Tres Castillos in October 1880.

== Early life ==
Victorio was born around the year 1825 near the Hacienda Encinillas, Chihuahua City (Ją’éłąyá), Mexico and its believed he was baptized with the name of "Pedro Cedillo", on his early childhood he was taken from the hacienda by the Chihenne band during a raid to the site and he was raised as a warrior, then he received the name "Biduya".

Victorio grew up in the Chihenne band. There is speculation that he or his band had Navajo kinship ties and was known among the Navajo as "He Who Checks His Horse". Victorio's sister was the famous woman warrior Lozen, or the "Dextrous Horse Thief".

== Tchihendeh chief ==
In 1853 he was considered a chief or sub-chief by the United States Army and signed a document. In his twenties, he rode with Mangas Coloradas, leader of the Coppermine band of the Tchihendeh people and principal leader of the whole Tchihendeh Apache division (who took him as his son-in-law), and Cuchillo Negro, leader of the Warm Springs band of the Tchihendeh people and second principal leader of the whole Tchihendeh Apache division, as well as did Nana, Delgadito, Cochise, Juh, Geronimo and other Apache leaders. Mangas Coloradas taught Victorio how to create an ambush and to wait for enemies to enter the killing zone. As was the custom, he became the leader of a large mixed band of Mimbreños and Mescaleros (led by his friend – and probably brother-in-law as the husband of another daughter of Mangas Coloradas, as well the same Cochise – Caballero) and fought against the United States Army.

From 1870 to 1880, Victorio, chief of the Coppermine Mimbreños and principal leader of all the Tchihende, along with Loco, chief of the Warm Spring Mimbreños and second-ranking among the Tchihende, were moved to and left at least three different reservations, some more than once, despite their bands' request to live on traditional lands. Victorio, Loco, and the Mimbreños were moved to San Carlos Reservation in Arizona Territory in 1877.

== Victorio's War ==
Victorio and his followers (including Nana, Nana's Mescalero wife, and San Juan) left the reservation twice, seeking and temporarily obtaining hospitality in Fort Stanton Reservation among their Sierra Blanca and Sacramento Mescalero allies, before they came back to Ojo Caliente only to leave permanently in late August 1879, which started Victorio's War. Despite Nautzili's efforts, many Northern Mescalero warriors, led by Caballero and Muchacho Negro, joined him with their families, and San Juan and other Mescaleros also left their reservation; many Guadalupe and Limpia Mescalero too (Carnoviste and Alsate were close allies to Victorio after 1874) joined Victorio's people. Victorio was successful at raiding and evading capture by the military and won a significant engagement at Las Animas Canyon in what is now the Aldo Leopold Wilderness on September 18, 1879.

Within a few months, Victorio led an impressive series of other fights against troops of the 9th, 10th, and 6th U.S. Cavalry near the Percha River (Rio Puerco) (January 1, 1880), in the San Mateos Mountains (January 17, 1880) and the Cabello Mountains near the Animas Creek (January 30, 1880), and again near Aleman's Wells, San Andres Mountains west of White Sands, (February 2, 1880), then again in the San Andres Mountains (perhaps near Victorio Peak) routing the cavalrymen and chasing them to the Rio Grande (February 9, 1880), then (April 4, 1880) at Hembrillo Canyon, San Andres Mountains. In April 1880, Victorio was credited with leading the Alma Massacre – a raid on United States settlers' homes around Alma, New Mexico. During this event, 41 settlers were killed. Victorio's warriors were finally driven off by the arrival of American soldiers from Fort Bayard. However, Victorio continued his campaign with the attack on Fort Tularosa, where his warriors had to face a detachment (K troop) of the 9th Cavalry and were repulsed by the "Buffalo Soldiers" after a harsh fight. Victorio's camp near the Rio Palomas, in the Black Range, was surprised and attacked on May 23–25, 1880, but the Mimbreños and Mescaleros succeeded in repulsing the soldiers. After the Rio Palomas battle, Victorio went on some raids to Mexico repeatedly fording the Rio Grande, after having been intercepted and beaten off, with a 60 warriors' party, at Quitman Canyon (July 30, 1880). Chased by more than 4,000 armed men (9th, 10th, 6th U.S. Cavalry, 15th U.S. Infantry, Texas Rangers), Victorio evaded all of them for more than a month. On August 9, 1880, Victorio and his band attacked a stagecoach and mortally wounded retired Major General James J. Byrne.

== Last stand and death ==
In October 1880, in north-eastern Chihuahua (a land well known to the Guadalupe and Limpia Southern Mescaleros), having sent Nana and Mangus to raid for food and ammunition, Victorio, with only a few warriors and even less ammunition, and his band were surrounded and killed by soldiers of the Mexican Army under Colonel Joaquín Terrazas in the Battle of Tres Castillos.

An 1886 appendix for Papers Relating to the Foreign Nations of the United States states that, contemporaneously, the Tarahumara scout credited with killing Victorio in 1880 was Mauricio Corredor. The Apache version states that Victorio actually committed suicide with a knife rather than face capture, and historians such as Kathleen Chamberlain note that the Mexicans at the battle could not identify which body was Victorio's.

== Legacy ==
A memorial statue of Victorio riding a horse is located in the city of Chihuahua, Mexico, as a recognition to the N’nee (Chiricahua) and Apache peoples. Victorio Peak was named for him following the Battle of Hembrillo Basin.

=== Media ===
Victorio has been depicted in several films, including;

- Hondo (U.S., 1953) by John Farrow, with Michael Pate as Victorio;
- Fort Bowie (U.S., 1958) by Howard W. Koch with Larry Chance as Victorio;
- Apache Rifles (U.S., 1964) by William Witney with Joseph Vitale as Victorio;
- Hondo (U.S., 1967) by Lee H. Katzin, with Michael Pate as Victorio;
- Buffalo Soldiers (U.S., 1997) by Charles Haid with Harrison Lowe as Victorio.

In the Philippe Morvan's novel, Ours, published in 2018 by Calmann-Lévy, Victorio is an important character of the plot.

In Álvaro Enrigue’s book, Ahora Me Rindo y Eso Es Todo, published in 2018 by Anagrama, Victorio is an important character.
