= Spring Canyon (Alamosa Creek) =

Spring Canyon is a canyon and tributary creek of Alamosa Creek in Socorro County, New Mexico. Its source is at an elevation if 6,850 feet (2,090 meters), in the San Mateo Mountains to the north of Monticello Canyon at 33°35′23″N 107°34′28″W. Its mouth is at an elevation if 6,174 feet (1,882 meters) near its creek's confluence with Alamosa Creek.
