= Nana (chief) =

American Indian Apache Chief

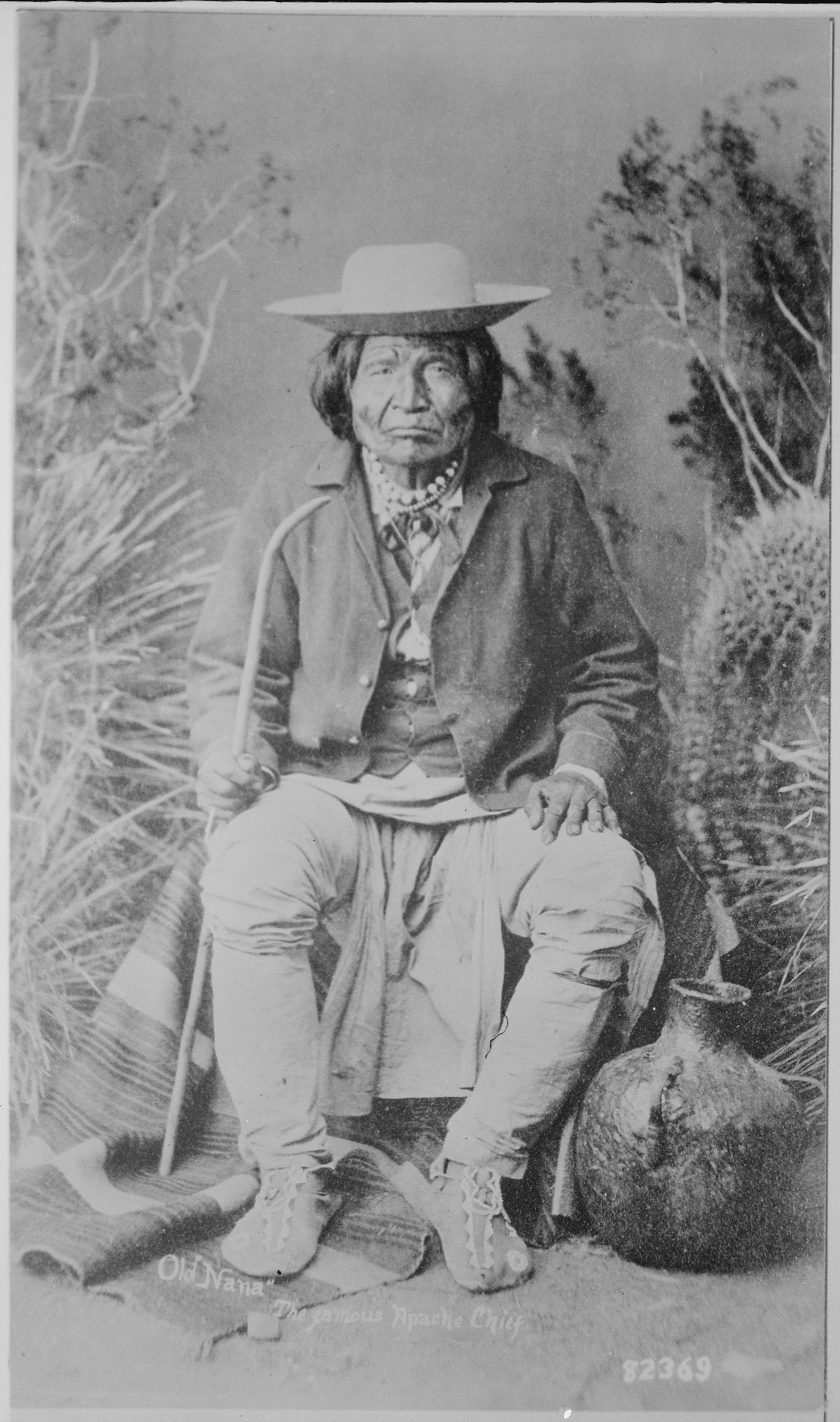
- Nana in 1886

Chiricahua Apache leader

Personal details
- Born: c.1810
- Died: May 19, 1896 (aged 85–86) Fort Sill, Indian Territory
- Cause of death: natural causes
- Nickname(s): Kas-tziden, Haškɛnadɨltla

Kas-tziden ("Broken Foot") or Haškɛnadɨltla ("Angry, He is Agitated"), more widely known by his Mexican-Spanish appellation Nana ("grandma" or "lullaby") (c. 1810 – May 19, 1896), was a warrior and chief of the Chihenne band (better known as Warm Springs Apache) of the Chiricahua Apache. A trusted lieutenant to Cuchillo Negro and Mangas Coloradas, in the 1850s and 1860s he was one of the best known leaders of the Chihenne (Tchiende), along with Tudeevia (Dudeevia, better known as Delgadito - "Little Thin", "Skinny"), Ponce and Loco ("crazy", "mad"). He was a nephew of Delgadito, and married a sister of Geronimo.

== Description ==
Captain John Gregory Bourke described Nana as having "a strong face marked with intelligence, courage and good nature, but with an under stratum of cruelty and vindictiveness". Charles Fletcher Lummis claimed that Nana wore gold watch chains in each ear lobe, presumably taken from dead victims.

== Early fights ==
He fought alongside Mangas Coloradas and his mixed Tchihende-Bedonkohe band until Mangas Coloradas was killed while in the custody of the California Column in January 1863. In Mexico he undertook many joint raids with the Nednhi of Juh and Natiza against the Mexicans. After Ponce, Cuchillo Negro and Delgadito were killed too, Victorio took over the Tchihende leadership, joined by the leaderless Bedonkohe (Taklishim, old Mahko's son, had not been able to save his father's leadership in front of his competitors Mano Mocha and Luis). Nana, although at least 20 years older than Victorio, married the latter's elder sister, cementing his position as a leader.

== Victorio's War ==
After several failed attempts to peacefully live on a reservation in their own country, Victorio and Nana gave up trying and fought back against the Americans and Mexicans. The Bedonkohe and Chihenne were joined by more than 80 warriors of the Mescalero Apache under their old chief Caballero. Victorio and Nana therefore had about 200 warriors.

During the Apache Wars and especially Victorio's War Nana raided areas of Texas and Mexico with Victorio. While Nana and a small group was away on a scouting mission, Victorio and his band were surrounded and killed by soldiers of the Mexican Army under Joaquin Terrazas at the Battle of Tres Castillos in October 1880. 68 women and children were captured by the Mexicans and sold as slaves in Mexico.

== Raids ==
After Victorio's death, Nana and his followers hid in the Sierra Madre. Several prestigious leaders and warriors, such as Fun (Yiy-gholl, Yiy-joll, Yiy-zholl, also known as Larry Fun), Ka-ya-ten-nae (Ka-e-te-nay, Kadhateni or Kieta - "Fights Without Arrows", "Cartridges All Gone") took the leadership of the Tchihende, Bedonkohe, Tsokanende and Nednhi bands beside the already established Apache band leaders Nana, Loco, Mangas, Naiche, Geronimo and Juh.

Nana, now almost 80 years old (according to some reports, nearly 90-years), formed his own war party with the Chihenne (Warm Springs Apache), enlisting loitering warriors in the reservations. His band joined by 15 Tsokanende, 12 Mescalero warriors and a couple of Navajo, plus women and children, began raiding Army supply trains and isolated settlers. In less than a month Nana fought seven or eight battles stretching over the course of 1,000 miles and killed 30-40 Americans, at least as many Mexicans, captured about 200 horses to replace 100 ridden to death and then fled back to Mexico. He and his small force, evaded more than 1,000 soldiers, 300-400 civilian militia volunteers and Apache and Navajo Indian Scouts.

== Death ==
Nana survived the Apache Wars. Upon surrender in March 1886 he, other Apache warriors and Apache Scouts were sent as prisoners of war to Florida and Alabama. In 1894, they were relocated to Fort Sill in the Indian Territory, present-day Oklahoma. Nana died of natural causes in 1896.

== Legacy ==
Nana has a special reputation among Apache war chiefs. He was still an active warrior well into his eighties. He had tenacity, stamina, courage and an uncanny ability to improvise in a fight to minimize his losses. He showed no mercy in battle, yet could be considerate when dealing with civilians. When Nana was executing guerrilla tactics in the 1880s, he was half blind, crooked from arthritis, but once he sat in the saddle, he rode "like the devil."

== Bibliography ==
- Nana's Raid: Apache Warfare in Southern New Mexico, 1881 (Lekson, 1987)
