= Mimbreño Apache =

Sub-tribe of Apache people from New Mexico

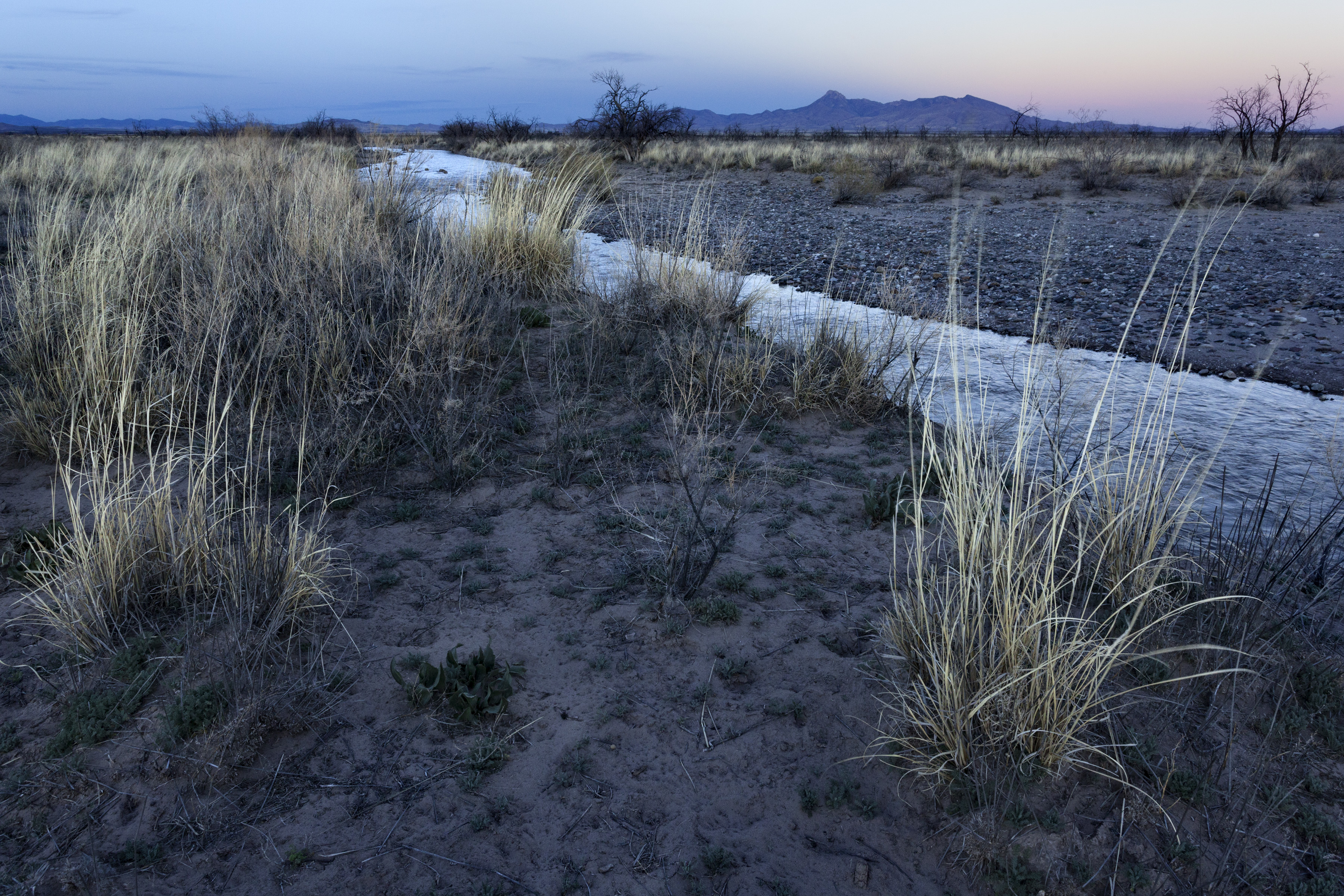
The Mimbreños congregated along and settled the Mimbres River

The Mimbreños were a sub-tribe of Apache, Native Americans, who were based in New Mexico. Their territory included the narrow valley of the Mimbres River to the Rio Grande into the Mimbres Mountains and the Cook's Range.

The band in the Mimbres valley is known as the Tchihende band. Mimbres Apache merged into the Chiricahua Apache, and today many of their descendants are enrolled with the Fort Sill Apache in Oklahoma.

They should not be confused with the Mimbres culture, a pre-contact Ancestral Pueblo people.

== Civic works ==
The Mimbreños developed an irrigation system in the Mimbres Valley which made it possible for the band to stay in one place. This was different from nomadic Apache groups; however, the irrigation system ultimately failed.

== Notable Mimbreños ==
- Mangas Coloradas, 19th-century chief
- Victorio (ca. 1824–1880), chief
