= Britton Davis =

American soldier (1860–1930)

- Born: June 4, 1860; Brownsville, Texas
- Died: January 23, 1930 (aged 69); San Diego, California
- Military career
- Allegiance: United States of America
- Branch: United States Army
- Service years: 1881–1886
- Rank: First Lieutenant
- Nickname: Nantan Enchau “Stout Chief” or “Fat Boy” (by Apaches)
- Unit: 6th Cavalry
- Conflicts: Geronimo's War; Geronimo Campaign

First Lieutenant Britton Davis (June 4, 1860 – January 23, 1930) was an American soldier born in Brownsville, Texas. He served in the United States Army in the 6th Cavalry after graduating from West Point in 1881. After serving at Fort D.A. Russell, Davis was transferred to the Southwest to serve at San Carlos in 1882 during the Apache Wars where he commanded two companies (B and E) of Apache Scouts alongside Captain Emmet Crawford. In 1886, he played a key role in ending the Geronimo Campaign.

Davis penned numerous journals about his service and the Apache language; toward the end of his life, he wrote a biography of Geronimo.

== Army service ==
The son of Edmund J. Davis, former Governor of Texas, Davis graduated 44th in his class at the US Military Academy, West Point in June 1881, and was commissioned to serve at Fort D.A. Russell.

In the spring of 1882, Davis received orders to the Arizona Territory to take command of companies B and E of the Apache Scouts.

On May 15, 1885, a group of well-armed Chiricahuas, including Nana and Geronimo, confronted Davis outside his tent and confessed to an all night tiswin drinking session and demanded to know what the army intended to do about it.

Knowing that the Apaches were goading him into confrontation, he telegraphed General George Crook. The telegram was received by Captain Francis C. Pierce, who took it to Al Sieber, Chief of Scouts. Sieber, hungover himself, dismissed it as a "tiswin drunk" and the message went no further.

Waiting for orders, Davis took no action and as days turned into weeks, the Apaches suspected that a massive reprisal was coming down in the form of military action. Geronimo, fearing an arrest, fled from San Carlos accompanied by Chihuahua, Naiche, Mangus, Nana, Ulzana and their bands . The Apaches made way to Mexico and were in turn pursued by Davis and Lieutenant Marion Perry Maus.

== Later life and death ==
After resigning from the Army in 1886, Davis became superintendent of the Corralitos Mining and Cattle Company in Chihuahua, Mexico.

In 1924 he retired to San Diego, California, where he wrote a biography of Geronimo titled The Truth about Geronimo, which was published after his death.

He was portrayed by Matt Damon in the movie Geronimo: An American Legend.
