= Dutchy (Apache scout) =

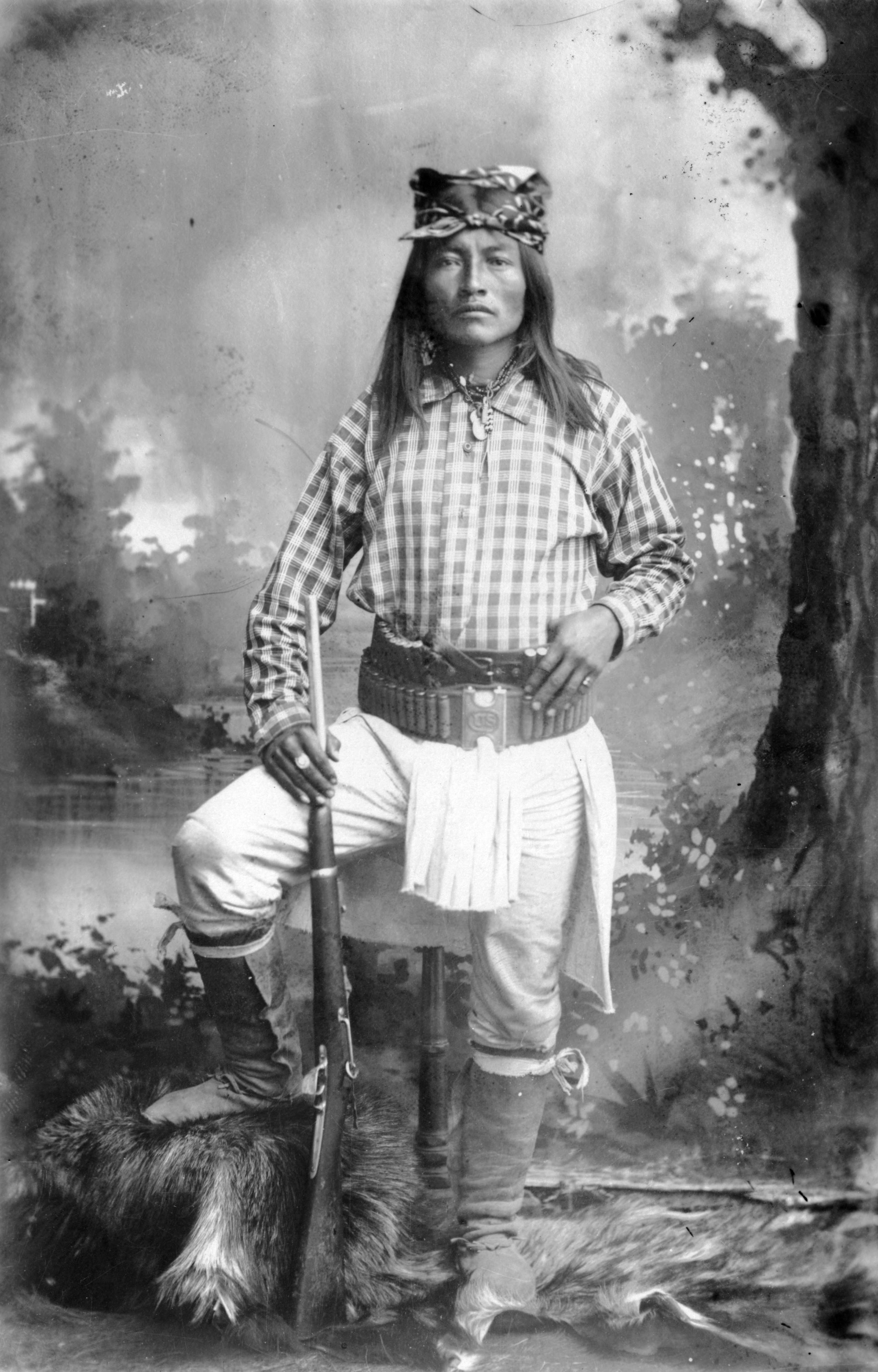

Dutchy (c. 1855 – 12 March 1893), born Bakeitzogie, meaning Yellow Coyote, was a Chiricahua and Apache scout who served with Lieutenant Britton Davis during the Apache Wars.

In the early 1870s, Dutchy's father killed a white man and fled to the hills. According to Britton Davis, Dutchy was then persuaded to kill his father by a religious man who urged Dutchy to save his and his father's souls. Davis describes how rumors described Dutchy returning the next day with his father's head. As a member of the Chatto raiding party, Dutchy raided southern Arizona, surrendering to Davis at San Carlos.

After being held at Fort Thomas, Dutchy ended up being a trustworthy scout, and was thus selected as Emmet Crawford's body-servant. He enlisted on 13 March 1884. He served as a scout with Crawford and was promoted to sergeant of scouts. Dutchy continued as a scout until late in 1886 until he was indicted by a United States grand jury in November 1884 for the murder of Jacob Samuel Ferrin near San Carlos in July 1883. He was beaten to death on 12 March 1893 during a drunken brawl with white soldiers.

== Bibliography ==
- Delgadillo, Alicia (2014). From Fort Marion to Fort Sill: A Documentary History of the Chiricahua Apache Prisoners of War, 1886-1913. University of Nebraska Press. ISBN 978-0803243798.
- Langellier, John P. (2011). Southern Arizona Military Outposts. Langellier. ISBN 978-0738579924.
