= Charles B. Gatewood =

American army officer (1853–1896)

Charles Bare Gatewood
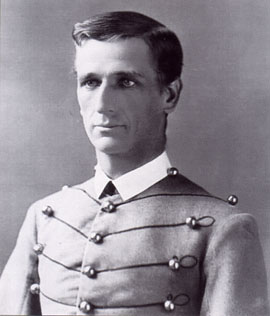
- Born: April 5, 1853; Woodstock, Virginia, U.S.
- Died: May 20, 1896 (aged 43); Fort Monroe, Virginia, U.S.
- Burial place: Arlington National Cemetery (Alexandria, Virginia)
- Education: United States Military Academy (West Point, New York); Class of 1877
- Spouse: Georgia McCulloh
- Military career
- Allegiance: United States
- Branch: United States Army
- Service years: 1877–1896
- Rank: First Lieutenant
- Nicknames: Scipio Africanus "Nanton Bse-che" translated as Big Nose Captain
- Unit: 6th U.S. Cavalry Regiment
- Conflicts: Victorio's War; Geronimo's War; Geronimo Campaign (1885–1886); Battle of Devil's Creek; Johnson County War (Johnson County, Wyoming Territory (1889–1893)

First Lieutenant Charles Bare Gatewood (April 5, 1853 – May 20, 1896) was an American soldier and officer. Born in Woodstock, Virginia, he was raised in nearby Harrisonburg, where his father ran a printing press. He was commissioned a second lieutenant in the United States Army and assigned to the 6th U.S. Cavalry Regiment after graduating from the United States Military Academy at West Point. Upon assignment to the American Southwest territories, Gatewood led platoons of Apache and Navajo scouts against renegades during the Apache Wars.

In 1886, Gatewood played a key role in ending the Geronimo Campaign. He pursued the leader of the campaign, Geronimo, before meeting with him and persuading him to cross back over the Mexico–United States border. With Geronimo holed up in the mountains of northern Mexico, Gatewood eventually convinced him to surrender to himself and commanding general Nelson A. Miles.

Beset with health problems due to exposure to the harsh conditions on the American frontier, Gatewood sustained serious injuries during the Johnson County War. Gatewood retired from the Army in 1895. He was nominated for the Congressional Medal of Honor, but was denied the award. He died of stomach cancer, a year after his retirement.

== Early life ==
Gatewood was born into a family in Woodstock, Virginia, on April 5, 1853. He became a cadet at the United States Military Academy at West Point in 1873 where he earned the nickname Scipio Africanus because of his resemblance to the Roman general of the same name. He graduated 23rd in a class of 76 in June 1877 and commissioned as second lieutenant. He received orders to the 6th US Cavalry in the Southwest at Fort Wingate, New Mexico.

== Apache wars ==
Gatewood led companies of Apache and Navajo Scouts in Apache territory throughout the Southwestern United States. He was respected among the Apaches and earned the nickname Nanton Bse-che, meaning "Big-nosed Captain", sometimes rendered as Nantan Bay-chen-daysen. After one year of service at Fort Wingate, Gatewood was made the commander of Apache scouts from the White Mountain Apache Reservation, and later an aide-de-camp to General Nelson Miles. One of his sergeants was William Alchesay, a scout who was a former White Mountain Chief.

=== Victorio's War ===
In 1879 Gatewood and his Apache scouts were brought from the Arizona Territory to the Black Range Mountains of the adjacent New Mexico Territory further east to capture the Apache Chief Victorio in the Victorio Campaign. He and his scouts were placed under the command of Major Albert P. Morrow of the 9th U.S. Cavalry Regiment at Fort Bayard, New Mexico Territory. Gatewood's scouts skirmished with Victorio's band, but ultimately failed to capture him.

In May 1881 he returned back East to Virginia on sick leave because he had developed rheumatism from exposure to the elements in his two years working with the Apache scouts in the harsh Southwest. He married Georgia McCulloh, the daughter of Thomas G. McCulloh and niece of Richard Sears McCulloh on June 23, 1881, in Cumberland, Maryland. His sick leave expired in July and having not returned to his post, he was declared Absent without leave (AWOL). Gatewood returned to the Southwest on September 17, 1881, under the command of Colonel Eugene Asa Carr in his campaign against the Cibecue and White Mountain Apaches.

=== Geronimo's War ===
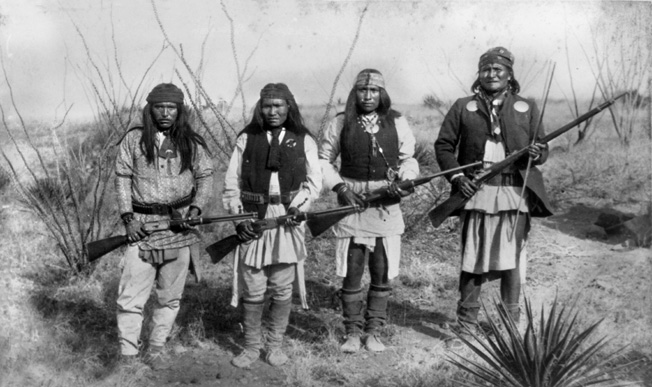
Apache leader Geronimo (right) is depicted with a small band of followers in the remote mountains of northern Mexico in 1886

In 1882, the U.S. Army sent Brigadier General George R. Crook (1828-1890) to take command of Indian operations in Arizona Territory. Crook was an experienced Indian fighter who had long since learned that regular soldiers were almost useless against the Apaches and had based his entire strategy on employing "Indians to fight other Indians". The Apache, as a mark of respect, nicknamed Crook Nantan Lupan, which means "Grey Wolf". Despite having subjugated all the major tribes of Apaches in the Territory; the Apaches had once again taken up arms, this time under the leadership of Geronimo. Crook repeatedly saw Geronimo and his small band of warriors escape every time.

Knowing Gatewood's reputation as one of the army's "Best Apache Men", Crook made him Commandant of the White Mountain Indian Reservation at Fort Apache under Emmet Crawford (1844-1886). Gatewood and Crook disagreed on handling of the reservation and treatment of the Apaches. After a clash with local politicians over grazing rights on reservation land, Crook had Gatewood transferred in 1885 to command Navajo Scouts. That same year Crook resigned his command of the Department of Arizona and Philip Sheridan had him replaced by General Nelson Miles in the Geronimo Campaign.

Although Crook and Gatewood had a falling-out, Gatewood was regarded by Miles as a "Crook Man"; despite this and Gatewood's failing health, Miles knew that Gatewood was well known to Geronimo, spoke some Apache, and was familiar with their traditions and values; having spent nearly 10 years in the field with them and against them.

Gatewood was dispatched by General Miles to seek out Geronimo for a parley. On July 21, when he reached Carretas, Chihuahua, Gatewood encountered another Army officer, Lieutenant James Parker of the 4th Cavalry, who had orders to follow Geronimo's trail. Parker told Gatewood, "The trail is all a myth—I haven't seen any trail since three weeks ago when it was washed out by the rains."

Despite his rapidly deteriorating health, Gatewood refused to quit and Parker guided him to Captain Henry Lawton, who was leading a mission to find and kill Geronimo with the 4th Cavalry. It took two weeks through 150 miles of desert mountain ranges to locate Lawton on the banks of the Aros River on August 3, 1886. Lawton reluctantly allowed Gatewood and his scouts to join his command. Gatewood's health continued to deteriorate. On August 8 he asked Lawton's Surgeon, Leonard Wood, to medically discharge him, but Wood refused. On August 23, 1886, Gatewood led 25 men and two Apache scouts into the Sierra Madre and found Geronimo's camp: his band reduced to 20 men and 14 women and children. On August 24 Gatewood approached Geronimo's camp with only 2 soldiers: George Medhurst Wratten, who was fluent in all Apache dialects and one other; 2 interpreters: Tom Horn and Jesús María Yestes; and two Chiricahua scouts: Kayitah, a Chokonen, and Martine, a Nedni, so as not to alarm the Apaches. Kayitah and Martine made the initial contact, being invited into the camp by the Bavispe River. Kayitah remained in the camp as a hostage while Martine left and returned with Gatewood and 15 pounds of tobacco. After Gatewood made gifts of tobacco, Geronimo teased Gatewood about his thinness and sickly look, Gatewood was then told by Geronimo, "you are always welcome in my camp, and it was always safe for you to come". Gatewood encouraged Geronimo to abandon his fight against the US Army. When asked by Geronimo what Gatewood would do in his situation and to "think like an Apache", Gatewood advised him to "put your trust in Miles".

Agreeing to meet with General Miles, Geronimo's band rode with Gatewood to Lawton's camp in Guadalupe Canyon, the entrance to the United States. Lawton received Geronimo and agreed to allow the Apaches to retain their weapons for defense against nearby Mexican troops. Lawton left for a heliograph station to send word to Miles, leaving Lieutenant Abiel Smith in command. Smith and Wood wanted to disarm the Apaches because they were prisoners-of-war. Smith told Gatewood that he wanted a meeting with Geronimo's men, but Gatewood refused because he knew Smith wanted to murder Geronimo, rather than bring him to Miles. Smith persisted and Gatewood threatened to "blow the head off the first soldier in line", who was Leonard Wood. Wood left to write a dispatch and Gatewood turned to the next man, Smith, who finally relented.

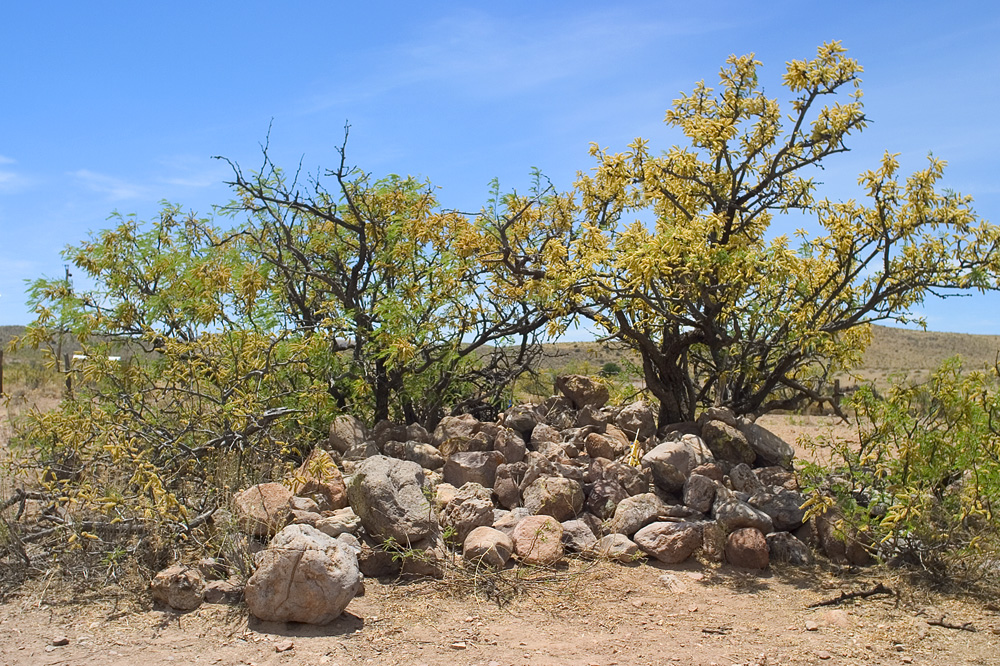
A pile of stones marking the site of Geronimo's surrender

The troops and the Apaches arrived at Skeleton Canyon, Arizona, in the Peloncillo Mountains without incident on September 2, 1886. Miles arrived on September 3, 1886, and Geronimo formally surrendered for the fourth and final time on September 4. At the conclusion of the surrender, Geronimo turned to Gatewood and said to him, in Apache, "Good. You told the truth". The following day Naiche surrendered, he had been in a nearby canyon mourning his brother, who had been killed by Mexican soldiers, bringing the Apache wars to an official end in the Southwest.

Despite his success, Miles chastised Gatewood for "disobeying orders" as Gatewood made the final approach to Geronimo with only a party of 6 instead of 25. Gatewood reasoned that a larger party would have scared the Apache and made them flee. The city of Tucson, Arizona, held a Gala event to celebrate Geronimo's surrender and invited Gatewood to be the guest of honor, but Miles refused to let him attend. Miles appointed Gatewood as his "Aide-de-Camp", to keep the lieutenant under scrutiny, Miles downplayed Gatewood's role in Geronimo's surrender mostly because it would have given legitimacy to Crook's strategy.

== Ghost Dance War ==
In December 1890, Gatewood was reassigned to the Sixth Cavalry, H Troop. His regiment was ordered to South Dakota's Pine Ridge Agency in an operation against hostile Sioux Indians, but was not engaged in the final campaign that culminated in the tragedy at Wounded Knee that December. In January 1891 Gatewood developed rheumatism in both shoulders, again due to the cold weather. His condition progressed to the point where he was unable to move his arms, and had medical orders to leave in February 1891 for Hot Springs, South Dakota.

== Johnson County War ==
By September 1891 Gatewood had recovered and he rejoined the 6th U.S. Cavalry Regiment, then stationed at Fort McKinney, Wyoming Territory (future 44th state of Wyoming, by July 1890). Wyoming was undergoing a range war between ranchers and farmers that would be known as the Johnson County War (1889-1893) and the 6th Cavalry was dispatched at the request of Acting Governor Amos W. Barber. On May 18, 1892, cowboys from the Red Sash Ranch set fire to the fort's Post exchange and planted a bomb in the form of gunpowder in a barracks stove. Gatewood was responding to the fire and was injured by a bomb blast in a barracks; his left arm was shattered, rendering him too disabled to continuing to serve in the cavalry.

Soon after, The 9th U.S. Cavalry Regiment of famous Black / African American "Buffalo Soldiers" was ordered to Fort McKinney to replace the 6th Cavalry.

== Death and legacy ==
On November 19, 1892, Gatewood received orders for Denver, Colorado to await his muster out of the Army. On June 4, 1894, he sought a position as the military advisor of El Paso County, Colorado, to aid in the Cripple Creek miners' strike of 1894 in Cripple Creek, Colorado, but was denied. In 1894 he took a leave of absence from the Army and moved to Fort Myer, Virginia. In 1895 he was recommended for the Medal of Honor by General Nelson A. Miles, "for gallantry in going alone at the risk of his life into the hostile Apache camp of Geronimo in Sonora, August 24, 1886," but was denied by the acting Secretary of War because Gatewood never distinguished himself in hostile action. In 1896 he suffered excruciating stomach pains and went to a Veteran's Hospital in Fort Monroe, Virginia, for treatment. Gatewood died on May 20, 1896, of stomach cancer and was buried at Arlington National Cemetery with full military honors.

The house in which Gatewood was born, in Woodstock, Virginia, stood at 164 Main Street until February 2017, when it was destroyed by fire. The House in which Gatewood was raised and visited his family after he graduated from West Point, recounted in his memoir, still stands at 352 East Market Street in Harrisonburg, Virginia.

On May 23, 1896, Colonel D. S. Gordon, commander of the 6th Cavalry, issued General Order 19, which stated:

It is with extreme sorrow and regret that the Colonel commanding the regiment announced the death of First Lieutenant Charles B. Gatewood at Fort Monroe May 20. Too much cannot be said in honor of this brave officer and it is lamentable that he should have died with only the rank of a Lieutenant, after his brilliant services to the Government. That no material advantages reverted to him is regretted by every officer of his regiment, who extend to his bereaved family their most profound, earnest and sincere sympathy. As a mark of respect to his memory, the officers of the regiment will wear the usual badge of mourning for the period of 30 days.

His son, Charles B. Gatewood, Jr. (1883–1953), joined the Army and rose to the rank of colonel. He campaigned for recognition of his father's name and later compiled and published his father's memoirs.

The role of Gatewood was portrayed in 1954 by Brett King in the syndicated television series, Stories of the Century, starring and narrated by Jim Davis.

Robert Cummings played First Lieutenant Gatewood in the 1960 episode, "The Last Bugle," on Dick Powell's Zane Grey Theatre, the dramatization of the capture of Geronimo. His 1880s expedition to Geronimo in northern Mexico was depicted in the 1964 Western film A Distant Trumpet. He was portrayed by actor Jason Patric in the 1993 Western film Geronimo: An American Legend.

== Bibliography ==
- Capps, Benjamin (1975). The Great Chiefs. Time-Life Education. ISBN 978-0-316-84785-8.
- Chamberlain, Kathleen P. (2007). Victorio: Apache warrior and chief. University of Oklahoma Press. ISBN 978-0-8061-3843-5.
- Debo, Angie (1989). "I have surrendered for the fourth time". Geronimo: The Man, His Time, His Place. University of Oklahoma Press. ISBN 978-0-8061-1828-4.
- DeMontravel, Peter R. (1998). A hero to his fighting men: Nelson A. Miles, 1839–1925. Kent State University Press. ISBN 978-0-87338-594-7.
- Dixon, Wheeler W. (2000). Film genre 2000: new critical essays: The SUNY series, cultural studies in cinema/video. SUNY Press. ISBN 978-0-7914-4514-3.
- Gatewood, Charles B. (2009). Louis Kraft (ed.). LT. Charles Gatewood & His Apache Wars Memoir. University of Nebraska Press. ISBN 978-0-8032-1884-0.
- Greene, Jerome A. (2007). Indian War veterans: memories of army life and campaigns in the West, 1864–1898. Casemate Publishers. ISBN 978-1-932714-26-5.
- Faulk, Odie B. (1993). The Geronimo campaign. Oxford University Press. ISBN 978-0-19-508351-4.
- McCallum, Jack Edward (2006). Leonard Wood: Rough Rider, surgeon, architect of American imperialism. NYU Press. ISBN 978-0-8147-5699-7.
- Kraft, Louis (2000). Gatewood & Geronimo. University of New Mexico Press. ISBN 978-0-8263-2130-5.
- Mazzanovich, Anton (1926). Trailing Geronimo: Some hitherto unrecorded incidents bearing upon the outbreak of the White mountain Apaches and Geronimo's band in Arizona and New Mexico. Gem Publishing Co.
- Roberts, David (1994). Once They Moved Like The Wind: Cochise, Geronimo, And The Apache Wars. New York: Simon and Schuster. ISBN 978-0-671-88556-4.
- Runkle, Benjamin (2011). Wanted Dead Or Alive: Manhunts from Geronimo to Bin Laden. Macmillan. ISBN 978-0-230-10485-3.
- Schubert, Frank N. (1973). "The Suggs Affray: The Black Cavalry in the Johnson County War". The Western Historical Quarterly. 4 (1): 57–68. doi:10.2307/967068. JSTOR 967068.
- Wooster, Robert (1996). Nelson A. Miles and the Twilight of the Frontier Army. University of Nebraska Press. ISBN 978-0-8032-9775-3.
