= Geronimo Campaign =

1885-1886 campaign during the Apache Wars

- Part of Apache Wars
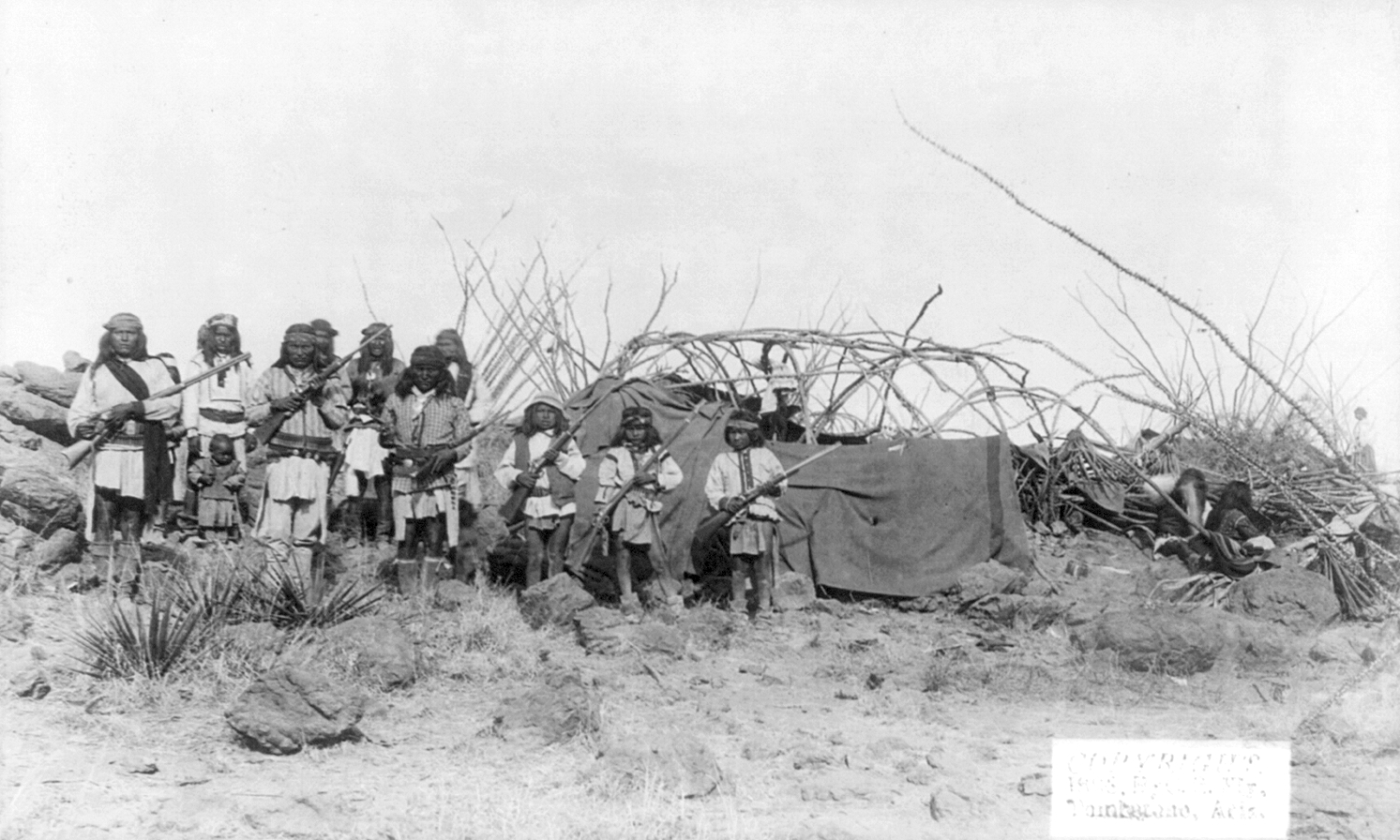
- Naiche and his band at Geronimo's camp on March 27, 1886, shortly before their surrender to General George Crook. Geronimo and his followers did not stay in army custody for long and they later escaped, leading to a final surrender at Skeleton Canyon in September 1886. Photograph taken by C. S. Fly.
Date	May 17, 1885 – September 3, 1886
Location	Arizona Territory, Sonora
Result	Decisive United States victory

Belligerents
United States	Apache	Mexico

Commanders and leaders
(United States) George Crook (United States) Nelson Miles	Geronimo (surrendered); Naiche (surrendered); Ulzana (surrendered)	Unknown

Strength
(United States) 3,000, 193 Apache scouts (1885) (United States) 5,000 (July 1886)	~40 warriors and 100 non-combatants (1885); 20 warriors and 18 non-combatants (September 1886)	(Mexico) 3,000

Casualties and losses
55 civilians killed	20 women and children captured in August 1885; 1 warrior killed (Ulzana's Raid); 20 warriors and 60 non combatants surrendered in March 1886; 18 warriors, 12 women and 6 children surrendered in September 1886; 400 peaceful Apache from San Carlos Reservation deported to Florida	Unknown

Geronimo Campaign, between May 1885 and September 1886, was the last large-scale military operation of the Apache wars. It took more than 5,000 U.S. Army Cavalry soldiers, led by the two experienced Army generals, in order to subdue no more than 70 (only 38 by the end of the campaign in northern Mexico) Chiricahua Apache who fled the San Carlos Apache Indian Reservation and raided parts of the surrounding Arizona Territory and adjacent Sonora state in Mexico for more than a year.

== Background ==
=== Apache wars (1861–1872) ===
Geronimo (original name Goyahkla, meaning One Who Yawns) was a Chiricahua Apache: he was never a chief, but only a warrior. In the summer of 1858, he lost his entire family (mother, wife and three children) when some Mexican troops attacked the Apache camp near the town of Janos, while warriors were in town, bartering with the Mexicans. Geronimo made a name for himself shortly after, when he burned the Mexican town of Arispe in retribution, with the support of the great Apache chief Mangas Coloradas.

In the following years, Geronimo led regular raids into Mexico, and he was present at the Bascom Incident (1861) and the Battle of Apache Pass (1862), which were the beginning of the Apache wars with the US. After Mangas Coloradas was captured and executed by the US Army in 1863, Geronimo took part in his son-in-law Cochise's war of vengeance against the American settlers and miners in Arizona and New Mexico (1863-1872).

=== On the reservation (1872–1881) ===
When Cochise surrendered to the US authorities in 1872 in return for a large reservation in southeastern Arizona, Geronimo settled on the reservation, occasionally raiding in Mexico, but keeping peace on the US side of the border.

However, in 1875, all the Apache tribes were resettled in a much smaller single reservation, San Carlos, nicknamed "Hell's Forty Acres", on unproductive land in the rocky desert. Although Apaches were expected to support themselves by farming, the land given to them was too unproductive for that purpose. The life on the overpopulated reservation was troubled by starvation, disease (like smallpox and malaria) and inter-tribal dispute, made worse by the corruption of the local US traders who charged exorbitant prices to Indians, and Indian agents who routinely mishandled the government funds allotted to help Indians settle in a new, farming way of life.

In 1876, Geronimo and some of his followers escaped the reservation for the first time and fled to Mexico, but were captured in March 1877 when they returned with a herd of stolen horses and forcibly returned to San Carlos. Geronimo stayed in the reservation till 1881, taking no part in the Victorio's War (1879–1880).

=== Renegade leader (1881–1886) ===
However, after the US army started arresting prominent Apache warriors after Cibecue Creek Incident (September 1881), Geronimo fled for Siera Madre mountains in Mexico with some 70 warriors. In Mexico, Geronimo joined Nana's band, and for two years with about 80 warriors raided farms and ranches on both sides of the border. In 1883, Apaches raided a mining camp in Arizona and killed a judge in New Mexico.

When the Apache raids in the US resumed, the US government appointed general George Crook as military commander in Arizona. General Crook tried an original approach – improving living conditions on the San Carlos Reservation, hiring Apache scouts on the reservation to fight renegade Apache raiders and collaborating with Mexican authorities on the other side of the border. These measures gave immediate results – Crook's army comprising only 42 US cavalrymen and 193 Apache scouts crossed into Mexico in May 1883 and successfully found Geronimo's band in the Siera Madre mountains. Attacked in his lair, although he lost only a few warriors, Geronimo agreed to meet Crook and surrender. The raiders arrived at San Carlos in March 1884 and lived peaceably for a time.

== Geronimo Campaign ==
=== Crook's Campaign (May 1885 – March 1886) ===
One night in May 1885, Geronimo got drunk with several other chiefs; however, consumption of alcohol by reservation Indians was illegal. Fearing reprisals, Geronimo again fled into Mexico with about 130 followers. General Crook set off his forces in pursuit, comprising some 3,000 men, including 200 Apache scouts, but Apaches were an elusive enemy, fleeing from the army units and attacking ranches and farms. During the winter of 1885-1886, US forces doggedly hunted Geronimo through the Sierra Madre with little success. In March 1886, Geronimo surrendered to General Crook, but before the US forces could escort him across the border, Geronimo broke his word and fled with 20 warriors and 18 camp followers. Crook was severely criticised in Washington DC for his failure to capture Geronimo, as well as for his strategy of negotiations with Indians and using Apache scouts to fight Apache. On April 1, 1886, Crook was relieved of his command and replaced with general Nelson Miles, who defeated the Indians in the Nez Perce War (1877).

=== Miles' Campaign (April 1886 – September 1886) ===
Miles' first action was to relocate all the Apaches (including Crook military scouts) to Florida, in order to deprive Geronimo from his source of manpower and support in Arizona. Second, he ordered heliographs built along the border, in order to quickly get information about the Apache raids and spread about 5,000 troops in small detachments in order to promptly respond to any Apache attack. However, all this effort gave no results, as Apache raiders successfully applied hit-and-run tactics over the vast territories – they attacked a ranch in Arizona, then the town of Nogales a few days later, without any loses on their side. With nothing to show for the enormous resources he spent, in August 1886, General Miles was forced to negotiate. Geronimo met his envoy, Lieutenant Gatewood, and learned that his family and his entire people were exiled to Florida because of his defiance. That news broke Geronimo's will to fight, and he surrendered for the final time to General Miles in September 1886.

== Casualties ==
=== American casualties ===
Geronimo's band killed 17 American civilians on the run to Mexican border in May 1885.

In Ulzana's Raid from November 23 to the end of 1885, the 12 Apache raiders led by Ulzana covered 1,200 miles (1,931 km), killed 38 people, and captured 250 head of livestock with just a single casualty.

=== Indian casualties ===
During Crook's Campaign, 20 women and children were captured in August 1885, a single warrior was killed in Ulzana's Raid in December 1885, and 20 warriors and 60 non combatants surrendered in March 1886.

During Miles' Campaign, 18 warriors, 12 women and 6 children surrendered in September 1886, and 400 peaceful Apache from San Carlos Reservation, including Apache Scouts, were deported to Florida.

== Aftermath ==
Geronimo spent two years in prison in Fort Pickens (on Santa Rosa Island, off Florida) with his warriors, while their families were moved to Fort Marion, 300 miles away. In all, he spent 23 years in captivity, first in Florida, later in Southern Oklahoma, but he never returned to his homeland in Arizona. He died in 1909 of pneumonia, aged about 80. He was the last of the Indian rebels to surrender.
