= Emmet Crawford =

American soldier (1844–1886)

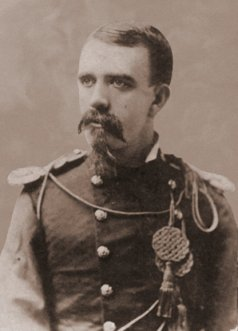
- Emmet Crawford - Portrait taken 1876
- Born: December 22, 1844; Pennsylvania
- Died: January 18, 1886 (aged 41) near Nacori, Mexico
- Burial place: Arlington National Cemetery
- Military career
- Allegiance: United States of America; Union
- Branch: United States Army; Union Army
- Service years: 1861-1886
- Rank: Captain
- Units: 71st Pennsylvania Infantry; 3rd U. S. Cavalry
- Conflicts: American Civil War: Battle of Antietam; First Battle of Fredericksburg; Second Battle of Fredericksburg; Great Sioux War: Battle of Rosebud; Battle of Slim Buttes; Geronimo's War: Crawford Affair

Emmet Crawford (December 22, 1844 – January 18, 1886) was an American soldier who rose through the ranks to become an officer. He was most noted for his time spent in the Arizona Territory under General George Crook in the United States Cavalry. He was killed in pursuit of the Apache leader Geronimo in January 1886 in Mexico.

== Early life ==
Emmet Crawford was the second of four sons of William and Jemima Crawford of Philadelphia, Pennsylvania (according to the 1850 U.S. Census). Charles was the eldest of the four brothers, followed by Emmet, Zachariah, and Henry, the youngest. By 1860, the family had been split, with Emmet, Zachariah, and Jemima showing up in the 1860 census living separately but still in Philadelphia. William Crawford does not show up in the 1860 census in Philadelphia. While Emmet continued to have contact with Charles and his mother, he only remained close to his brother Zachariah (or Zachary T Crawford).

== Military service ==
=== Civil War ===
Lying about his age, in May 1861, in order to join the army, Crawford enlisted in the 71st Pennsylvania Infantry Regiment, fighting in many actions as part of the Army of the Potomac, including the Battle of Antietam and the Battle of Fredericksburg. Wounded in the Second Battle of Fredericksburg in spring 1863, Crawford was sent to Philadelphia to convalesce. During his recovery, he attended the first officer training school designed to train white officers assigned to command U.S. Colored Troops. Returned to duty in June 1864, just in time to be mustered out with the rest of the 71st Pennsylvania Regiment, Crawford and brothers Charles and Zachary all reenlisted in the 197th Pennsylvania Infantry. Crawford received his appointment as a first lieutenant with the colored troops, but was not reassigned until September 1864. The war's ending found Crawford assigned to the 13th Colored Artillery in Bowling Green, Kentucky.

=== Fort Verde ===
Crawford was recommended for retention of service and, in February 1866, accepted an appointment as second lieutenant in the 37th Colored Infantry in Wilmington, North Carolina. He survived the post-war trimming of the army in the late 1860s and on January 2, 1871, was assigned to the 3rd Cavalry as a first lieutenant. He was sent to Fort Verde in Arizona Territory, north of Tucson.

=== Sioux Wars ===
On January 2, 1872, the 3rd Cavalry was transferred north to fight the Sioux in Nebraska and Wyoming Territory. Crawford was stationed at Fort D.A. Russell (later F.E. Warren Air Force Base). His company was sent to the Red Cloud Agency to assist J.J. Saville in March 1874. The camp they established was named Camp Robinson, later renamed Fort Robinson. In November 1874, Crawford and his company were transferred to Sidney Barracks and served in many capacities in Nebraska.

In early summer 1876, the 3rd Cavalry under General George Crook was sent to Montana Territory as part of a three-pronged effort to force the Sioux back to the reservation. The other two commanders were General John Gibbon and Lieutenant Colonel George Custer. On June 17, 1876, Crook's forces were attacked at Rosebud Creek by the Sioux in strength. After a six-hour battle, Crook claimed a narrow victory and retreated to his base camp. On June 25, only a short distance away, along the Little Bighorn River, Lieutenant Colonel Custer and his immediate command were all killed in the Battle of the Little Bighorn.

In late 1876, Crawford was reassigned to recruiting duty in Baltimore, Maryland for two years. He returned to the 3rd Cavalry in Nebraska before the end of 1878. He was stationed at Camp Sheridan and Fort Robinson and later at Fort D.A. Russell.

=== Fort Thomas ===
In the spring of 1882, the 3rd Cavalry was transferred to Arizona to deal with the Apache. Crawford was assigned to Fort Thomas, near the San Carlos Apache Indian Reservation. In September 1882, General Crook assigned Crawford to San Carlos as military commandant, where he was to work with the civilian agent to maintain peace and help the Indians become self-supporting. He enlisted and trained Apaches as scouts. Assisting him were Lt. Charles B. Gatewood, 6th Cavalry, and Lt. Britton Davis of the 3rd. The Apache scouts proved their worth on a campaign in 1883. Crawford's concern that the Apaches be treated fairly led to friction with the agent P. P. Wilcox. This led to Crawford's requesting a transfer to Texas, but a month later, he was recalled to deal with Geronimo.

=== Apache Wars ===
Geronimo headed for Mexico with the cavalry in pursuit, thanks to a border-crossing agreement with Mexico. They spent the spring of 1885 in a fruitless attempt at capturing Geronimo. After returning to Fort Bowie to refit, Crawford headed out with only Apache scouts, Tom Horn (the civilian chief of scouts), three officers, Lt. Marion Maus, Lt. Samson L. Faison, and Lt. William Shipp, and the surgeon Dr. Davis. On December 11, 1885, they crossed the border into Mexico, and according to the border agreement, Crawford stopped to inform the Mexican authorities that they were in pursuit of the hostiles before pushing on into the rugged Sierra Madres.

The Apache scouts picked up Geronimo's trail and, on January 9, 1886, they located his camp. They continued through the night and successfully attacked the next morning. Geronimo's band fled, leaving all their stock, provisions and blankets. Geronimo sent an old woman to Crawford to talk, and a meeting was set the following morning.

The next morning started with an attack by Mexican irregular troops under the command of Mauricio Corredor at Teopari, District of Sahuaripa. Corredor six years earlier was engaged at the Battle of Tres Castillos (29.91°N 105.82°W), where 62 Apache warriors and 16 non-combatants had been killed in that massacre. Crawford attempted to get them to stop by waving a white handkerchief, but was shot in the head. Dutchy, one of the Apache scouts, pulled the mortally wounded Crawford to safety, and then killed the Mexican who had shot him. He also slew the Mexican commander. Crawford did not die immediately, but he never regained consciousness. On January 13, Lieutenant Maus met with Geronimo and obtained the surrender of some of his band and an agreement that Geronimo would meet with General Crook in two months. Maus proceeded to carry the wounded Crawford back to the border, but on January 18, he died. His body was buried in the little village of Nacori Chico. Crawford's death nearly sparked a second war between the United States and Mexico, but after an official hearing, no further action was taken.

General Crook did meet with Geronimo as agreed, but Geronimo did not return. Crook resigned over the incident and Geronimo was not brought in until September. Later, Crook stated his belief that if Crawford had not been killed, he would have been successful in obtaining Geronimo's surrender and ending the Apaches' bloody raids.

== Burial ==
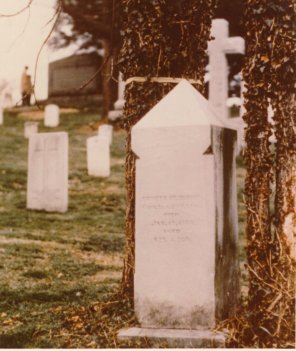
Emmet Crawford's Grave in Arlington

Crawford's body was exhumed and reburied in Kearney, Nebraska, where his younger brother Zachary lived. Emmet had never married, and Zachary and his family were his closest relatives. It was one of the largest funerals Nebraska had ever seen.

In 1908, Crawford's former comrades, by then including many generals, were granted permission by his closest relative, sister-in-law Caroline Crawford, to have his body moved to Arlington National Cemetery. On December 1, 1908, with full military honors, the body of Emmet Crawford was put to rest. His grave is located down the hill from General Crook's tomb and is marked by a marble obelisk.

== Legacy ==
The town of Crawford, Nebraska, incorporated in 1886, was named after Emmet Crawford. In 1986, the descendants of Zachary Crawford were invited to the centennial celebrations of the town and served as grand marshals of the centennial parade. The remaining descendants still live in Nebraska today.

Fort Crawford in Colorado was named after him in 1886.

== Miscellaneous ==
- Emmet Crawford is mentioned in many books covering the events of the Indian Wars and is shown in many field photographs.
- One of the original adobe officer's duplexes at Fort Robinson is named after him.
- He was portrayed by Jeremy Slate in the 1979 TV movie Mr. Horn and was given a fictitious sister portrayed by Karen Black.
