= Crawford affair =

- Part of Geronimo's War, Apache Wars
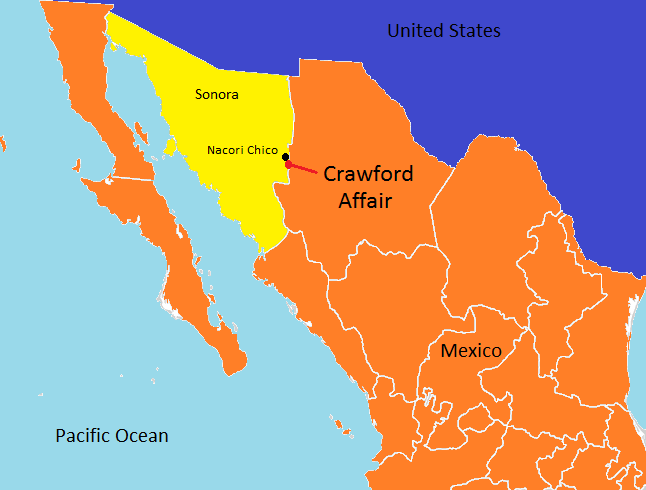
Date	January 11, 1886
Location	near Nacori Chico, Sonora, Mexico
Result	Status quo ante bellum

Belligerents
United States	Mexico

Commanders and leaders
Emmet Crawford †	Mauricio Corredor †

Strength
~100	~150

Casualties and losses
1 killed 4 wounded	4 killed 5 wounded

The Crawford affair was a battle fought between Mexico and the United States in January 1886 during the Geronimo Campaign. Captain Emmet Crawford was commanding a company of Apache scouts, sixty miles southeast of Nacori Chico in Sonora, when his camp was attacked by Mexican Army militiamen. In the action, Crawford was shot and later died; his death nearly started a war between the United States and Mexico.

== Background ==
Following Geronimo's escape from the San Carlos Reservation in Arizona, the United States Army began the Geronimo Campaign to capture the Apache leader who had fled into Mexico. It was during this operation that Captain Crawford, of the 3rd Cavalry, was ordered to proceed south from Fort Apache to pursue the natives. He took with him, just under 100 Apache scouts with Lieutenants Marion P. Maus, William Shipp and Samuel L. Faison. Among the party was the Apache Kid and three armed civilians, including the famous scout Tom Horn, a doctor named T. B. Davis, and Concepción, a translator who spoke Apache.

Crawford and the company left the fort and crossed the border at Agua Prieta on December 11, 1885. There Crawford informed the Mexicans that he was pursuing hostile natives into the Sierra Madre Occidental. He also established a truce with the Mexicans so as to ensure his command's safety from the Mexican Army. On January 8, marching through the mountains, strewn with canyons, the Apache scouts discovered signs of a hostile Apache village in the distance. So for the next forty-eight hours, Crawford pushed his scouts forward in an attempt to attack the village before the enemy could detect them and retreat. All through the night of January 9 and the early morning of January 10, the Apache scouts led a stealthy advance through the canyons. Many of the scouts hurt themselves by falling in the darkness but they continued on for eighteen hours until they reached the village.

An attack was made at daybreak on January 10 without incident, a few of Geronimo's Apaches and some horses were captured while the majority fled. Crawford decided to rest his men at the camp, as they were exhausted from their trek across the desert.

== Affair ==
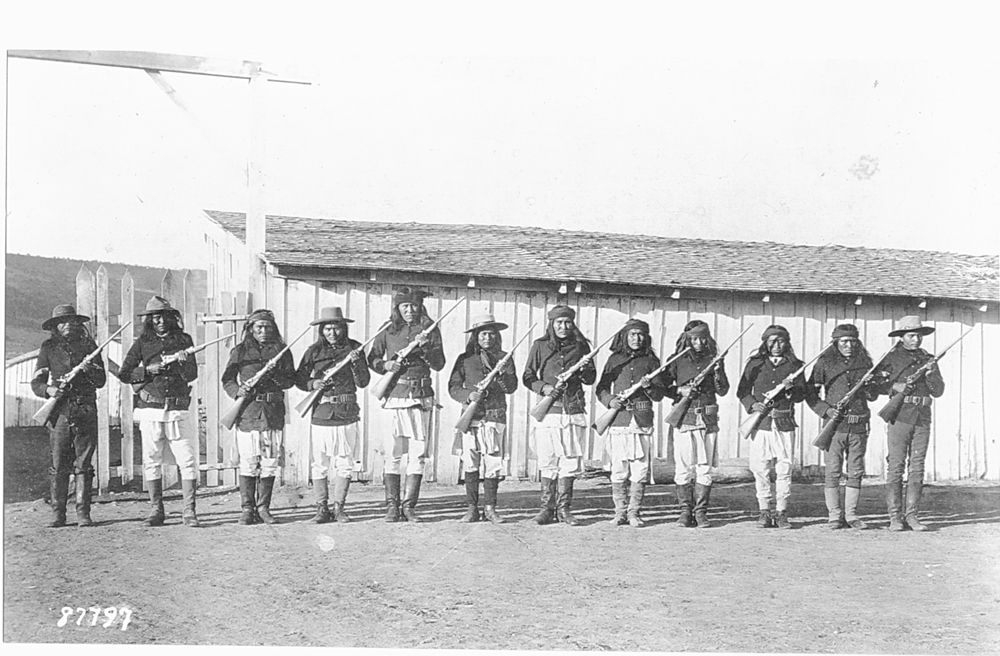
Apache Scouts at Fort Wingate in New Mexico Territory during the 1880s.

In the afternoon of January 10, the Americans and their Apache scouts were making camp when a native American woman approached to tell Captain Crawford that Geronimo was a few miles away and wanted to speak with him. The two agreed that on the following day, a council would be held to negotiate an end to the Geronimo campaign. Peace was expected, so Crawford and his company waited joyfully until the next morning at daybreak when the captain was awoken by one of his sentries who warned that Mexican troops were approaching. Believing the Mexicans to be another force of Apache scouts under the command of Captain Wirt Davis, some of Crawford's Apaches began shouting calls in their native language. In response, the Mexican force, which included Tarahumara detribalized natives, opened up with a volley of rifle fire.

Immediately Crawford grabbed a white flag and rushed to a large rock and climbed to the top where he was in full view of the Mexicans. Crawford, with his blue coat on, waved the flag as he shouted "Soldados Americanos" along with Tom Horn. In Marion P. Maus' report of the battle he said that the Mexicans knew well of who they were firing at. An investigation launched by the Mexican government also came to the same conclusion. After the first volley a small group of the Mexicans advanced and Lieutenant Maus went to speak with them. Maus told the group that they were American soldiers and would not return fire. He then turned back for camp, when Captain Crawford ordered him to speak with the Mexicans again, to ensure a cease fire.

Maus turned back into the direction of the Mexicans, but they opened fire. One of the bullets, reportedly fired by the Mexican commander, General Mauricio Corredor, hit Captain Crawford in the head. The Apache scouts were furious after seeing their commander gunned down and returned fire on the Mexicans. For an hour the two sides skirmished until the Mexicans waved a white flag. The Americans had lost Captain Crawford, who died on January 18, and four men wounded including Tom Horn, who was shot in the arm. The Mexicans lost four men killed and five wounded, among them General Corredor who six years earlier had killed Victorio, an important Apache war chief.

== Aftermath ==
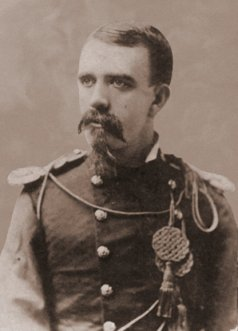
Emmet Crawford in 1876.

When the Mexicans raised the white flag a ceasefire began, and Lieutenant Maus approached the Mexican line with Tom Horn. The two talked with the Mexicans for a while and concluded that the Mexicans were after scalps for the high bounty established by the Mexican government. One scalp of an Apache warrior was worth 200 silver pesos while a woman or a child's scalp was worth 100. Eventually Tom Horn went back to his side of the lines, leaving Lieutenant Maus alone with the Mexicans. As the lieutenant attempted to leave, the Mexicans demanded that they be given some mules to transport their wounded. Maus agreed, so six mules were given to the Mexicans. However, the Mexicans made a gesture as though they would not let Maus go, so the scouts let out a loud war cry, which frightened the Mexicans into freeing the lieutenant.

The United States Army later issued a statement which claimed that if Crawford had survived he would have met with Geronimo and ended the war sooner. Crawford's death was felt most in Nebraska where his funeral was one of the largest in the state's history. The body of the well liked and respected captain was later moved in 1908 to Arlington National Cemetery where a large marble obelisk was erected over his grave. The death of Crawford nearly sparked another war between the United States and Mexico, but after the Americans ended their own investigation, the matter was not pursued. Crawford, Nebraska, next to Fort Robinson, was named for the captain and Lieutenant Maus received a Medal of Honor.

== See also ==
- Crabb Massacre
- Texas Revolution
- Battle of Salado Creek
- Mexican–American War
- Border War (1910–19)
