= Battle of Devil's Creek =

Part of Geronimo's War in 1885

- Part of Geronimo's War, Apache Wars
Date	May 22, 1885
Location	near Alma, New Mexico
Result	United States victory

Belligerents
United States	Apache

Commanders and leaders
(United States) James Parker (United States) Charles B. Gatewood	Geronimo

Strength
Unknown	~25 warriors

Casualties and losses
3 wounded	Unknown

The Battle of Devil's Creek was a military engagement during Geronimo's War, fought on May 22, 1885 near Alma, New Mexico. Though it was a minor skirmish, it was the first battle of the Geronimo campaign and ended after the Apaches were routed from their positions.

== Battle ==
On May 16, 1885, about twenty-five Chiricahuas were on one of their many raids into Arizona and New Mexico from northern Mexico. That day the renegades had killed two miners near Alma and stole some horses so on May 17 Captain Allen Smith set out from Fort Apache, Arizona and headed for the site of the latest murder. Smith was leading a force of two companies from the 4th Cavalry and some of the Apache Scouts under Lieutenants Leighton Finley and Charles B. Gatewood. On the sixth day Smith's command was riding through canyonlands along Devil's Creek, in the Mogollon Mountains, when suddenly the Apaches opened fire with rifles from the top of a large cliff. During the fight that ensued, one Apache scout and two American soldiers were wounded and two of their horses were killed. The soldiers and scouts who fought in the battle believed Geronimo was leading the renegades but author Gregory Michno says it was a warrior named Chihuahua. Captain Smith reported the following about the encounter;

...As no one with me knew anything about the country we were in; and as this was the first water we had found since leaving camp, I determined to go into camp. The creek was between two mountains about 600 feet high and very steep. About an hour after going into camp I sent some Scouts up the Mt. on the South side to look up the trail. When they got near the top they were fired on by the Chiricahuas. The Scouts came down on the run but rallied and went up the Mt. with the men, who immediately charged up. The Indians had selected a good point to receive us, but we got to the top so well, and so rapidly under the circumstances that they broke and ran soon before we got to the top. About 600 yds further on we found their main camp. I believe this to be the first camp they had made from the time they left Turkey Creek. In the camp we got a large quantity of meat drying, one saddled horse and two other horses. There were nineteen fires in this camp. The fight lasted about half an hour, and the Indians fired very rapidly and a great many shots. Two men, Pvt Haag, Troop A, shot in right thigh, and Pvt Williams, Troop K, slightly wounded in arm, and one scout shot, quite badlythrough left armone horse killed and another wounded, belonging to TroopAwere the casualties on our side. From the indications, blood near the rifle pits, etc., I am of the opinion that we wounded some of the Indians. The officers, Lts. Parker, Gatewood, Lockett & Finley, 10th Cavy, men and Scouts all behaved remarkably well. Lt. Parker who was closest to the front of the attack, was the first officer on top of the Mt. After the fight (I had some men saddle up all the horses while the fight was going on) I advanced three or four miles, beyond where the fight took place, but as the trail was scattered in every direction & the Scouts could tell me nothing about water beyond I returned to my camp, leaving a guard on the Mt. I attended to the wounded the best I could. The wounded Scout says Geronimo shot him. The Indians were evidently laying for us, as they had made their trail so they could have had a cross fire on the command as we climbed the Mt. It was fortunate I went into camp & disappointed them, as they undoubtedly would have hurt us more with less chance for us to retaliate than we had. When we got on top of the Mt. every sign of the Indians themselves has disappeared. The top of Mt. for several miles was heavily timbered.

One American soldier, in a post-war account of the engagement, said that "several men had been bathing in the stream when the Indians opened up and they carried on the fight in their birthday uniforms." At the time Lieutenant Leighton Finley was in the 10th Cavalry but he was detached from his unit to command the Apache scouts when they rode with the 4th Cavalry. At the request of Lieutenant James Parker, a future general, Lieutenant Finley wrote the following account of the skirmish at Devils Creek;

After Captain Smith and Lieut. Lockett had left and at about 2 oclock, the herd still being driven, slowly, on account of the steepness, up the side of the easterly hill, and not yet, as I remember, having quite arrived at the summit, a shot was fired, followed quickly by other shots, and almost immediately firing began sharp and rapidthis fire, as subsequently discovered, being drawn from the hostiles by the scouts whom Lieut. Gatewood in obedience to Capt. Smiths orders had sent to the summit of the easterly hill to act as videttes. You [James Parker], Lieut. Gatewood and myself were seated, under a tree, on the easterly bank of the creek. All of the enlisted men, except those of the pack train, were in camp in the west bank of the creek. Troop K nearest to us and Troop A lower down. I do not believe the canyon was fifty yards wide. You, Lieut. Gatewood and I got on our feet at the first shot, and the quick subsequent firing immediately indicated what was up. Sergeant Warren of Troop K called to the men Get to the herd. I heard you say Never mind the herd, get your guns! I repeated that order, and when I looked around, not three seconds later I saw you with your four or five men starting up the easterly hill. I called to the rest of the men, Come on! and ran after you. The first line which reached the top of the hill consisted of about seventeen men all told, officers and enlisted men; most of the enlisted men being of Troop K.... You took us up by rushes, taking advantage of various ledges of rock to rest us. The hill was particularly steep and I cannot believe it was less than 500 feet high. Lieutenant Gatewood came up the hill immediately behind this first line. When we got about half way up, as I remember, we met the herd being driven down; the members of the herd guard doing their duty splendidly. After we passed the herd some little distance, we met the Indian scouts running down. I heard Lieutenant Gatewood shout to them and rally them, and he brought them up to the summit immediately after we arrived there. The hostiles continued their fire until we were nearly to the top. On reaching the summit we discovered that the hostiles had run from the crest, scattering in every direction. In a few minutes some of the men pushed forward and discovered the hostile camp on the plateau, about 500 yards from the summit. Seventeen fires were still either burning or filled with live or hot coals. The hostiles left behind them in their haste several articles of clothing and equipment and a lot of beef. One of the scouts captured a pony saddle and bridle. Between five and ten minutes, as I remember, after we reached the summit, Lieutenant Lockett got up and about five minutes later Captain Smith arrived.

On June 1, 1885 the Department of Arizona's commander, General George Crook, sent a telegram to the Division of the Pacific in San Francisco, California: "Captain Smith reports that he has the best of the main body of Indians. Will send a detachment to vicinity of Stevens Ranch on Eagle Creek with a view to picking up any who may try to skulk back to the Reservation." However, the "main body" was actually heading back to Mexico and they "easily" slipped past the American troops posted at Stein's Pass and the troops under Captain Henry Lawton along the border between Arizona and New Mexico. A smaller band under Chief Mangus was still raiding in New Mexico but they were under pursuit by troops of the 6th Cavalry.

== See also ==
- Mexican Apache Wars
- Ute Wars
- Navajo Wars
