= Neil Canton =

American film producer (born 1948)

- Born: 30 May 1948 (age 78); New York City, New York, U.S.
- Education: American University
- Occupation: Film producer
- Relatives: Mark Canton (brother)

Neil Canton (born 30 May 1948) is an American film producer from New York City best known for his work on the Back to the Future trilogy. Canton currently serves as an instructor and mentor at the American Film Institute Conservatory as a member of the Producing faculty.

== Early life ==
His younger brother, Mark Canton, is also a film producer.

== Education ==
Canton studied at the American University (DC). He graduated in 1970.

== Filmography ==
He was a producer in all films unless otherwise noted.

=== Film ===
Year	Film	Credit
1980	Blood Beach	Associate producer
1984	The Adventures of Buckaroo Banzai Across the 8th Dimension	
1985	Back to the Future	
1987	The Witches of Eastwick	
1988	Caddyshack II	
1989	Back to the Future Part II	
1990	Back to the Future Part III	
1992	Trespass	
1993	Geronimo: An American Legend	
1995	Money Train	
2000	Duets	Executive producer
2000	Get Carter	
2001	Angel Eyes	Executive producer
2002	Interstate 60	
2002	Trapped	Executive producer
2005	Land of the Dead	Co-producer

Miscellaneous crew

Year	Film	Role	Notes
1972	What's Up, Doc?	Production aide	
1973	Paper Moon	Production assistant	
1976	Nickelodeon	Production assistant	
1978	The Last Waltz	Production assistant	Concert film
1979	The Warriors	Assistant to Walter Hill	
2018	The Other Side of the Wind	Production associate	

== Awards ==
Wins

- Western Heritage Awards: Theatrical Motion Picture, for Geronimo: An American Legend (1993).

Nominations

- BAFTA Awards: BAFTA Film Award for Best Film, for Back to the Future (1985).
