= Ulzana (film) =

1974 film

- Directed by: Gottfried Kolditz
- Written by: Gottfried Kolditz; Gojko Mitic; Hans-Joachim Wallstein
- Produced by: Dorothea Hildebrandt
- Starring: Gojko Mitic; Renate Blume; Rolf Hoppe
- Cinematography: Helmut Bergmann
- Edited by: Christa Helwig
- Music by: Karl-Ernst Sasse
- Production companies: DEFA; Filmstudio Bucuresti; Mosfilm
- Distributed by: Progress Film
- Release date: 16 May 1974
- Running time: 91 minutes
- Countries: East Germany; Romania; Soviet Union
- Language: German

Ulzana is a 1974 western film directed by Gottfried Kolditz and starring Gojko Mitic as Ulzana, Renate Blume and Rolf Hoppe. It is a Red Western, made as a co-production between East Germany, Romania and the Soviet Union. It is a sequel to the 1973 film Apachen.

== Synopsis ==
Set in 19th-century Arizona, the film depicts the conflict between the Mimbreno Apacheans, led by war chief Ulzana, and Captain Burton, a corrupt army officer employed by White American merchants to remove the tribe from the land.

== Cast ==
- Gojko Mitic as Ulzana
- Renate Blume as Leona
- Rolf Hoppe as captain Burton
- Colea Rautu as Nana
- Amza Pellea as general Crook
- Fred Delmare as Bob Tribolett, the saloon waiter
- Alfred Struwe as Aldrigton, Tucson's mayor
- Dorel Iacobescu as Hackii
- Dinu Gherasim as the colonel
- Dan Sandulescu as Buuly, the army scout
- Hannjo Hasse as the gentleman from Washington
- Werner Dissel as the Mexican doctor
- Fritz Mohr as sergeant Winter
- Paul Berndt as John Richard Wardley, the rider from Tucson
- Klaus Gehrke as Ball, the postmaster
- Holger Eckert as Cayrol, the bank director
- Walter Wickenhauser as Howard, the owner of 'Tucson Evening Star'

== Production ==
The film's sets were designed by the art director Heinz Röske. It was shot on location in Romania and Uzbekistan. The studio managed to purchase an English carriage from 1880 for DM 11,000, flown to Samarkand for filming and reassembled for the filming. It was destroyed after the production dropped it down a ravine.

== Reception ==
Joe Hembus of Western-Lexikon gave the film a mixed review, writing that it was "often more astute in its historical observations and conclusions than in its structure and presentation.” Lexikon des internationalen Films did not give much praise to the film either, stating: "Despite a comparatively coherent portrayal of the motives and causes behind the Indian Wars of the last century, it is little more than a romanticized tall tale in which the Native Americans embody Western virtues while the white men represent their decline. Restrained in its depiction of violence." In a 2004 retrospective, Engelke Henning and Simon Kopp described the film as reversing the plots of American westerns, in which Native Americans fighting invaders are centered over the perspectives of White Americans fighting the Natives in films like John Ford's Stagecoach.

== See also ==
- Ulzana's Raid (another film featuring the historical figure of Ulzana)

== Bibliography ==
- Ivanova, Mariana (3 October 2019). Cinema of Collaboration: DEFA Coproductions and International Exchange in Cold War Europe. Berghahn Books. ISBN 978-1-78920-343-1.
