= Joaquín Martínez =

American actor (1930–2012)

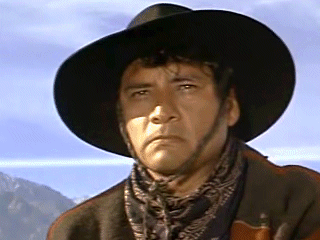
- Joaquín Martínez in the film Joe Kidd, 1972
- Born: November 5, 1930; Cozumel, Mexico
- Died: January 3, 2012 (aged 81); Everdingen, Netherlands
- Occupation: Actor
- Years active: 1962–2005

Joaquín Martínez (November 5, 1930 – January 3, 2012) was a Mexican film, television, and theatre actor. Often appearing in Westerns, Martínez had roles in Jeremiah Johnson, in which he played a Crow chief, and Ulzana's Raid, which was directed by Robert Aldrich and co-starred Burt Lancaster.

Martínez was often typecast in roles that stereotyped Latinos, Native Americans, and Mexicans, but he frequently changed and reworked his characters through his acting, sometimes causing tensions with a production's director.

== Early life ==
Martínez was born on November 5, 1930, in Cozumel, Mexico. His interest in acting led him to study method acting under Seki Sano.

== Career ==
His professional breakthrough came in the 1967 Mexican dramatic film Pedro Páramo, which was directed by Carlos Velo and premiered at the Cannes Film Festival that same year. He moved to Los Angeles, California, shortly after making Pedro Páramo, where he worked as a professional film, television, and stage actor for more than 30 years.

In Jeremiah Johnson, which was set in the American West shortly after the Mexican American War, Martínez and Robert Redford's characters come into conflict but come to an understanding and peace in the film's silent wordless finale. In addition to Jeremiah Johnson and Ulzana's Raid, both released in 1972, Martínez was cast opposite Anthony Quinn and Kevin Costner in the 1990 movie Revenge, as well as the 1993 film, The House of the Spirits. Martínez's appearance in Revenge reportedly fulfilled a longtime dream to work with Anthony Quinn, who was also originally from Mexico.

Film director Lee Tamahori specifically cast Martínez in the James Bond film Die Another Day due to his performance in Ulzana's Raid. Martínez was cast by Tamahori in 2001 and Die Another Day was released in 2002.

Martínez often appeared in Western films, television shows, and miniseries, such as Stones for Ibarra, Centennial, How the West Was Won, and Ishi: The Last of His Tribe in 1978. He guest-starred in Death Valley Days, Gunsmoke, Bonanza, and The High Chaparral. Martínez's guest roles in non-western series included Quincy, M.E., Northern Exposure, L.A. Law, Marcus Welby, M.D., Dynasty, Ironside, and opposite Bill Cosby in The Bill Cosby Show.

On stage, Martínez was an original cast member for Zoot Suit, which broke sales records for live theater when it opened in Los Angeles in July 1978. In 1988, he co-starred in Summer and Smoke with Christine Lahti and Christopher Reeve at the Ahmanson Theatre in Los Angeles. Martínez's last film was Castingx, a 2005 Dutch movie directed by Ad Bol.

== Personal life ==
He lived in semiretirement in the Netherlands since circa 2002 or 2003. Joaquin Martínez died from pancreatic cancer at his home in Everdingen, the Netherlands, on January 3, 2012, at the age of 81. He was survived by his wife, Marja Valkestijn; daughter, Jennifer; son, Christopher; stepson, Sjoerd; and his former wife, Mary Preston.

== Filmography ==
- Tlayucan (1962) – Amigo de Eufemio
- El señor Tormenta (1963)
- Tesoro de mentiras (1963)
- Pedro Páramo (1967) – Abundio
- Alma Grande en el desierto (1967)
- El asesino se embarca (1967) – Pedro
- The Bandits (1967)
- The Stalking Moon (1968) – Julio
- Lauro Puñales (1969) – Matías
- Moonfire (1970) – Lazaro
- Jeremiah Johnson (1972) – Paints His Shirt Red
- Joe Kidd (1972) – Manolo
- Ulzana's Raid (1972) – Ulzana
- Executive Action (1973) – Art Mendoza
- Zandy's Bride (1974) – Arvis Demas (uncredited)
- He Is My Brother (1975) – The Kahuna
- Who'll Stop the Rain (1978) – Angel
- Meatballs Part II (1984) – Indian Chief
- Flashpoint (1984) – Pedroza
- Little Treasure (1985) – Market Voice #2
- Persecución en Las Vegas: 'Volvere' (1987) – Tony
- Revenge (1990) – Mauro
- House of Cards (1993) – Selord
- The House of the Spirits (1993) – Segundo
- The Cowboy Way (1994) – Nacho Salazar
- The Odd Couple II (1998) – Truck Driver
- Die Another Day (2002) – Old Man in Cigar Factory
- Castingx (2005) – Postman (final film role)
