= Renate Blume =

German actress (born 1944)

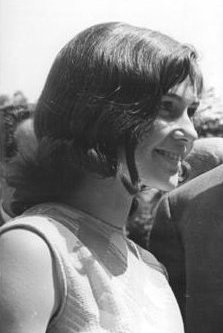
- Blume at the KVIFF, 1964
- Born: 3 May 1944 (age 82); Bad Wildungen, Germany
- Occupation: Actress
- Years active: 1964-present

Renate Blume (born 3 May 1944) is a German actress. She has appeared in more than 70 films and television shows since 1964. She was a member of the jury at the 14th Moscow International Film Festival.

From 1969 until 1975 she was married to film director Frank Beyer. Their son, Alexander, also became an actor. In 1981 she married Dean Reed, an American actor, singer and songwriter living in East Germany.

== Selected filmography ==
- Divided Heaven (1964)
- Frozen Flashes (1967)
- Ulzana (1974)
- Archiv des Todes (1980)
