= Geronimo: An American Legend =

1993 film directed by Walter Hill

- Theatrical release poster
- Directed by: Walter Hill
- Screenplay by: John Milius; Larry Gross
- Story by: John Milius
- Produced by: Walter Hill; Neil Canton
- Starring: Jason Patric; Robert Duvall; Gene Hackman; Wes Studi
- Cinematography: Lloyd Ahern
- Edited by: Freeman Davies; Carmel Davies; Donn Aron
- Music by: Ry Cooder
- Production company: Columbia Pictures
- Distributed by: Columbia Pictures
- Release date: December 10, 1993
- Running time: 115 minutes
- Country: United States
- Language: English
- Budget: $35 million
- Box office: $18.6 million

Geronimo: An American Legend is a 1993 historical Western film starring Wes Studi, Jason Patric, Gene Hackman, Robert Duvall, and Matt Damon in an early role. The film, which was directed by Walter Hill, is based on a screenplay by John Milius. It is a fictionalized account of the Apache Wars and how First Lieutenant Charles B. Gatewood convinced Apache leader Geronimo to surrender in 1886.

== Plot ==
The film loosely follows the events leading up to the surrender of Geronimo in 1886. A respected healer, Geronimo and his fellow Apache reluctantly agree to settle on a reservation established by the American government in accordance with the Indian Removal Act. The tribe does its best to assimilate, but many Apache struggle to abandon their traditional way of life while the government fails to honor its promise to keep American settlers from encroaching on tribal lands.

Geronimo finally commits himself to armed resistance when soldiers of the United States Cavalry accompanied by Indian fighter Al Sieber slaughter a band of Apache after discovering them practicing their "heathen" faith in secret. Geronimo forms a ragtag militia, who humiliate the army by evading capture time and time again while carrying out well-planned guerilla attacks. Lieutenant Charles B. Gatewood, a West Point graduate, is charged with capturing Geronimo with the assistance of Sieber and Britton Davis, an ambitious but inexperienced cavalryman.

Gatewood is torn between his grudging respect for Geronimo and his duty to his country. His superior, Brigadier General George Crook, has nothing but admiration for Geronimo and contempt for the self-serving actions of his government. Geronimo eventually surrenders to Crook but later escapes, this time persuading more than half the reservation to join him. Crook later resigns in disgrace and is replaced by Nelson A. Miles. The new commander orders that the remaining Apache be punished as a message to Geronimo's followers. He also decides that Gatewood and his fellow officers should be removed from the field and replaced with men loyal to him.

General Miles, realizing that in spite of his tactics he too is not any closer to capturing Geronimo, approaches Gatewood with an offer: use his relationship with Geronimo to find the warrior and convince him to surrender. He orders Gatewood to offer Geronimo a sentence of two years' imprisonment in Florida with the offer of fresh land in Arizona and two mules for every warrior who surrenders. Gatewood retorts to Miles that they both know the government has no intention of honoring this agreement. Miles offers Gatewood 100 men to take into the field, but the younger officer counters with a request for one Apache scout and three men of his choosing.

Gatewood, Sieber, Davis and the Apache Chato set off to find Geronimo but instead discover a village of slaughtered Yaqui. Gatewood tasks Sieber and Chato with finding the scalp hunters responsible. They stop at a saloon where the hunters are dealing with a Comanchero interested in buying the scalps. When the hunters try to take Chato's scalp as well, Gatewood arrives and attempts to intervene and offers them money to return to Texas. The hunters mock Gatewood as a coward and an Indian lover and a shoot-out ensues. Sieber is shot and mortally wounded, his last words pointing to his surprise at dying in the act of trying to save an Apache.

Gatewood, Davis and Chato carry on the hunt for Geronimo and finally reach his camp. Geronimo asks Gatewood if the young officer will break his word like those who came before him. Gatewood decides to be honest and tells Geronimo what Miles will do to the surviving Apache should he continue fighting. Faced with the grave reality, Geronimo makes peace with Gatewood and surrenders along with his men to General Miles. Miles then arranges for Gatewood, whom he considers to be insubordinate and an embarrassment to the army, to spend the rest of his career in a dull, dead-end post commanding a garrison in rural Wyoming.

The final ignominy befalls Chato and the other Apache scouts, who are disarmed at gunpoint and thrown into prison. Davis, angered by what he regards as a betrayal of everything he believed in, confronts Miles. The general dismisses him, remarking that Davis is a foolish idealist and even questioning his integrity by implying that anyone who takes the word of a "savage" over a white man is not a true American. Davis decides to resign rather than continue to serve under Miles. Chato approaches Geronimo and tells him he was right to fight the white man. Geronimo counsels his remaining renegades not to fall out with one another as there are so few of them remaining. He warns them of what lies ahead. Geronimo lives on for another twenty-two years, never allowed to return home and forced to endure the humiliation of being displayed as a living trophy of American conquest while the Apache are left to fall into poverty and dependence on the government for their survival.

== Cast ==
- Wes Studi as Geronimo
- Jason Patric as 1st Lieutenant Charles B. Gatewood
- Robert Duvall as Chief of Scouts Al Sieber
- Gene Hackman as Brigadier General George Crook
- Matt Damon as 2nd Lieutenant Britton Davis
- Pato Hoffmann as The Dreamer
- Rodney A. Grant as Mangas
- Kevin Tighe as Brigadier General Nelson A. Miles
- Steve Reevis as Chato
- Carlos Palomino as Sergeant Turkey
- Mark Boone Junior as Afraid Miner
- Victor Aaron as Ulzana
- Stuart Proud Eagle Grant as Sergeant Dutchy
- Scott Wilson as Redondo
- Stephen McHattie as Schoonover
- John Finn as Captain Hentig
- Lee de Broux as City Marshal Joe Hawkins
- Rino Thunder as Old Nana

== Production ==
=== Development ===
==== Carolco ====
Walter Hill had a development deal at Carolco. They approached him wanting to make a Western that focused on an Indian and Hill was enthusiastic. He initially considering doing a movie on Crazy Horse "but for various reasons I thought it was a little too difficult." Eventually Geronimo was selected. "I've been reading the history of the West for my entire life", Hill says, "and I felt the Geronimo story had never really been told." John Milius was hired to write a draft. He was working on it in 1989. Larry Gross wrote a diary on the filming of Geronimo. He recalls reading Milius' script in 1988 when Hill was working on Johnny Handsome. "I like Geronimo just as he was, a human predator", said Milius.

"Geronimo was a man who saw the history of his people wiped out", added Milius. "I love the Apaches and Geronimo was the ultimate Apache. But Geronimo was more than an Apache he was the essence of a misfit rebel and he would never give up. He was a troublemaker and I understand that. Even among his own people he was a trouble maker." Hill said the title of the film should have been The Geronimo War. "The conception was you make the film from the last time he came in and broke off and was sent away", he said. "The last time he broke off the reservations. This had been a recurring pattern. I thought that would be more accurate." "We had a really good script, but I couldn't make any headway with it", said Hill later. In 1992 the movie was transferred from Carolco to Columbia.

==== Columbia ====
The film was greenlit by Columbia's head of production Mark Canton, whose brother Neil would be the film's producer. It was taken at the time when westerns were experiencing a revival in popularity in the wake of the success of Dances with Wolves, The Last of the Mohicans and Unforgiven. "All of these Westerns are riding the backs of those", said Hill (other Westerns which would come out around this time included Tombstone, Wyatt Earp, The Quick and the Dead, Bad Girls, Maverick and Lightning Jack). However, the production at Columbia required script changes. According to Hill, Milius' screenplay was more inclusive of Geronimo's early years and Milius was reluctant to revise it so he had it rewritten by himself and Larry Gross, who worked on the project from six to eight months in 1992.

"This movie certainly presents a heroic view of Geronimo", said Hill. "At the same time, it suggests that the times were complicated ... The audience doesn't go to a movie for a history lesson; it wants entertainment. At the same time, they don't want something that trashes history; so it's a delicate line." "Movies tend to develop a life of their own", added Hill. "We had to deal with Geronimo a lot better than what our original intention was. The more we found out, the more interesting the story became."

Among the changes were removing a sequence (based on historical fact) where Geromino surrendered to General George Crook in Mexico in March 1886, pledging to return under escort to Arizona, where he would be disarmed and sent to exile in Florida; two nights later Geronimo got drunk and took off into the mountains again, going on a five-month rampage until he surrendered once more. Milius said he thought the script was changed because "We don't want to see our heroes getting drunk and running off. We want to see them as wonderful freedom fighters." "History is fascinating, but history is not a good dramatist", said Hill.

The film's narrator, Second Lt. Britton Davis, was a real officer who participated in these events. In 1929, he published a memoir of the time, called The Truth About Geronimo. The narration uses many quotations from Davis that featured in his memoir, like his description of the endless search for Geronimo's camp: "At times it seemed we were chasing a spirit more than a man." However it did not include Davis's personal assessment of Geronimo: "This Indian was a thoroughly vicious, intractable and treacherous man. His only redeeming traits were courage and determination. His word, no matter how earnestly pledged, was worthless." "It's like Pat Garrett and Billy the Kid", said Hill. "These characters are real, but certainly we're allowing legend to serve the truth. If I was doing this as a PBS documentary, I would do it a lot differently." For instance, the script used the Turkey Creek massacre as the reason for Geronimo going off the reservation when it happened five years earlier. "No, it's not accurate", admitted Hill. "Is it authentic? Yes, it is."

"I don't think I ever had a movie where I was so concerned about trying to be fair", said Hill. "Usually you're just trying to be dramatic and you've got good guys and bad guys. In this movie, you try to valorize both sides. At the same time you have to be rigorous enough to say that both sides did terrible things; they did heroic things, they did terrible things. To suggest that there were only terrible things is wrong and to suggest that it was only heroic was wrong, too. At the same time you're trying to make it a theatrical two-hour movie." Hill thought the cavalry officers "were the most sympathetic to the Indians of the Southwest. They knew them and understood that what was happening was a tragedy. They understood that the imposition of the reserve system was going to have tragic consequences. Yet, they were the ones being asked to carry out this policy. They were the ones being asked to fight, so there was this kind of conflict between feelings and duty."

=== Casting ===
Hill says when he started pushing the script there was pressure to cast a white actor in the lead. He said: "The first thing I heard was, 'Why can't we have X or Y Caucasian put on makeup and play Geronimo? If you do that, we'll make the movie.' I said, 'You can't do that.' They wouldn't think of having a Caucasian actor play a black leader. The implications are just staggering ... That kind of casting became unthinkable after Dances With Wolves. When the script got active again last fall, there was no question that we would have an Indian actor in the lead."

Wes Studi was cast in the lead after impressing in The Last of the Mohicans (1992). The other star attached early on was Jason Patric, who Gross described as "a young actor everybody in Hollywood believes in, but who does few pictures and has never had a hit." He was cast in February 1993. Gross says that although Studi and Patric were cast, "Columbia found ways of not letting Walter start the picture ... there is endless talk about casting and the script."

In April 1993, Gene Hackman and Robert Duvall committed to the film, making it seem more likely that it would get made. On April 27 1993, Gross wrote in his diary, "more than any movie Walter has done in the 11 years I've known him, and certainly more than on our three previous films together, he not only knows how to make this film, but is including far more of himself – his heart and soul and his convictions about life, so to speak." Gross added that "I think his inclinations and dispositions match the story and the material. His instincts will serve him. Walter deeply loves these nineteenth century people in a way I'm not sure he ever loves his modern characters. And his aesthetic commitments to reticence and suggestion in characterisation is truer to these people than in some other cases." The part of Al Sieber was expanded when Duvall was cast in the role. Under the deal, Duvall's production company, Butcher's Run Films, signed an arrangement with Columbia.

Duvall later called the film "a paid vacation", adding that he loved the role of Sieber. "He was one of the top Indian scouts and an interesting enough guy that you could do a whole movie about him, because he could out-track, out-scout, out-ride and out-hunt most Indians. They both feared him and liked him." Gross said "I can truthfully say that we've had fewer bad suggestions from the studio on this film than on any I've worked on." An original draft of the script included scenes with Charles B. Gatewood's wife Georgia McCulloh Gatewood, but these were cut out for budgetary reasons.

=== Filming ===
Filming started in May 1993. The film was shot in Utah, Tucson, Arizona, and Culver City, California. Filming locations in Utah include Professor Valley, Onion Creek, Potash, Dead Horse Point, Needles Overlook, Bates Ranch, Lawson Ranch, and Ruby Ranch Road.

On May 9, Gross wrote that "Walter has some leeriness about Jason Patric's proclivity for a lot of takes." He also wrote that "grappling with Jason's angst and assessing the strengths and weaknesses of his acting method is Walter's biggest 'problem' on the movie – and also, of course, his richest creative opportunity. Jason's potential is so enormous that it is frustrating not to have full, unstopped access to it. The name we can't but help invoke in comparison is Brando." Gross says there were some concerns from the studio that the Indians were not sympathetic enough. "But we're not telling the story of the spiritual Sioux", wrote Gross. "We're telling the story of the Apache; the Spartans, not the Athenians. Their art was war."

The character of Sieber was meant to ride off into the sunset at the end of the movie but during filming Hill felt that the running time was going to be too long and so decided to kill off the character. "If I'd known I was going to die I might not have done the movie", said Duvall. "I've died nine times in films." Gross says the scene where Sieber runs into the bounty hunters was Hill's homage to Cormac McCarthy's novel Blood Meridian. Gross says that Hill put a dance scene in the movie because John Ford once gave him advice that "you have to put songs and musical numbers in these things."

Hill shot the film with an unusual combination of a wide screen and long, telescopic lenses to produce huge landscape filled with small, but carefully defined, human figures. "I also thought – this is a little more metaphysical, I suppose — that somehow looking back it would all look a little more dreamlike", Hill said. "With this kind of tobacco look that we use – I used tobacco filters a lot – I thought that it might seem like you were watching something that was actually taking place 100 years ago."

== Reception ==
Walter Hill later expressed dissatisfaction with the title:

It should have been called The Geronimo War ... It's as much about the Army as it is Geronimo. That came out of my reading of historical accounts, and realizing that so much of what we think we know about the Indian campaigns is wrong. The Army is generally depicted as the enemy of the Apache, but in many cases, the people who were most sympathetic to their plight were those soldiers.

Another film on Geronimo came out around the same time, the made-for-TV movie Geronimo, which premiered on Ted Turner's movie channel TNT. It was produced by Norman Jewison who said "We've got a subject whose life was full enough to warrant several films."

Hill said of the competing films:

I don’t think there are a hell of a lot of movies where you can take basically the same story, show it to 50 million people and bring yours out a week later and think that you’re going to do great. What can you say, ‘My Geronimo has better locations?’

=== Awards ===
At the 66th Academy Awards, the film was nominated for the Academy Award for Best Sound (Chris Carpenter, Doug Hemphill, Bill W. Benton and Lee Orloff), but lost to Jurassic Park.

=== Critical ===
The film received mixed reviews from critics but was praised by Native American groups. Philip French of London's The Observer called it one of the greatest Westerns of all time. On Rotten Tomatoes, the film holds a rating of 50% with an average score of 6.3/10 based on 22 reviews. The site's critical consensus reads: "Geronimo: An American Legend fails to stir the soul, though its sweeping visuals and historical ambitions mark an intelligent change of pace for director Walter Hill." Metacritic, which uses a weighted average, assigned the film a score of 58 out of 100, based on 22 critics, indicating "mixed or average" critics.

Audiences polled by CinemaScore gave the film an average grade of "B" on an A+ to F scale.

=== Box office ===
On December 17, 1993, Gross wrote in his diary that "the opening numbers are not good and I feel the dull roar of Geronimo not making money at the box office."The film was a box office bomb, earning only $18 million on a $35 million budget . The movie dropped to number 7 the following week.

Hill blamed this poor reception on the screening of the TV movie. Hill said, "I don't think there are a hell of a lot of movies where you can take basically the same story, show it to 50 million people and bring yours out a week later and think that you're going to do great. What can you say, `My Geronimo has better locations?' " The film was admired by Quentin Tarantino, who said: "I thought with Geronimo [Hill] went to a really fantastic place. Everybody talked about how boring it was. But, I didn't. I thought he made a really great classic Western and America just wasn't worthy of the privilege."

== See also ==
- Geronimo (1993 TV film)
