= Ulzana's Raid =

1972 film by Robert Aldrich

- Original film poster
- Directed by: Robert Aldrich
- Written by: Alan Sharp
- Produced by: Carter DeHaven
- Starring: Burt Lancaster; Bruce Davison; Richard Jaeckel; Jorge Luke; Joaquín Martínez
- Cinematography: Joseph Biroc
- Edited by: Michael Luciano
- Music by: Frank De Vol
- Production companies: De Haven Productions; The Associates & Aldrich Company
- Distributed by: Universal Pictures
- Release date: October 27, 1972
- Running time: 103 minutes
- Country: United States
- Language: English
- Budget: $2.8 million
- Box office: 414,559 admissions (France)

Ulzana's Raid is a 1972 American revisionist Western film directed by Robert Aldrich from a screenplay by Alan Sharp, and starring Burt Lancaster, Bruce Davison, Richard Jaeckel and Joaquin Martinez. It portrays a brutal raid by Chiricahua Apaches against American settlers in 1880s Arizona.

The film was released by Universal Pictures on October 27, 1972, and was well-received by critics. The bleak and nihilistic tone of U.S. troops chasing an elusive, merciless enemy has been seen as allegory to the United States' participation in the Vietnam War.

== Plot ==
1885, Arizona. Following mistreatment by Indian agency authorities, Ulzana breaks out of the San Carlos Indian Reservation with a small Chiricahua war party. When news reaches Fort Lowell, the commanding officer sends riders out to alert the local settlers, but both troopers are ambushed separately; one is dragged away, while the other kills the woman he is escorting and then himself. The Apaches then extract and play catch with his liver. The woman's husband, who stayed behind to protect his farm, is captured and tortured to death. McIntosh, an aging U.S. Army scout, is ordered to bring in Ulzana. Joining him will be a few dozen soldiers led by an inexperienced lieutenant, Garnett DeBuin, a veteran Cavalry sergeant, and Ke-Ni-Tay, an Apache scout. Ke-Ni-Tay knows Ulzana because their wives are sisters.

The cavalry troop soon discovers the brutal activities of the Apache war party. The soldiers know they are facing a merciless enemy with far better local skills. DeBuin is shocked by the cruelty and harshness he sees, because it conflicts strongly with his Christian morality and view of humanity. After failing to find Ulzana, McIntosh and Ke-Ni-Tay consider how to outwit their enemy. DeBuin remains cautious and mistrustful of Ke-Ni-Tay, though, because Ulzana did not let him join his war party.

Ulzana and his warriors decide to continue on foot to tire out the pursuing cavalry, while their horses are circuitously led back the other way. However, after Ke-Ni-Tay notices that the tracks are of unladen ponies, McIntosh leads an ambush that kills the horses and their two Apache escorts, one of whom was Ulzana's son. Despite angry protestations, DeBuin forbids his men from mutilating the dead boy.

The war party attack another farm, burning the homesteader to death and seizing two horses. McIntosh realizes that the remaining Apaches physically and psychologically need horses and will try to obtain them by raiding the troop. A woman at the burned-out farm, instead of being murdered following her gang rape, was left alive but injured so the cavalry will be forced to send her to the fort with an escort. By splitting the troop, Ulzana hopes to successfully attack the escort and seize its horses. McIntosh suggests a decoy plan to make Ulzana falsely believe that his tactics are successful.

Ulzana's warriors ambush the small escort detachment obtaining all of its horses and killing the sergeant and his soldiers before DeBuin can arrive with the rest of his force. McIntosh is left mortally wounded. Only the woman survives unharmed, though now apparently crazed by her experiences. Ke-Ni-Tay scatters the captured horses just as bugle calls from the cavalry ineptly alert the Apaches to DeBuin's approach. Ulzana flees on foot as the remnants of his band are killed. Ke-Ni-Tay confronts him and shows him the Army bugle taken from the body of his son. Ulzana puts down his weapons and sings his death song before the Apache scout kills him. A corporal suggests that Ulzana, or at least his head, should be taken back to the fort. DeBuin, now hardened by what he has witnessed during the mission, sternly orders him to be buried. Ke-Ni-Tay insists on carrying out the task himself. The surviving troopers led by DeBuin pack up to leave, but McIntosh knows that he will not survive the journey back to the fort, so chooses to stay behind to die alone.

== Cast ==
- Burt Lancaster as McIntosh
- Bruce Davison as Lt. Garnett DeBuin
- Jorge Luke as Ke-Ni-Tay
- Richard Jaeckel as the Sergeant
- Joaquin Martinez as Ulzana
- Lloyd Bochner as Capt. Charles Gates
- Karl Swenson as Willy Rukeyser
- Douglass Watson as Maj. Cartwright
- Dran Hamilton as Mrs. Riordan
- John Pearce as Corporal
- Gladys Holland as Mrs. Rukeyser
- Margaret Fairchild as Mrs. Abbie Ginsford
- Aimee Eccles as McIntosh's Indian woman
- Richard Bull as Ginsford
- Otto Reichow as 'Dutch' Steegmeyer
- George Aguilar as Indian Brave
- Dean Smith as Horowitz
- Larry Randles as Mulkearn
- Nick Cravat as Trooper
- Richard Farnsworth as Miller
- Hal Baylor as Curtis

== Production ==
=== Writing ===
The film is an original screenplay by Alan Sharp, who said he was inspired by John Ford's 1956 Western The Searchers, because he regarded it as "the best film I have ever seen". Sharp later described Ulzana's Raid as:

Apart from being my sincere homage to Ford [...] an attempt to express allegorically the malevolence of the world and the terror mortals feel in the face of it. We all have our own notions of what constitutes the ultimate in fear, from personal phobias to periods in history. [...] Three historical landscapes that I shudder most to consider are the Third Reich, Turkey during the First World War, and the American Southwest during the years 1860–86. [...] In Ulzana's Raid I am not intent on presenting a reasoned analysis of the relationship between the aboriginie and the colonizer. The events described in the film are accurate in the sense they have factual equivalents, but the final consideration was to present an allegory in whose enlarged features we might perceive the lineaments of our own drama, caricatured, but not falsified. [...] The Ulzana of the Ulzana's Raid is not the Chiricahua Apache of history, whose raid was more protracted and ruthless and daring than the one I had written about. He is the expression of my idea of the Apache as the spirit of the land, the manifestation of its hostility and harshness.

Lancaster later said in 1972 that in his entire career, the only "first screenplays" that he really liked were Birdman of Alcatraz and Ulzana's Raid.

Aldrich later claimed, "From the time we started to the time we finished the picture, I'd say 50, 60 percent of it [the script] was changed. Alan Sharp, the writer, was very amenable and terribly helpful. And terribly prolific. He can write 25 pages a day. He couldn't agree more with my political viewpoint—so that was no problem. And fortunately, Lancaster and I felt pretty much the same about the picture. It was good that I had support from Sharp and Lancaster, because I don't have the highest regard for Carter DeHaven, the producer."

=== Casting ===
This was the first time Burt Lancaster and Robert Aldrich had worked together since Vera Cruz (1954). Aldrich said Lancaster's character, John McIntosh, was named after John McIntire, the actor who played the Indian scout Al Sieber in the film Apache he directed in 1954. It was an "inside joke ... I'm not sure that Alan Sharp ever knew just why we did that."

=== Filming ===
The film was shot on location in the southeast of Tucson, Arizona, at the Coronado National Forest, and in Nogales, as well as in the Valley of Fire State Park, Nevada.

== Alternate versions ==
Two cuts of the film were made because Burt Lancaster helped to produce the movie. The American release was edited under the supervision of Aldrich, while the European version was overseen by Lancaster. Although the overall running times are similar, several differences are seen between the two cuts, including several complete scenes found in only one of the versions. An unauthorized version compiled by a German TV station in 1986 combined all scenes from both versions, with a runtime of 111 min.

== Reception ==
Although it was not a commercial success, Aldrich said he was "very proud" of the film. Critics such as Gene Siskel wrote that the film was one of the 10 best of 1972. Vincent Canby of the New York Times also said it was one of the best films of the year.

=== Later reputation ===
Although the film is considered to be a revisionist Western, it is not through the sympathetic portrayal of Native Americans that is so common in this genre; it is because of its allegorical message about America's conduct in the war in Vietnam at that time. American film critic and professor Emanuel Levy has called Ulzana's Raid one of the best Westerns of the 1970s, saying it "is also one of the most underestimated pictures of vet[eran] director Robert Aldrich, better known for his sci-fi and horror flicks, such as Kiss Me Deadly and What Ever Happened to Baby Jane."

Quentin Tarantino called it "hands down Aldrich’s best film of the '70s, as well as being one of the greatest Westerns of the '70s. One of the things that makes the movie so remarkable is it isn’t just a Western; it combines the two genres that Aldrich was most known for, Westerns and war films."

On the review aggregator website Rotten Tomatoes, 90% of 10 critics' reviews are positive, with an average rating of 7/10.

== See also ==
- Major Dundee, a 1965 Western by Sam Peckinpah and starring Charlton Heston and Richard Harris
- The Stalking Moon, a 1968 more conventional American Western concerning an elusive merciless Apache enemy
- Soldier Blue, a 1970 American revisionist Western
- Ulzana, a 1974 East German Western film about Ulzana shot in Romania and Uzbekistan
