= Battle of Pecos River =

1864 battle of the Navajo Wars in New Mexico

- Part of the Navajo Wars
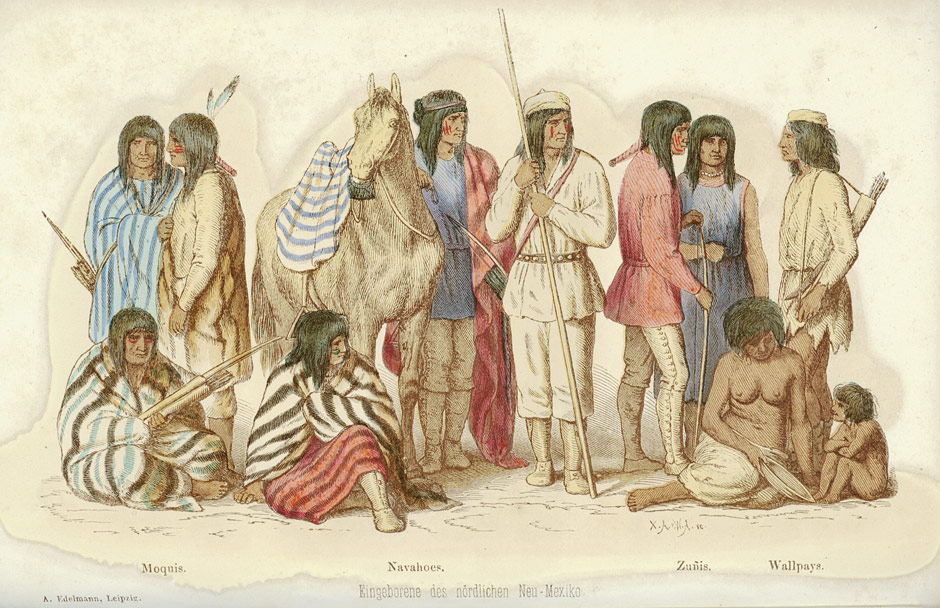
- "The indigenous people of northern New Mexico" by Balduin Möllhausen, 1861.
Date	January 4, 1864
Location	Pecos River, New Mexico
Result	United States victory

Belligerents
United States; Mescalero	Navajo

Commanders and leaders
(United States) Charles Newbold (United States) Lorenzo Labadie; Chief Cadete	unknown

Strength
15 cavalry ~10 infantry ~60 Mescalero scouts	~100 warriors

Casualties and losses
None	40 killed 25 wounded

The Battle of Pecos River was fought in 1864 during the Navajo Wars. United States Army troops and Apache Scouts defeated a force of Navajo warriors next to the Pecos River in New Mexico. It is notable for being one of the many Indian war battles involving the California Column.

== Battle ==
Indian Agent Lorenzo Labadie commanded a Mescalero Apache force of about sixty scouts and Chief Cadete which tracked a Navajo war party of 100 strong south along the Pecos after they raided livestock at Bosque Redondo reservation. Dozens of mules and horses were taken by the Navajo, but they were closely pursued. The Navajo eventually realized that they couldn't escape without leaving the livestock, so they chose to fight and took up positions along the river to wait for the Americans and Apaches. By then fifteen soldiers of the 2nd California Cavalry along with at least ten men of the 5th Infantry had arrived to reinforce Labadie, they were under the command of Lieutenant Charles Newbold. It was 11:00 am and the temperature was around ten degrees below zero when the Americans discovered the enemy waiting for them in a small valley. The Navajo opened fire at eighty yards and the Americans and Apaches quickly took cover and began returning fire. Newbold then ordered his soldiers to take up their revolvers and charge which according to Newbold "went down like a small tornado. Nine Navajos were killed in the attack.

Skirmishing ensued for several hours after and lasted all day until sundown. The engagement took place mostly at long-range meaning that it was hard for both sides to see each other and the severe winter cold led to frostbite which slowed the soldier's and scout's ability to reload. Because of this the Apaches eventually abandoned their rifles and armed themselves with bows and arrows. The Americans also carried two Colt six-shooters each. Fighting ended when the Navajo fled, the soldiers estimated that forty Navajo warriors were killed and left on the battlefield and at least twenty-five others were wounded. They also reported that around twenty-five others escaped. After a long and bloody fight not a single American or Apache was wounded. Fifty horses and mules were recovered. Less than two weeks later Colonel Kit Carson would lead American troops in the Fall of Canyon de Chelly which led to the Long Walk to Fort Sumner
