= Mogollon =

Mogollon may refer to:

== Anthropology ==
- Mogollon culture (c. 200–1500 CE), a culture in what is now Northern Mexico and the Southwestern United States

== Cryptozoology ==
- Mogollon Monster, a legendary creature that has been discussed in accounts from central and eastern Arizona along the Mogollon Rim

== Geography ==
- Mogollón, Los Santos, Panama
- Mogollon Baldy, one of the tallest peaks in the Mogollon Mountains in New Mexico
- Mogollon Mountains or Mogollon Range, a mountain range in southwestern New Mexico
- Mogollon, New Mexico, a ghost town located in the Mogollon Mountains in New Mexico
- Mogollon Plateau, part of the Colorado plateau
- Mogollon Rim, an escarpment in Arizona which is the southwestern edge of the Colorado Plateau

== People ==
- Alfón Gil de Mogollón, late 14th-century/early 15th-century Spanish nobleman
- Pedro Gil de Mogollón, 14th-century Spanish nobleman
- Juan Ignacio Flores Mogollón, Spanish Governor of New Mexico from 1712 to 1715
- Oscar Mogollon (1940–2009), education visionary of the late 20th century
