= Ulzana =

Tsokanende Apache war chief (c. 1821–1909)

Ulzana (c. 1821 – 1909, also known as Josanni, Jolsanie or Ozaní’ – ″Tanned buckskin″ or Bį-sópàn – ″Big Buckskin″), was a Tsokanende Apache war chief, brother of Chihuahua.

== Biography ==
Ulzana is best known for leading a raid in 1885 (which inspired the film Ulzana's Raid (1972)) through Arizona and New Mexico with only 11 Mogollon warriors, riding 1200 miles, killing 36 Pindah and Mexicans, killing many settlers, including women and children, stealing stock, and engaging in rape and mutilation of civilian captives.

One of the bandits was killed by San Carlos Apache, and went safely to Mexico in the last days of December. Ulzana surrendered, along with his brother Chihuahua and old Nana, on 3 March 1886, when 77 Apache (15 warriors, 33 women, and 29 children) made their entrance into Fort Bowie to be arrested.

Despite the crimes they had committed, they were not hanged, but rather were held in the reservation, and made no further attempts at escape. Ulzana died in 1909 in captivity, in what may have been considerable by Apache standards to have been a death in submission, having surrendered himself to captivity some years prior, even in light of the brutal raids they praised through their oral traditions.

== Movies ==
- Ulzana's Raid (1972)
- Apachen (1973)
- Ulzana (film) a 1974 East German western film shot in Romania and Uzbekistan with Gojko Mitic
