= Apache scout =

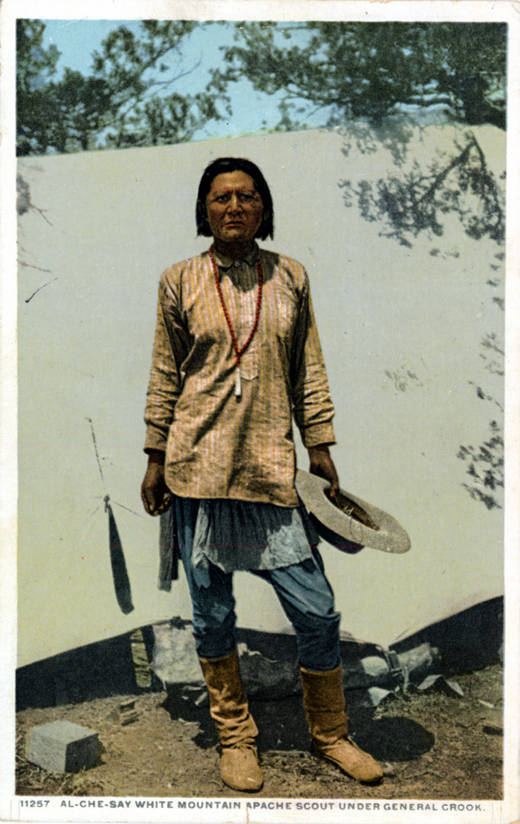
Al-Che-Say White Mountain Apache Scout under General Crook

An Apache scout is a member of an Apache tribe who is trained in reconnaissance, either for hunting, defense of the people, or during times of war.

== Background ==
Only Lipan, Chiricahua and Mescaleros have, or have historically had, scout societies. The scouts' original purpose was to protect the people in their clan from enemies, to locate game and new campsites. This traditional role in community is different from that of the military scouts hired by the United States Army during the Indian Wars.

== Training ==
Scouts traditionally train in an intense process that can last over ten years. Traditional skills to be mastered include tracking and hunting, wilderness survival, and cultural knowledge unique to their particular band.
