= Marion Perry Maus =

United States Army general

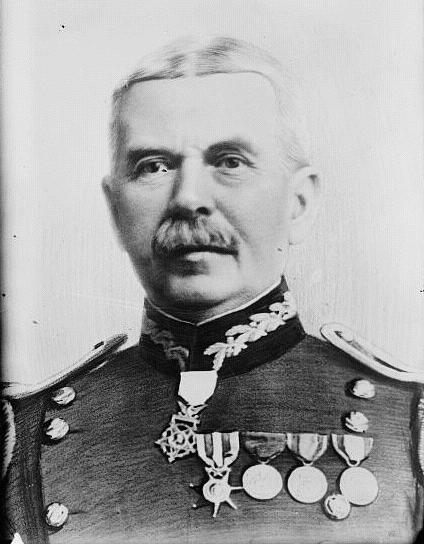
- Marion Perry Maus
- Born: August 25, 1850; Burnt Mills, Maryland, US
- Died: February 9, 1930 (aged 79); New Windsor, Maryland, US
- Burial place: Arlington National Cemetery
- Military career
- Allegiance: United States
- Branch: United States Army
- Service years: 1874–1913
- Rank: Brigadier general
- Unit: 1st Infantry Regiment
- Commands: 20th Infantry Regiment; Department of the Columbia
- Conflicts: American Indian Wars; Spanish–American War; Philippine Insurrection
- Awards: Medal of Honor; Silver Star

Marion Perry Maus (August 25, 1850 – February 2, 1930) was a United States Army brigadier general who was a recipient of the Medal of Honor for valor in action on January 11, 1886, in the Sierra Madre Mountains, Mexico. An 1874 graduate of West Point, he served in three wars and in multiple commands in the Army during his long career, retiring in 1913.

== Early life and service in the American West ==
Born at Burnt Mills, Maryland, on August 25, 1850, he was appointed to West Point from Montgomery County, Maryland, graduating in 1874. He was commissioned in the Infantry branch and assigned to the western frontier. He served as chief of Army Scouts under Col. Nelson Appleton Miles in the pursuit and capture of Chief Joseph of the Nez Perce in 1877. He was promoted to first lieutenant in September 1879 and served in Texas in 1880 and Arizona in 1882. In 1885, as a commander of Apache scouts, he took part in the expedition into Mexico in pursuit of Geronimo and for conduct in that action he received the Medal of Honor. He was officially awarded the medal in November 1894. He was promoted to captain in November 1890, and saw action against the Sioux Indians in 1890–94.

== Medal of Honor citation ==
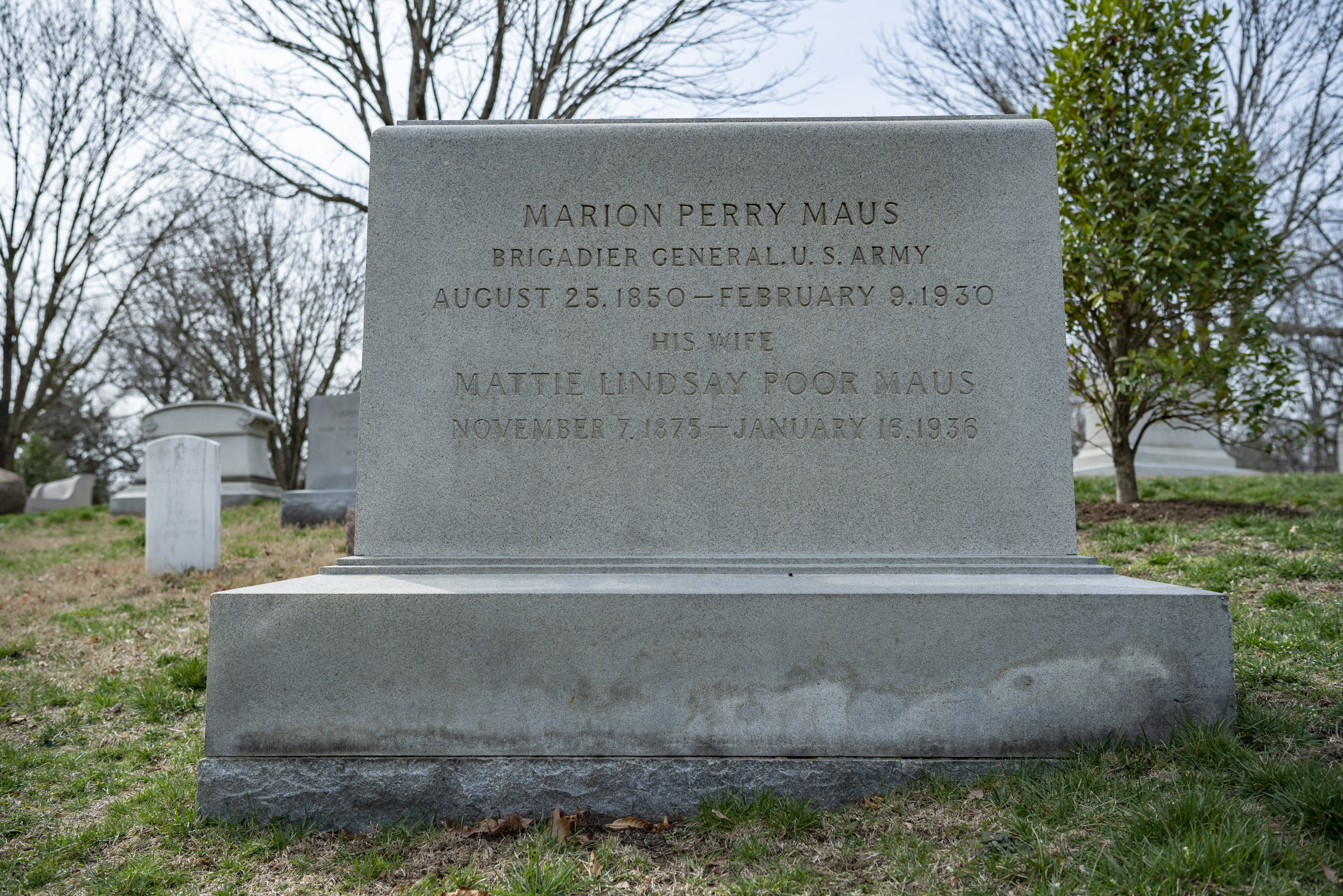
Grave at Arlington National Cemetery

Rank and organization: First Lieutenant, 1st U.S. Infantry. Place and date: At Sierra Madre Mountains, Mex., 11 January 1886. Entered service at: Tennallytown, Montgomery County, Md. Birth: Burnt Mills, Md. Date of issue: 27 November 1894.

Citation: "Most distinguished gallantry in action with hostile Apaches led by Geronimo and Natchez."

== Later career ==
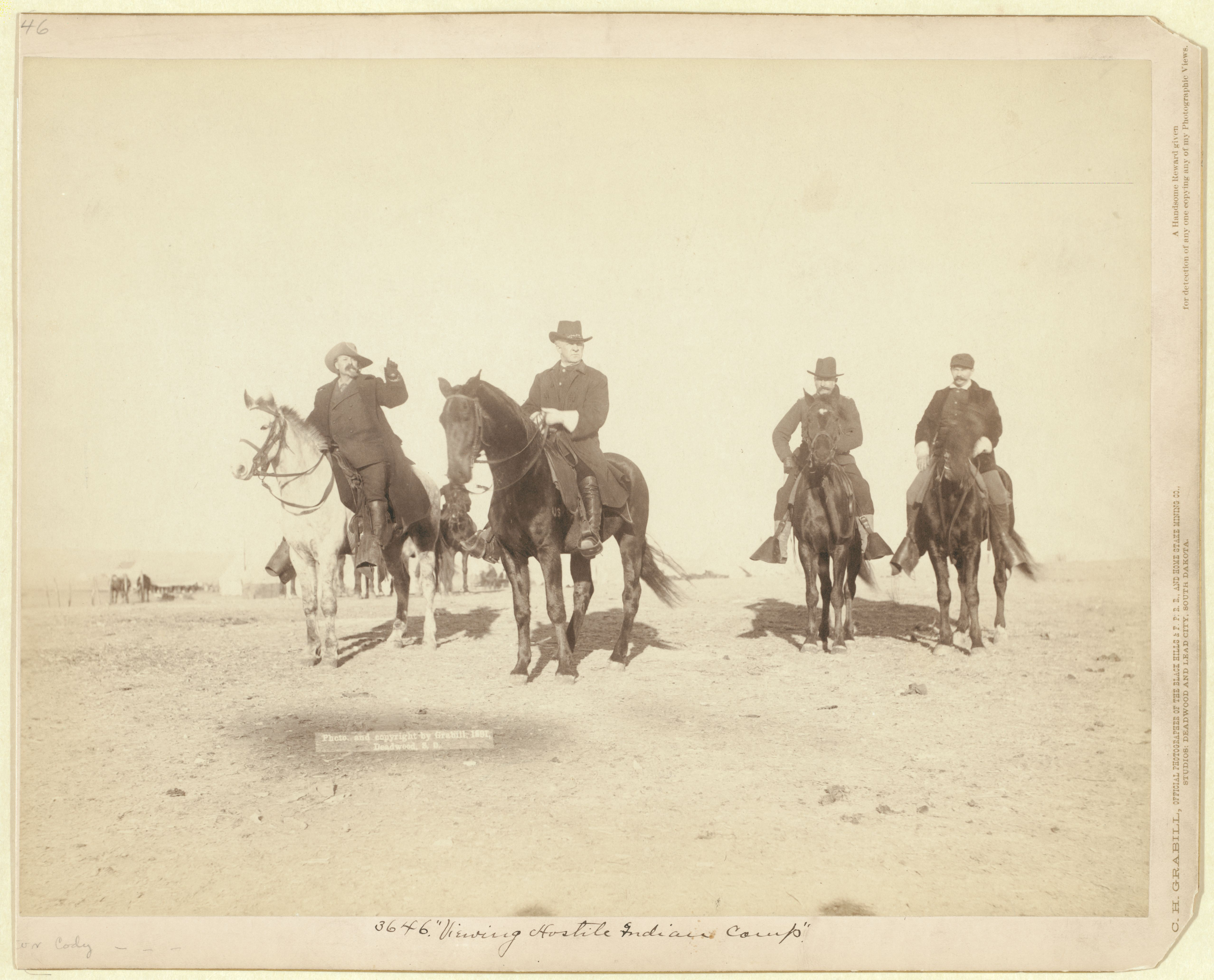
Maus (right) with Buffalo Bill, General Nelson Miles, and Captain Frank Baldwin in 1891

Maus served as aide to Gen. Nelson Appleton Miles during the latter's inspection tour to Europe in 1897 and during the Spanish–American War in 1898. Maus was promoted to major in June 1899 and a month later was made inspector general of the Department of California and Columbia. He was promoted to lieutenant colonel in June 1902 and during 1902–03 accompanied Miles on a world tour. In January 1904 he became commander and colonel of the 20th U.S. Infantry, which he commanded in the Philippine Insurrection until 1906, when he returned to California. He was temporarily in command of the Division of the Pacific during the absence of Gen. Frederick Funston and played an important role in maintaining order in San Francisco following the San Francisco earthquake. Maus was promoted to brigadier general in 1906, commanding the Department of Columbia until 1911, when he was given command of a brigade of the 2nd Division in San Antonio, Texas. At his retirement in August 1913, he was commander of a brigade of the 1st Division at Albany, New York.

Gen. Maus was a member of the Order of the Indian Wars of the United States and the Military Order of Foreign Wars.

== Personal life ==
Maus is buried in Section 3, site 3886-B, of Arlington National Cemetery. He married Ms. Mattie Lindsay Poor (November 7, 1873 – January 18, 1936), who is buried with him.

== Awards ==
- Medal of Honor
- Silver Star
- Indian Campaign Medal
- Spanish Campaign Medal
- Philippine Campaign Medal
