= Apache Scouts =

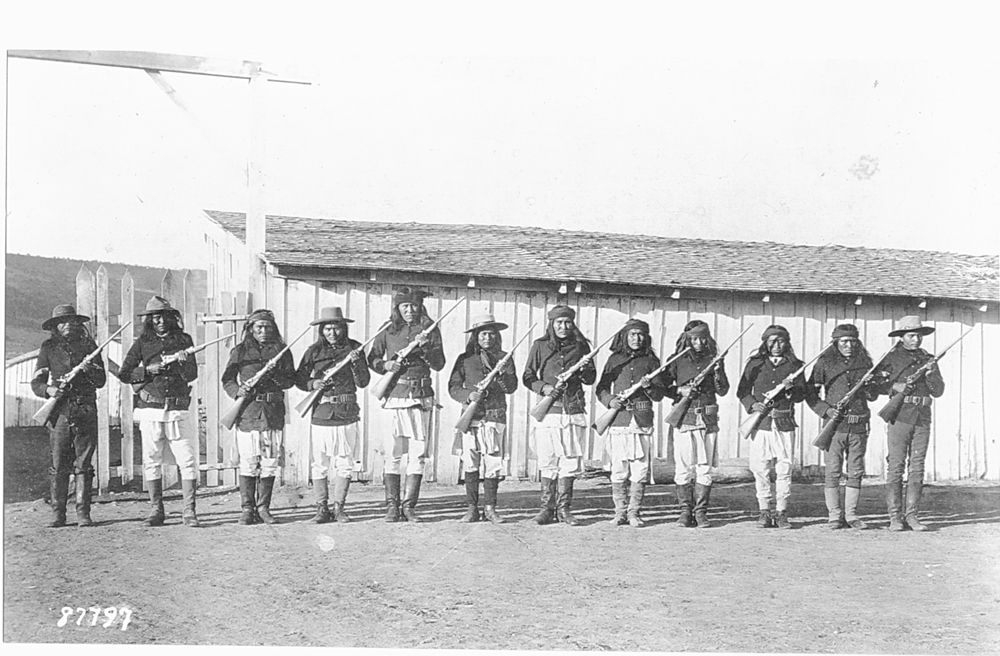
- Apache scouts at Fort Apache, Arizona, in the 1880s
- Active: 1849 - 1947
- Country: United States of America
- Allegiance: United States of America
- Branch: United States Army
- Type: Indian scouts
- Role: Cavalry tactics Charge; Close combat Desert warfare Force protection Guerrilla warfare Hand-to-hand combat Maneuver warfare Patrolling; Raiding; Reconnaissance; Tracking
- Engagements: Chiricahua War Navajo War; Yavapai War; Victorio's War; Geronimo's War Border War

The Apache Scouts were part of the United States Army Indian Scouts. Most of their service was during the Apache Wars, between 1849 and 1886, though the last scout retired in 1947. The Apache scouts were the eyes and ears of the United States military and sometimes the cultural translators for the various Apache bands and the Americans. Apache scouts also served in the Navajo War, the Yavapai War, the Mexican Border War and they saw stateside duty during World War II. There has been a great deal written about Apache scouts, both as part of United States Army reports from the field and more colorful accounts written after the events by non-Apaches in newspapers and books. Men such as Al Sieber and Tom Horn were sometimes the commanding officers of small groups of Apache Scouts. As was the custom in the United States military, scouts were generally enlisted with Anglo nicknames or single names. Many Apache Scouts received citations for bravery.

== Apache Scouts by band ==
The Apache people have been lumped together under the name "Apache" by outsiders. In reality, they are a group of culturally related Native American tribes in the Southwestern United States, which include the Chiricahua, Jicarilla, Lipan, Mescalero, Salinero, Plains and Western Apache. Distant cousins of the Apache are the Navajo, with which they share the Southern Athabaskan languages. Historically, they have defined themselves by geographical areas, clan and kinship ties with neighboring groups. Following this pattern, Apache Scouts were usually grouped in operational units by band.

Tonto Apache scouts were recruited to assist General Crook find Chief Delshay's band who fled the Fort Verde reservation. Crook's Chief of Scouts, Albert Sieber always seemed to have his Tonto scouts with him through the Apache Wars.

White Mountain Apache scouts served with Company B under Lieutenant Charles B. Gatewood from Fort Apache in 1885 to 1886. General George Crook had high praise for this group which is composed of several bands. "Chiricahuas were the most subordinate, energetic, untiring and, by odds, the most efficient of their command." These scouts were sent to Florida by General Miles, along with those who they tracked for sixteen months in 1885 and 1886, as if these Apache scouts were hostiles to be punished. They were kept captive under nominal arrest as prisoners of war, along with the rest of Geronimo's band whom they'd helped the army track down, for twenty-six years before finally being released.

Warm Springs Apache scouts served in Company B under Lieutenant Britton Davis and were in the field tracking Geronimo and Nana. In 1885 Mescalero scouts were with Major Vanm Horn cavalry which was trying to prevent Geronimo, Nana and others from crossing the Rio Grande near Fort Stanton.

== Service history ==
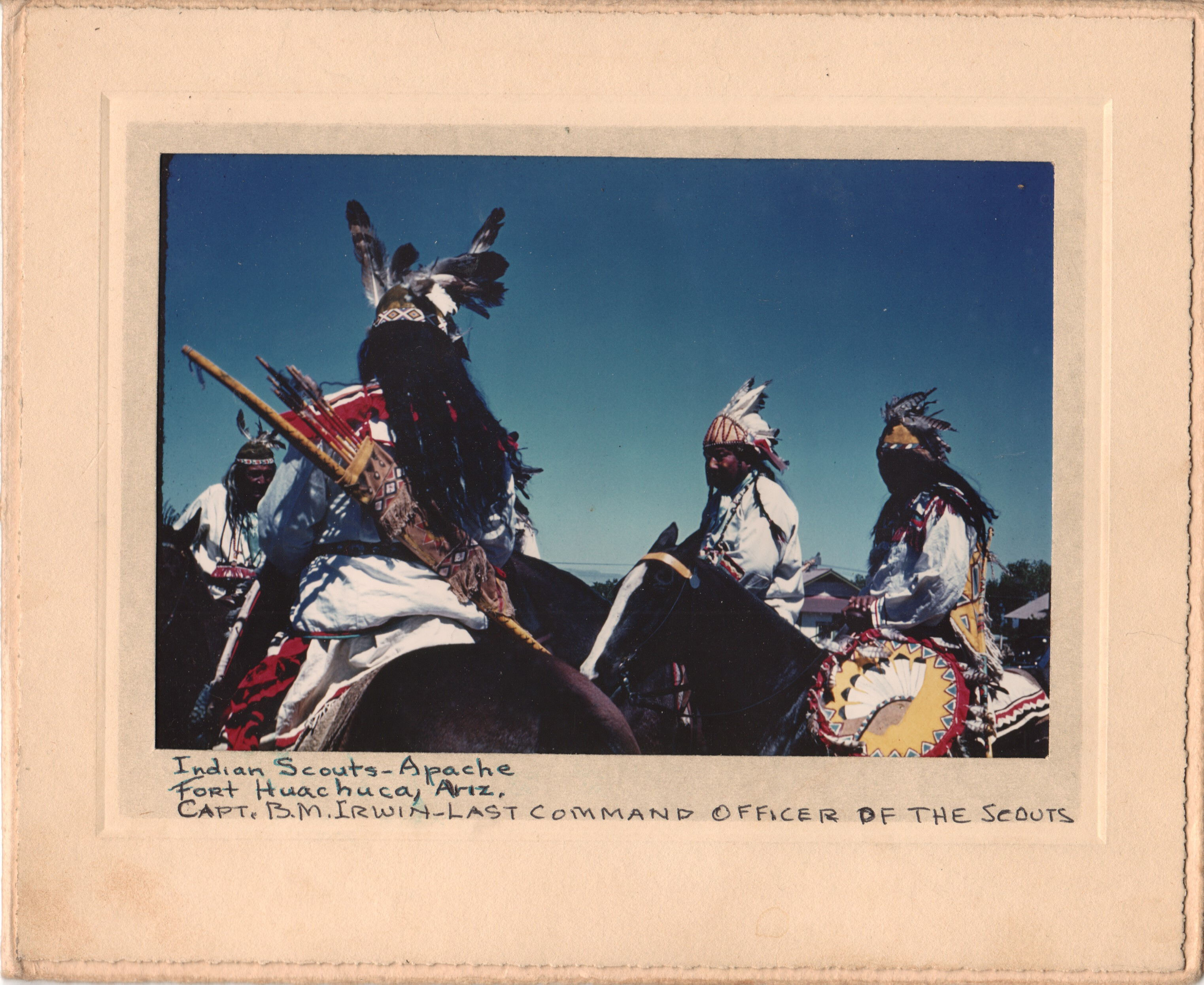
ApacheIndianScouts, Ft. Huachuca, AZ, Capt. B.M. Irwin, Last Command Officer

=== Navajo War ===
Mescalero Apache scouts served with the army during the Navajo War in 1863 and 1864. One of the last battles of the war involving the scouts occurred along the Pecos River of New Mexico Territory on January 4, 1864. After a band of about 100 Navajo warriors raided the reservation at Bosque Redondo, the local Indian agent led sixty Mescaleros south in the pursuit of the raiders and eventually caught up with them at the Pecos. When the fighting started, the Navajo realized they couldn't escape with their herd of stolen livestock so they took up defensive positions to try to fight off their pursuers. Initially, the Navajo were successful in keeping their enemies back, but, eventually, United States Army reinforcements began to arrive. After a long battle the Navajo were forced to retreat without the livestock, leaving an estimated forty dead on the field. Another twenty-five Navajos were estimated to have been wounded and a group the same size escaped. There were no casualties among the Americans or the Apache scouts and they recovered fifty horses and mules. Less than two weeks later Colonel Kit Carson would lead an expedition into Canyon de Chelly, the heart of Navajo territory, capturing most of the inhabitants and ending the war.

=== Yavapai War ===
Apache scouts were employed by the United States Army throughout most of the Apache Wars but it wasn't until about 1870 when General George Crook introduced the idea of enlisting entire companies of scouts. However, at that time, few Apaches were willing to join Crook so he was forced to recruit native Americans from various tribes across the Southwest. The majority of Crook's scouts were Apache, divided into two companies, but at first there were also Navajos, Pimas, Yaquis, Opatas, Papagos, Walapais, Yavapais, and Paiutes, as well as some Mexicans and Americans. General Crook allowed any captured Apache male to join his scouts, believing that "the wilder the Apache was, the more he was likely to know the wiles and statagems of those still out in the mountains. (sic)" While Crook was recruiting natives to fight for him, he was also fighting against the Western Apaches and the closely associated Yavapai tribe in central Arizona Territory. During the Tonto Basin Campaign in 1872, Crook deployed his scouts at the Battle of Salt River Canyon on December 28. Over 100 Yavapai and Tonto men, women and children were held up inside a cave overlooking the Salt River. With some 130 cavalrymen, and about thirty scouts, Crook attacked the cave, killing seventy-six people, including non combatants, and capturing the remaining thirty-four. The general followed up the victory with another at Turret Peak, on March 27, 1873, in which another fifty-seven Yavapai and Tonto Apache were killed. Only one man was killed on the Americans' side during both engagements and soon after the Yavapai and the Tonto began flocking to Camp Verde to surrender.

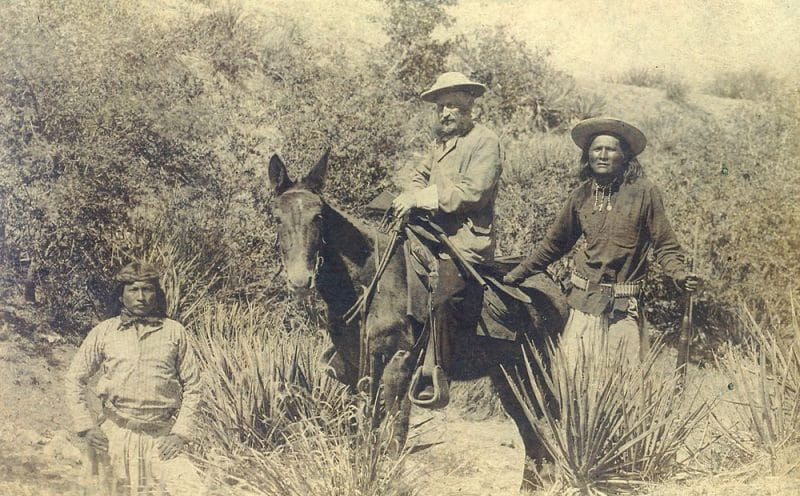
General Crook with White Mountain Apache Scout William Alchesay on the right, and an unknown Apache scout on the left.

Small bands of Yavapai and Apache raiders continued to harass the army and the settlers in and around Tonto Basin for two more years. After the war ended, General Crook departed Arizona for Dakota Territory in 1876. Colonel Augustus P. Kautz took over the command of the scouts and he formed a third company in early 1877 and a fourth in 1878. Upon taking command of the scouts, Kautz wrote; "These scouts supported by a small force of cavalry, are exceedingly efficient, and have succeeded, with one or two exceptions, in finding every party of Indians they have gone in pursuit of. They are a great terror to the runaways [renegades] from the Reservations, and for such work are more efficient than double the number of soldiers. (sic)"

=== Border War ===
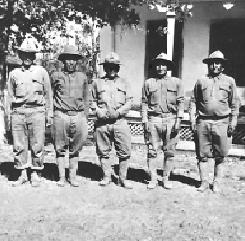
Apache scouts at Fort Apache in 1919. (Left to right) First Sergeant Chicken, Jesse Palmer, Tea Square, Sergeant Big Chow, and Corporal C.F. Josh.

Following Geronimo's surrender in 1886, there was little need for Apache scouts so their ranks were thinned down to just fifty men by 1891. In 1915 there were only twenty-four left. However, after Pancho Villa's attack on Columbus, New Mexico, in March 1916, General John J. Pershing was ordered to command a punitive expedition into Mexico to capture or kill Villa. Pershing authorized the enlistment of seventeen new Apache scouts, resulting in thirty-nine men. Pancho Villa and his rebels were operating in Chihuahua when Pershing led his army across the international border. The scouts were divided into two groups. The first group headed into Mexico from Fort Huachuca, Arizona, to join up with the 10th Cavalry Buffalo Soldiers, while the second group departed from Fort Apache, to join the 11th Cavalry. However, by the time the scouts arrived in Chihuahua, Mexico, the hunt for Villa was already suspended by Pershing, due to the defeat in the Battle of Carrizal, in which the Americans engaged Mexican government troops, known as Carrancistas. The hunt was never continued and after that Pershing began an occupation of northern Chihuahua, followed by a slow withdrawal back to the United States, under President Wilson's orders.

The first battle involving the scouts was fought at Ojo Azules Ranch. On May 5, a small group of scouts joined up with a troop from the 11th Cavalry to attack about 150 Villistas. In all sixty-one Mexicans were killed and another seventy were captured, all without sustaining any casualties.

After the expedition ended in February 1917 the army disbanded about half of the force, leaving twenty-two scouts for duty. Their war-time service was not completely over though. Conflict between the United States and Mexican armies continued until 1919 and Mexican raids across the border were a frequent occurrence into the 1920s.

== See also ==
- Traditional Apache scout
- Navajo Scouts
- Pawnee Scouts
- Crow Scouts
- Black Seminole Scouts
- Chatto (Apache)
- Crawford Affair
- Arikara scouts
