= 6th Cavalry =

6th Cavalry, 6th Cavalry Division, 6th Cavalry Brigade or 6th Cavalry Regiment may refer to:

== Corps ==
- VI Cavalry Corps (German Empire)
- VI Cavalry Corps (Grande Armée)
- 6th Cavalry Corps (Soviet Union)

== Divisions ==
- 6th Cavalry Division (German Empire)
- 6th Cavalry Division (Russian Empire)
- 6th Cavalry Division (Soviet Union)

== Brigades ==
- 6th Cavalry Brigade (Australia)
- 6th Indian Cavalry Brigade
- 6th Cavalry Brigade (Poland)
- 6th Cavalry Brigade (United Kingdom)
- 6th Cavalry Brigade (United States)

== Regiments and battalions ==
- 6th King Edward's Own Cavalry, a former regiment of the Indian Army
- 6th Bengal Irregular Cavalry
- 6th Lancers (Watson's Horse)
- 6th Madras Light Cavalry
- Regiment "Lancieri di Aosta" (6th)
- 6th Cavalry Regiment (United States)
- 6th Regiment Alabama Cavalry, a Confederate regiment of the American Civil War
- 6th Arkansas Cavalry Regiment, a Confederate regiment of the American Civil War
- 6th Arkansas Cavalry Battalion, a Confederate regiment of the American Civil War
- 6th Regiment Illinois Volunteer Cavalry, a Union regiment of the American Civil War
- 6th Regiment Indiana Cavalry, a Union regiment of the American Civil War
- 6th Regiment Iowa Volunteer Cavalry, a Union regiment of the American Civil War
- 6th Regiment Kansas Volunteer Cavalry, a Union regiment of the American Civil War
- 6th Regiment Kentucky Volunteer Cavalry, a Union regiment of the American Civil War
- 6th Michigan Volunteer Cavalry Regiment, a Union regiment of the American Civil War
- 6th Mississippi Cavalry Regiment, a Confederate regiment of the American Civil War
- 6th Missouri Volunteer Cavalry, a Union regiment of the American Civil War
- 6th New York Cavalry Regiment, a Union regiment of the American Civil War
- 6th Ohio Cavalry, a Union regiment of the American Civil War
- 6th Pennsylvania Cavalry, a Union regiment of the American Civil War
- 6th Regiment South Carolina Cavalry, a Confederate regiment of the American Civil War
- 6th Regiment Tennessee Volunteer Cavalry, a Union regiment of the American Civil War
- 6th United States Colored Cavalry Regiment, a Union regiment of the American Civil War
- 6th Virginia Cavalry, a Confederate regiment of the American Civil War

== Other uses ==
- 6th Cavalry Museum

== See also ==
- 6th (disambiguation)
