= 23rd Cavalry Division (United States) =

- Active: 1921–6 October 1940
- Country: United States of America
- Branch: United States Army National Guard
- Type: Cavalry
- Size: Division
- Garrison/HQ: New Orleans (from 1939)
- Nickname: Dixie Cavalry

The 23rd Cavalry Division was a cavalry formation of the United States Army National Guard during the interwar period.

It was created in the early 1920s due to the perceived need for additional cavalry units along with three other National Guard cavalry divisions, but its headquarters was not activated until 1939 as a result of funding shortages.

== History ==
The 23rd Cavalry Division was constituted in 1921, originally allotted to the states of Texas, Louisiana, Alabama, Georgia, Tennessee, North Carolina, New Mexico, and Massachusetts, and assigned to the Third Army. By 1927, it had been reallotted to the Fourth and Eighth Corps Areas only. Although formal activation of the division did not occur until 1939, many of the units that made up the division began organizing or were already in existence when it was constituted. The first of the units to be assigned to the division was the 56th Cavalry Brigade, which was originally raised by the Texas National Guard for service along the Mexican border in World War I. In 1921, the brigade commander, Brigadier General Jacob F. Wolters, was designated by the War Department to be the division commander of the 23rd Cavalry Division upon mobilization, a designation he retained until his retirement in 1934. The 56th Brigade consisted of the 111th and 112th Cavalry Regiments and the 56th Machine Gun Squadron. Through the 1920s, divisional units continued to be activated, beginning with the Headquarters Troop, 23rd Cavalry Division, which was organized and federally recognized at Birmingham, Alabama, on 12 April 1921. Additionally, the 55th Machine Gun Squadron, the 109th Cavalry, the 110th Cavalry, and the Headquarters Troop, 55th Cavalry Brigade, were organized. These last units constituted the bulk of the 55th Cavalry Brigade, although the brigade headquarters itself was not organized until 1936 due to budget constraints.

In the early years, training of division units centered primarily on armory drills and, of course, the annual summer camp. Armory drill periods gave the units the opportunity to train at the squad-, platoon-, and rarely, troop-level. Troop-, squadron-, and regimental-level training was generally reserved for summer camp. By 1932, however, both the 55th and 56th Cavalry Brigades were conducting brigade-level exercises each summer. The bulk of the division's units, being located in the Fourth Corps Area, trained each summer at Fort Oglethorpe, Georgia, with the 6th Cavalry Regiment, while the 56th Cavalry Brigade and the 141st Field Artillery trained at Camp Wolters, Texas, and Camp Beauregard, Louisiana, respectively. Since the 23rd Cavalry Division's brigades were able to concentrate their subordinate units for summer camp, they were consistently rated among the best, if not the best, National Guard cavalry units by Regular Army evaluators.

Commanders and staff officers of the major units in the division had several opportunities to work together before the division's activation. The first of these was in September 1936, when officers of the division participated in the Third Army command post exercise (CPX) at Camp Bullis, Texas. The provisional 23rd Division staff was made up of officers primarily from the 55th and 56th Cavalry Brigades. During the CPX, the Regular Army officers working with the 23rd Division gave the provisional staff high praise for their performance. The next opportunity came in August 1938 when the entire 23rd Cavalry Division participated in the Third Army maneuvers. Due to cost constraints, however, the Third Army could not be assembled in one location so the 23rd did not train as a division. The bulk of the division participated in the Fourth Corps Area portion of the exercise in Mississippi’s De Soto National Forest under control of the 55th Cavalry Brigade. The 56th Cavalry Brigade participated in the Eighth Corps Area exercise at Camp Bullis, near San Antonio, Texas

The Third Army commander was so satisfied with the performance of the 23rd Division's units that he recommended that the National Guard horse divisions should be retained in the army structure and mobilized as such in time of war. In October 1938, the 53rd Cavalry Brigade was relieved from assignment to the 22nd Cavalry Division and assigned to the 23rd Cavalry Division, while the 56th Cavalry Brigade was reassigned to the Third Army as a separate brigade. On 18 October 1939, at long last the division headquarters was organized and federally recognized at New Orleans, Louisiana, and the 23rd Cavalry Division formally came into existence with Major General James F. Edmonds appointed as the first, and ultimately the only, commander. General Edmonds and his staff almost immediately began preparations for the 23rd Cavalry Division to take part in the 1940 Louisiana Maneuvers. In January 1940, General Edmonds assembled the division staff at Roberts Field in Birmingham, Alabama, for the additional training directed by the War Department for all National Guard units that winter. During that training, the division staff, the division headquarters troop, and the headquarters and headquarters troop, 55th Cavalry Brigade participated in a CPX.

Two months later, Edmonds and the division staff traveled to Fort Bliss, Texas, to train with the staff of the 1st Cavalry Division from 17 to 20 March 1940. This training was specifically designed to prepare the staff for that summer's maneuvers. During the Louisiana Maneuvers, the 23rd Cavalry Division was assigned the mission to provide reconnaissance for the IV Corps and, during the exercise, it operated against the VIII Corps and the Regulars of the 1st Cavalry Division in the Kisatchie National Forest. Subsequent reports stated that the 23rd did a credible job despite facing the more experienced Regular Army troops and the difficulties caused by the rental horses provided to the National Guard units. The efforts of the 23rd Cavalry Division during the exercise were good, but not good enough to save it from the Army's troop basis planners. Its performance notwithstanding, the 23d Cav. Div. was inactivated 6 October 1940 and disbanded effective 1 November 1940.

== Organization, 1940 ==
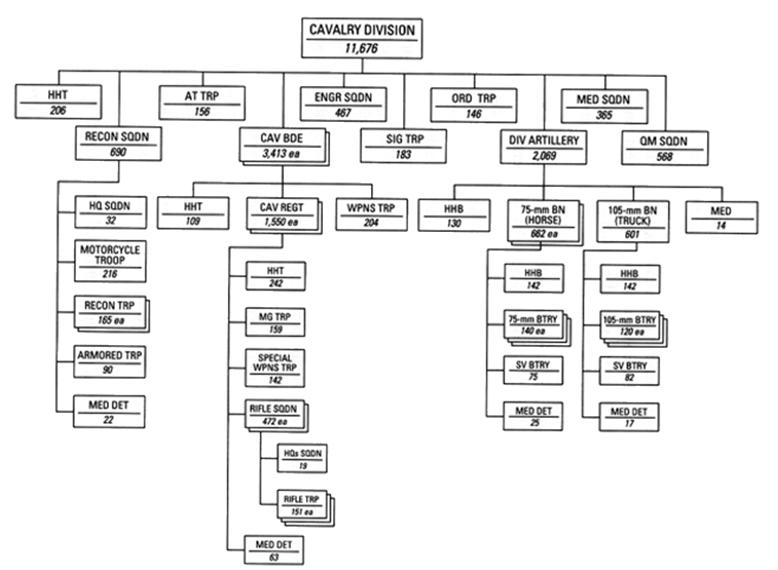
Standard organization chart for a Cavalry Division in November 1940

The 23rd Cavalry Division was organized at some time after World War I, and was not activated in World War II. Of its component regiments, only the 106th Cavalry Regiment served under a cavalry designation during World War II.

- Headquarters (New Orleans, Louisiana)
- Headquarters, Special Troops (New Orleans, Louisiana)
  - Headquarters Troop (New Orleans, Louisiana)
  - 23rd Signal Troop (Birmingham, Alabama)
  - 127th Ordnance Company (Medium) (Wisconsin National Guard) **
  - 23rd Tank Company (Light) (Illinois National Guard) **
- 53rd Cavalry Brigade
  - Headquarters (Madison, Wisconsin)
  - Headquarters Troop (Stanley, Wisconsin)
  - 105th Cavalry Regiment (Nekoosa, Wisconsin)
  - 106th Cavalry Regiment (Chicago, Illinois)
- 55th Cavalry Brigade
  - Headquarters (New Orleans, Louisiana
  - Headquarters Troop (Birmingham, Alabama)
  - 108th Cavalry Regiment (Hinesville, Georgia)
  - 109th Cavalry Regiment (Chattanooga, Tennessee)
- 23rd Reconnaissance Squadron (Springfield, Illinois)
- 141st Field Artillery Regiment (New Orleans, Louisiana)
- 127th Engineer Squadron (Huntsville, Alabama)
- 123rd Medical Squadron (Alabama National Guard) *
- 123rd Quartermaster Squadron (Illinois National Guard) *

One asterisk indicated the unit was partially organized, with the designated headquarters location for mobilization shown. Two asterisks indicated the unit was allotted, but unorganized or inactive, with the state of headquarters allocation shown.
