= John Connor (Medal of Honor) =

Soldier in the American Indian Wars

John Conner
- Born: January 1, 1845; Galway, Ireland
- Died: February 5, 1907 (aged 61–62)
- Burial place: United States Soldiers' and Airmen's Home National Cemetery, Washington, D.C.
- Military career
- Allegiance: United States
- Branch: United States Army
- Service years: 1869 - 1874, 1875 - 1890
- Rank: Sergeant
- Units: Company H, 6th Cavalry Regiment
- Conflicts: American Indian Wars
- Awards: Medal of Honor

John Connor (January 1, 1845 – February 5, 1907) was an American soldier who received the Medal of Honor for his actions during the American Indian Wars.

Connor was born January 1, 1845, and after joining the United States Army from Jefferson, Texas in July 1869 was assigned to Company H, 6th Cavalry Regiment in the American Indian Wars. He participated in combat in Texas on the Wichita River on July 12, 1870, and received the Medal of Honor for what was described as "gallantry in action" there.

He was promoted Sergeant the following December, and was discharged in July 1874. He re-enlisted in January 1875, joining the 2nd Artillery Regiment, and served until December 1890.

He died on February 5, 1907, and is buried in the United States Soldiers' and Airmen's Home National Cemetery, Washington, D.C. His grave can be found in section K-7258.

== Medal of Honor citation ==
Citation:

For gallantry in action on 12 July 1870, while serving with Company H, 6th U.S. Cavalry, in action at Wichita River, Texas.

== See also ==
- List of Medal of Honor recipients
