= Walter H. Yates Jr. =

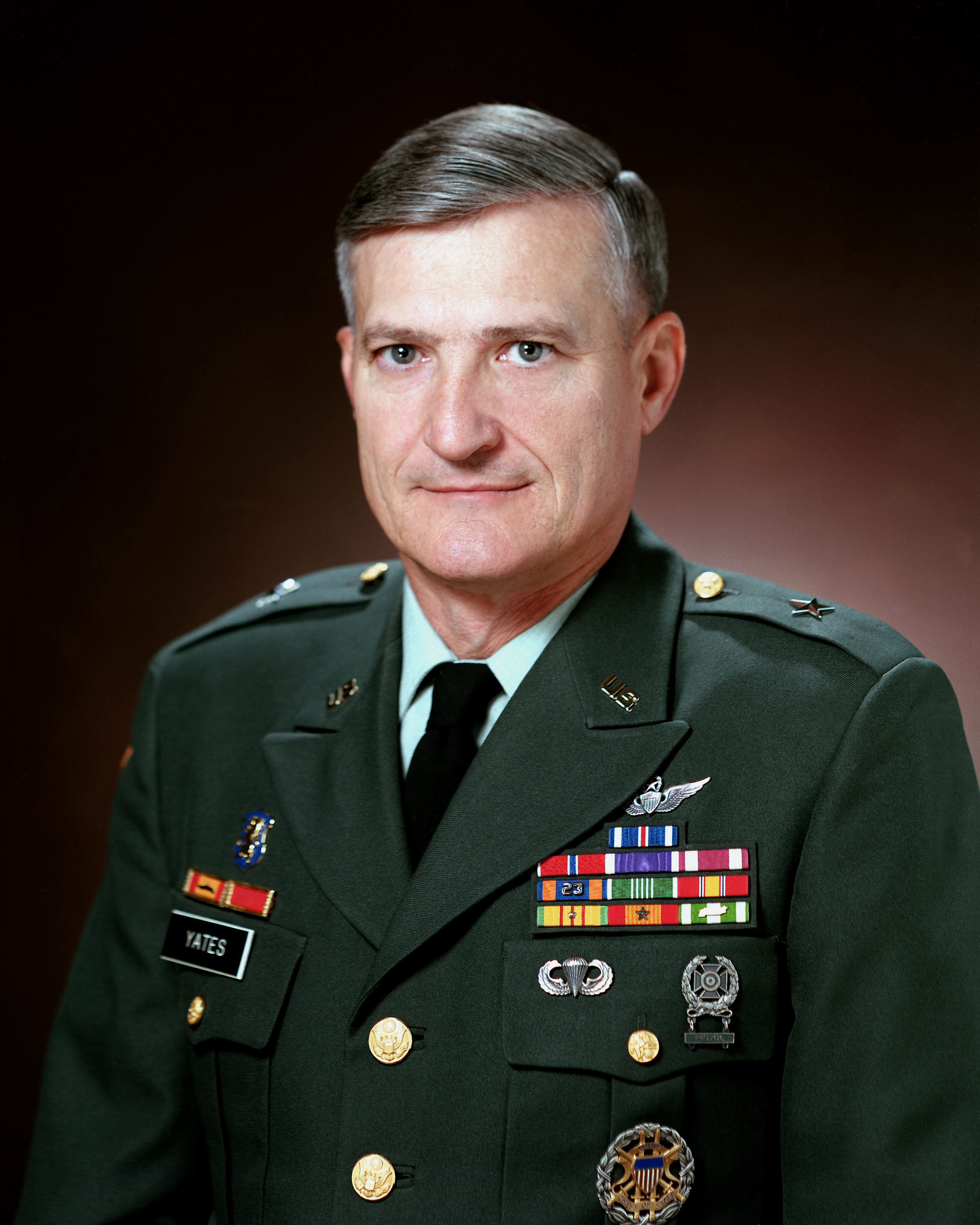
Yates as a brigadier general in September 1989

Major General Walter Harvey Yates Jr. (born November 6, 1941) is a retired United States Army officer who served as Deputy Commanding General of the Fifth United States Army. He is a native of Hattiesburg, Mississippi and 1963 graduate of The University of Southern Mississippi with a Bachelor of Science degree in Mathematics. He also holds a Master of Science degree in Foreign Affairs from George Washington University. In addition, General Yates attended the DOD Joint Warfighting course and the Harvard program for National and International Securities Studies.

During his career, Yates held a variety of important command and staff positions, including Deputy Commanding General V (US) Corps, United States Army Europe from September 26, 1994 to September 24, 1996; Assistant Division Commander (Maneuver), 3rd Armored Division; Commander of the Giessen Military Community, United States Army Europe; Commander U.S. Army Berlin and the Berlin Brigade, United States Army Europe; and Deputy Director National Military Command Center J-3 and Chief of Conventional Plans Division J-7, the Joint Staff, Washington, D.C. A graduate of the Army Aviation School, he also served as commanding officer of the 503rd Aviation Battalion (Combat), the Apache Training Brigade and the 6th Cavalry Brigade. Yates retired from active duty on January 31, 1998.

His military decorations include the Distinguished Service Medal, Defense Superior Service Medal, Legion of Merit with Oak Leaf Cluster, Distinguished Flying Cross, Bronze Star, Purple Heart, Meritorious Service Medal with Oak Leaf Cluster, twenty-three Air Medals and the Army Commendation Medal.

- Army Distinguished Service Medal
- Defense Superior Service Medal
- Legion of Merit with oak leaf cluster
- Distinguished Flying Cross
- Bronze Star
- Purple Heart
- Meritorious Service Medal with oak leaf cluster
- Air Medal with numeral "23"
- Army Commendation Medal
