= 3rd Cavalry Division (United States) =

- Shoulder Sleeve Insignia
- Active: 1927–1940
- Country: United States of America
- Branch: United States Army
- Type: Cavalry
- Size: Division
- Garrison/HQ: Fort Des Moines, Iowa

The United States Army's 3rd Cavalry Division was created from the perceived need for additional cavalry units during the interwar period.

The 3rd Cavalry Division was largely a "paper" formation existing from 1927 to 1940. Its cavalry regiments were active units, but most of the support elements were "Regular Army Inactive" (RAI) units manned with Organized Reserve personnel. The division never assembled in a single location or conducted large-scale training, and was disbanded on 10 October 1940.

== History ==
The 3rd Cavalry Division was constituted in the Regular Army on 15 August 1927, allotted to the Fourth, Sixth, Seventh, and Eighth Corps Areas, and assigned to the Second Army. The division was reassigned to the General Headquarters Reserve (GHQR) as a result of the US Army reorganization of 1933. The 3rd Cavalry Division's designated mobilization station was Fort Des Moines, Iowa, where many of the division’s units were organized with Reserve officers as RAI units and where most of them conducted their annual summer training camps. The 3rd Cavalry Division consisted largely of RAI units; the only active elements of the division in the 1920s and 1930s consisted of the cavalry regiments. Unlike the 2nd Cavalry Division, the 3rd Cavalry Division’s active units were not concentrated in one or two areas, but were spread from coast to coast, but like the 2nd Cavalry Division, however, RAI units of the 3rd Cavalry Division were predominantly located in the Seventh Corps Area with most being initially concentrated in the Kansas City metropolitan area. These units conducted their summer training at Fort Riley, Kansas and were under the peacetime control of the Headquarters, 66th Cavalry Division, for administrative and training purposes. In 1933, several of the division’s RAI units were transferred to the Third Corps Area, but by the late 1930s, most of the division’s RAI units were relocated to Des Moines.

== Organization ==
- Headquarters & Headquarters Troop
- Headquarters and Headquarters Troop, 5th Cavalry Brigade (RAI)
  - 9th Cavalry Regiment (Colored) (assigned 18 August 1933; reassigned to 2nd Cavalry Division 10 October 1940)
  - 10th Cavalry Regiment (Colored) (assigned 15 August 1927-10 October 1940)
  - 11th Cavalry Regiment (Colored) (reassigned to 2nd Cavalry Division 1 May 1932)
  - 5th Machine Gun Squadron (RAI) (demobilized 1 February 1928)
- Headquarters and Headquarters Troop, 6th Cavalry Brigade (RAI)
  - 3rd Cavalry Regiment (assigned 15 August 1927–10 October 1940)
  - 6th Cavalry Regiment (assigned 15 August 1927–1 December 1939)
  - 6th Machine Gun Squadron (RAI) (demobilized 1 February 1928)
- Headquarters, Special Troops (RAI)
  - Headquarters Troop (RAI)
  - 3rd Signal Troop (RAI)
  - 16th Ordnance Company (RAI)
  - 13th Tank Company (RAI)
- 84th Field Artillery Battalion (Horse) (redesignated 2nd Battalion., 82nd Field Artillery, and relieved from division 17 March 1930)
- 84th Field Artillery Regiment (assigned 17 March 1930)
- 12th Engineer Battalion (RAI)
- 3rd Medical Squadron (RAI)
- 3rd Cavalry Division Train, Quartermaster Corps (RAI) (reorganized as 18th Quartermaster Squadron 1 April 1936)
- 44th Observation Squadron (assigned 28 February 1927-15 February 1929)

== See also ==
- Formations of the United States Army
- List of armored regiments of the United States Army
