= 6th Cavalry Regiment =

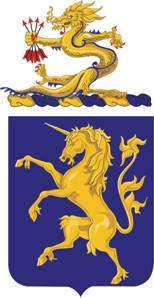
- Coat of arms
- Active: 1861–present
- Country: United States
- Branch: United States Army Aviation Branch
- Type: Cavalry (American Civil War–Vietnam War) air cavalry (Vietnam War–present)
- Part of: Attack, Close air support, Aerial Reconnaissance, Combat search and rescue
- Garrison/HQ: Multiple battalions on different bases
- Nickname: Fighting Sixth
- Mottos: Ducit Amor Patriae (Led By Love of Country)
- Colors: Blue; Yellow
- Engagements: American Civil War; Indian Wars; Johnson County War; Spanish–American War; Boxer Rebellion; Philippine–American War; Mexican Expedition; World War II; Persian Gulf War; Operation Desert Storm; Operation Desert Shield; Iraq War; War in Afghanistan (2001–2021)

Commanders
- Notable commanders: Charles E. Canedy; Samuel H. Starr

Insignia
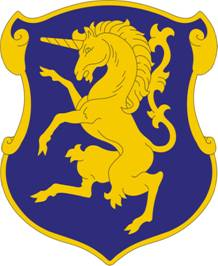
- Regimental distinctive insignia

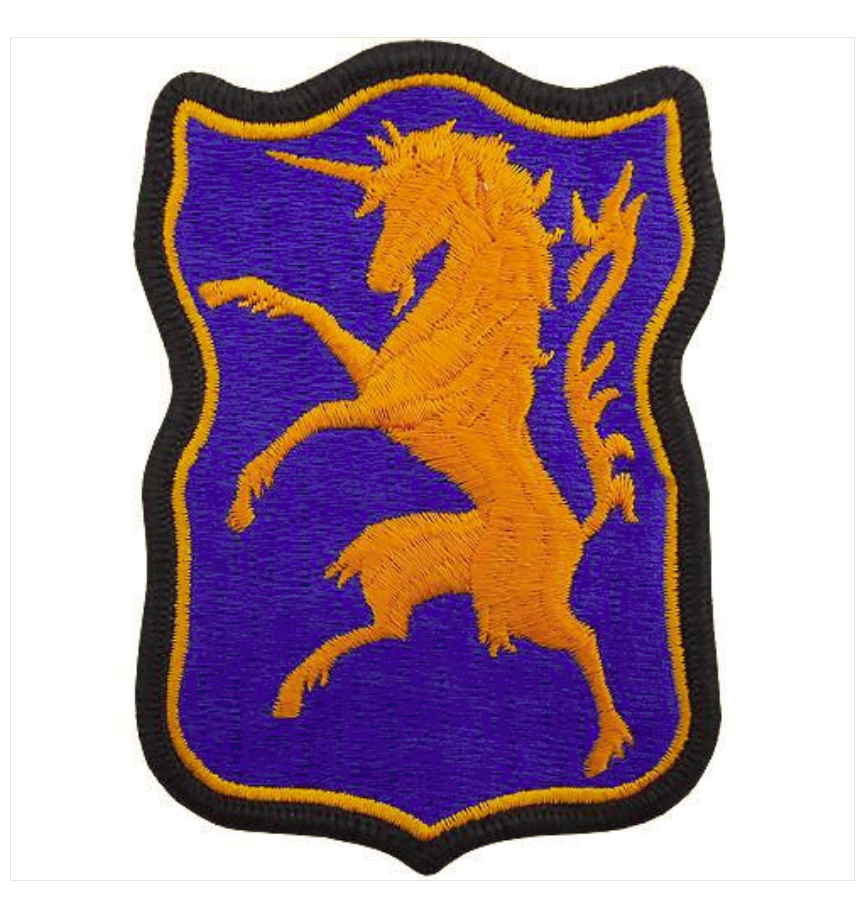
- Former shoulder sleeve insignia

The 6th Cavalry ("Fighting Sixth'") is a regiment of the United States Army that began as a regiment of cavalry in the American Civil War. It currently is organized into aviation squadrons that are assigned to several different combat aviation brigades.

== History ==
=== American Civil War (1861-1865) ===
The 3rd U.S. Cavalry Regiment was organized on 3 May 1861 in Pittsburgh, Pennsylvania. It was commanded by Colonel David Hunter (1802-1886), and second in command was Lieutenant Colonel William H. Emory (1811-1887). The regiment's designation was changed to the 6th U.S. Cavalry Regiment on 10 August 1861 due to a general reorganization of all United States Army cavalry regiments a few months shortly after the beginning of the Civil War; the Regiment of Mounted Rifles took on the name of the 3rd Cavalry Regiment instead. The troopers were recruited from Pennsylvania, Ohio, and Western New York. Arriving in Washington D.C. by company between 12 October and 23 December, the regiment joined the Union Army of the Potomac, camping south of the federal national capital city and began its training with a strength of 34 officers and 950 men.

Due to supply shortages, all but one squadron was equipped as light cavalry, armed with pistols and sabers. It wasn't until 10 March that the rest of the regiment received carbines. The 6th Cavalry left winter quarters on 10 March 1862 and was assigned to General Philip St. George Cooke's command, who ordered them to make reconnaissance in Virginia of Centreville, Manassas Junction, and Bull Run. On 27 March, the regiment embarked for Fort Monroe and arrived three days later.

Upon arrival, the 6th Cavalry served as forward scouts for the Army of the Potomac's advance units throughout the Peninsular Campaign, moving northwestward up the peninsula towards the Confederate capital city of Richmond, Virginia on the upper James River. The regiment experienced combat for the first time on 5 May 1862 after the Siege of Yorktown (second siege since the American Revolutionary War in 1780-1781 against the army of Lord Cornwallis). After pursuing General Joseph E. Johnston's force of retreating Confederate States Army troops through the city, the armies met at the Battle of Williamsburg on 5 May. In the battle, Captain Sanders executed a counter charge into Confederate artillery and a superior force of horsemen and managed to drive them off. The 6th Cavalry continued to serve as scouts for the Army of the Potomac until the evacuation at Harrison's Landing, where they served as rear guards for the evacuating forces. Arriving in Alexandria on 2 September 1862, the 6th was in near constant contact with the Confederates for three months and engaging in skirmishes such as those at Falls Church, Sugarloaf Mountain (Maryland), Middletown, and Charleston. The regiment marched to the Rappahannock River on 24 November and remained in the vicinity until the men marched on Fredericksburg on 12 December.

During the Battle of Fredericksburg, the 6th Cavalry sent a squadron across the pontoon bridge over the Rappahannock River in order to reconnoiter the enemy positions. The Confederate's infantry line was developed, and the squadron withdrew after receiving fire from an enemy artillery battery, losing 2 men and 8 horses wounded. After reporting this information to General Ambrose Burnside, the Union commander, the regiment was withdrawn to Falmouth, where it remained encamped until 13 April 1863. The 6th was one of the Union cavalry regiments that participated in Stoneman's 1863 raid, and during the action, LT Tupper and 10 troopers managed to capture General J. E. B. Stuart's chief quartermaster.

On 9 June 1863, the 6th Cavalry fought in the Battle of Brandy Station after crossing the Rappahannock River. During this famous engagement, the regiment charged the Confederates and lost 4 officers and 63 men killed, wounded, or captured out of 254 engaged. Charging the Confederate guns, LT Madden was hit by an exploding shell, and LT Kerin was captured when the regiment began reforming from the charge. The troopers were moved to the extreme right of the line in order to repulse a Confederate flank attack and charged into the action. Here, LT Ward was killed, and LT Stroll was wounded. LT Stroll was fired upon as he fell and the soldiers who attempted to bear him away were shot down by rebel gunfire. The 6th was to be rear guard of the retiring Union force, and, led by LT Tupper, it checked the enemy at every stop and prevented the harassment of the column. This was one of the most serious cavalry actions of the war, and the 6th lost a quarter of its troopers.

==== Battle of Fairfield ====
During the Gettysburg campaign of the second major Confederate invasion of the North in the Eastern Theatre of June–July 1863, and overseen by larger events ongoing nearby, on 3 July 1863 at the Battle of Fairfield, Major Starr with 400 troopers dismounted his men in a field and an orchard on both sides of the road near Fairfield, Pennsylvania. Union troopers directed by their officers took up hasty defensive positions on this slight ridge. They threw back a mounted charge of the 7th Virginia Cavalry (CSA), just as Chew's Battery (CSA) unlimbered and opened fire on the Federal cavalrymen. Supported by the 6th Virginia Cavalry (CSA), the 7th Virginia charged again, clearing Starr's force off the ridge and inflicting heavy losses. Jones (CSA), outnumbering the Union forces by at least 2 to 1, pursued the retreating Federals for three miles to the Fairfield Gap, but was unable to catch his quarry.

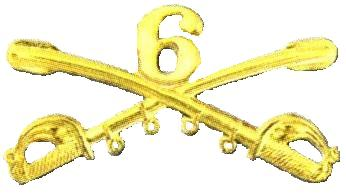
6th Regiment United States Cavalry insignia

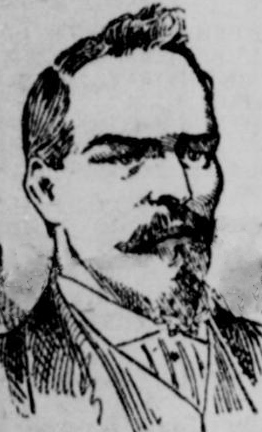
George Crawford Platt

"The fight made at Fairfield by this small regiment (6th U.S. Cavalry) against two of the crack brigades of Stuart's cavalry, which were endeavoring to get around the flank the Union army to attack the (supply) trains, was one of the most gallant in its history and no doubt helped influence the outcome the battle of Gettysburg. The efforts of these rebel brigades were frustrated and their entire strength neutralized for the day by the fierce onslaught of the small squadrons. The regiment was cut to pieces, but it fought so well that the squadrons were regarded as the advance of a large body of troops. The senior officer of those attacking CSA brigades was later adversely criticized for allowing his command to be delayed by such an inferior force. Had the regiment not made the desperate stand, the two brigades of Virginians might have caused grave injury in the Federal rear, before sufficient force could have been gathered in their front."

Private George Crawford Platt, later Sergeant, an Irish immigrant serving in Troop H, was awarded the Medal of Honor on 12 July 1895, for his actions that day at Fairfield. His citation reads, "Seized the regimental flag upon the death of the standard bearer in a hand-to-hand fight and prevented it from falling into the hands of the enemy."

His "commander," Lieutenant Carpenter, of Troop H, was one of only three officers of the 6th U.S. Cavalry to escape from the deadly melee at Fairfield. He was an eyewitness and documented Private Platt's "beyond the call of duty" behavior that day. Louis H. Carpenter was brevetted from lieutenant to lieutenant colonel for his actions that day and later during the Indian Wars he was awarded the Medal of Honor.

==== Post-Gettysburg ====
Shortly after the Battle of Fairfield, the regiment made a reconnaissance of Funkstown, Maryland on 10 July 1863, and was heavily engaged in the Battle of Funkstown losing 1 officer and 85 men killed, wounded, and missing. Arriving at Germantown, Maryland on 8 August, the 6th Cavalry replaced its tremendous casualties and trained and occasionally fought in minor battles with rebel scouts. Leaving winter quarters on 4 May 1864, the Cavalry, under Major General Philip Sheridan were heavily engaged four days later in the Battle of Todd's Tavern in Todd's Tavern, Virginia. The 6th US Cavalry participated in several other raids and battles in Virginia in 1864 under the command of General Sheridan and as a part of the Union Cavalry Corps. These battles include the Battle of Yellow Tavern in Richmond, where J. E. B Stuart was killed, the Battle of Trevilian Station in Louisa County, the Battle of Berryville in Clarke County, the Battle of Opequon near Winchester, and the Battle of Cedar Creek in Frederick County, Shenandoah County and Warren County.

On 27 February, the 6th Cavalry broke camp from its winter quarters and engaged the Confederate Army on 30 March 1865 at the Battle of Dinwiddie Court House in Dinwiddie County. Here, the men of the 6th held out against repeated enemy attacks until their ammunition was exhausted, and during their withdrawal, Confederate troops captured a LT Nolan and 15 6th Cavalry troopers. On 1 April 1865, at the Battle of Five Forks near Petersburg, the 6th Cavalry wheeled to the right of the enemy's positions and advanced until sunset when the battle was won. The regiment then began a pursuit of the retreating enemy and participated in the Battle of Sailor's Creek near Farmville, resulting in the capture of roughly 7,000 Confederate prisoners. During this battle, the 6th was ordered to capture a series of log huts. Some of the men in the ranks hesitated; they were cautious and wary of death so close to the perceived end of the war, but LT McClellan, a veteran of the antebellum Army, turned and exclaimed, "Men, let us die like soldiers!" Soon the troopers charged under heavy fire and took the log huts with the loss of three wounded.

At the Battle of Appomattox Court House in Appomattox County on 9 April 1865, the 6th charged at a gallop on the enemy's left flank, but were met with a white flag of surrender. Soon after (at 4 p.m. that day), the rest of Gen. Robert E. Lee's Army of Northern Virginia would surrender, precipitating the end of the Confederacy and the American Civil War. According to the US Army Center of Military History, "The records of casualties during the Rebellion show seven officers killed, 53 men killed in action and 53 other deaths; 122 wounded in action and 17 by accident; 438 missing, most of these being captured at Fairfield and in other charges,—making a total of 689 enlisted men."

=== Reconstruction ===
After the fighting stopped in April 1865, came the Reconstruction era of the United States covering 1865 to 1871. The 6th Cavalry left Maryland, via New York and New Orleans to Texas in October 1865. On 29 November 1865, the 6th Cavalry headquarters was established in Austin where it was part of the Fifth Military District which covered Texas and Louisiana under General Sheridan and later under General Winfield Scott Hancock.

There was little or no fighting during the state of martial law imposed while the military closely supervised local government, enrolled freemen to vote, excluded former Confederate leaders from elected office for a period of time, supervised free elections, and tried to protect office holders and freedmen from violence. However the men did face a low level of civil hostility and violence during this uneasy transition period. For reports of soldiers of the 6th Cavalry killed and wounded in various incidents of 1867–68 see the article on the Fifth Military District. One such incident occurred on 7 March 1868, when CPL Henhold of D Troop led 13 troopers on an expedition to break up the band of ex-Confederate renegades under Robert J. Lee. The pursuit ended at Read Creek Swamp, near Sherman, TX, and the troopers killed 2 and captured 5 of the desperados.

On 12 July 1870, CPT Curwen B. McClellan led a detachment of 53 troopers on a patrol from Fort Richardson when they came into contact with a large force of 250 Kiowa warriors under Chief Kicking Bird at the Little Wichita River. 6th Cavalry historians note how the Indians charged and fought bravely at close range. Chief Kicking Bird personally killed CPL John Given with a lance thrust. Despite being outnumbered, CPT McClellan was able to retreat to safety after killing 15 Kiowa and wounding many more, and losing 2 men killed and 9 wounded.

=== Red River War ===
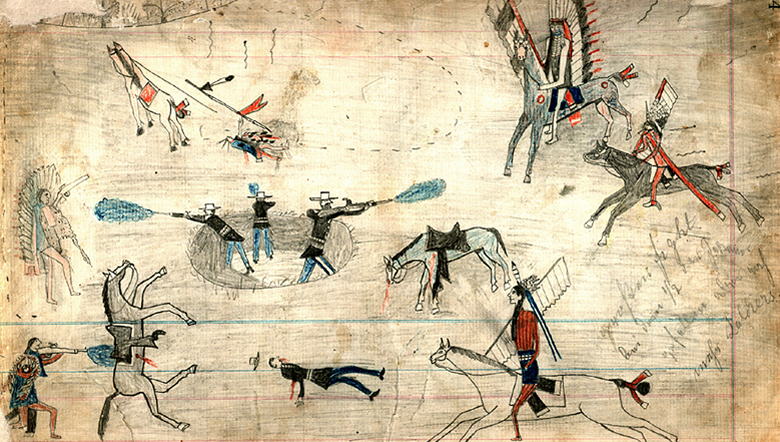
Battle of the Buffalo Wallow, 1874.

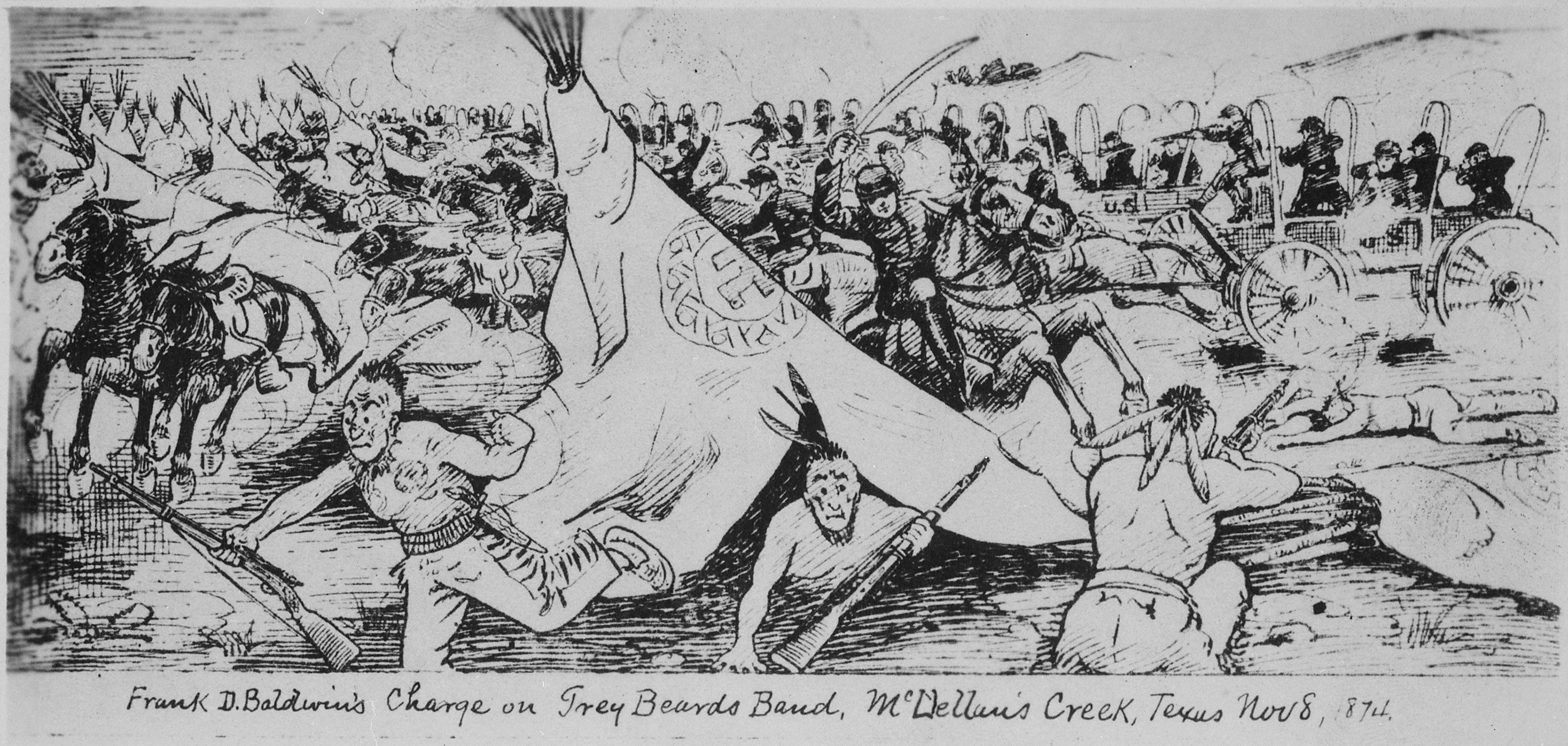
6th Cavalry charge on Grey Beard's Band, McClellan's Creek, TX, 8 Nov. 1874

In 1871, the regiment was transferred to the Department of the Missouri where it continued to engage Native American tribes and fought in the Red River War. On 9 September 1873 a drunken row among 6th cavalrymen in Hays, Kansas resulted in two troopers being killed. On 30 August 1874, COL Nelson A. Miles led an expedition of 6th Cavalry Troopers and 5th U.S. Infantry soldiers and engaged 600 Southern Cheyenne on the Prairie Dog Town Fork Red River. Despite the Indians occupying a series of bluffs, the cavalry was rapidly deployed and charged the enemy, scattering them into the nearby canyons. The regiment was commended for its actions in the battle. While carrying dispatches on the Texas plain on the morning of 12 September 1874, 4 Troopers from I Troop, 6th Cavalry and 2 civilian scouts were encircled by 125 Kiowa warriors. PVT Smith was immediately shot and mortally wounded, and the remaining scouts and troopers found meager refuge in a Buffalo wallow where they fought off their attackers until nightfall. All the men, civilians included, received the Medal of Honor for their dogged will to survive. On 8 November 1874, Troop D of the 6th Cavalry and Company D of the 5th U.S. Infantry attacked and destroyed Chief Grey Beard's Cheyenne village on McClellan's Fork of the Red River. Two captive settlers, Adelaide and Julia German, who had been captured on their family's journey to Colorado, were also rescued during the fight.

On 1 December, CPT Adna Chaffee led I Troop on a night attack to surprise the Indians on the North Fork of the Red River and managed to rout them and capture 70 of their mounts. The winter of 1874–75 was rough and cold on the Great Plains, and the Indians were not able to conduct their raids in such cold. There was relative peace until 6 April 1875, when M Troop engaged a band of 150 warriors near the Cheyenne Agency. 9 Cheyenne were killed and 4 Sixth Cavalry troopers were wounded. On 19 April 1875, a party of Cheyennes left the reservation heading north, and 40 Cavalrymen from H Troop under LT Austin Henely pursued them. After a rapid campaign of scouting and hard riding, the troopers caught up with the band at Sappa Creek, Kansas. The ensuing gunfight left 27 Indians dead for the loss of 2 US soldiers from H Troop. 134 Indian mounts were also captured.

=== Apache Wars ===
In 1875, the 6th Cavalry marched south to relieve the 5th Cavalry Regiment in Arizona, and the various Troops were sent across the territory to occupy forts and patrol the area in search of hostile Apaches. On 9 January 1876, A and D Troops, posted at Fort Apache, were the first of the 6th Cavalry to engage the Apache. One Indian was killed, five were captured, and the others were driven away. In the spring and summer of 1876, the entire 6th Cavalry Regiment went into the field to move the Chiricahua onto the San Carlos Apache Indian Reservation. There was a small engagement on 10 April, but the majority of the Indians were moved onto reservation land. However, many of the warriors fled to the mountains and continued a guerrilla war from there. The cavalry continued to occupy forts and patrol the Arizona Territory and fought recorded engagements against the Apache on 15 August, and 5 October 1876. In January 1877, LT John A. Rucker led a detachment of Troopers from Troops H and L overtook an Apache band in the Pyramid Mountains, New Mexico on 9 January 1877. They killed 10 Indians, and captured 1, along with their entire herd, weapons and ammunition supply, stolen goods from settlers, and $1,200 in Mexican silver. Capt. Whitside and two Troops of the 6th Cav founded Fort Huachuca, SE of Tucson, in March 1877.

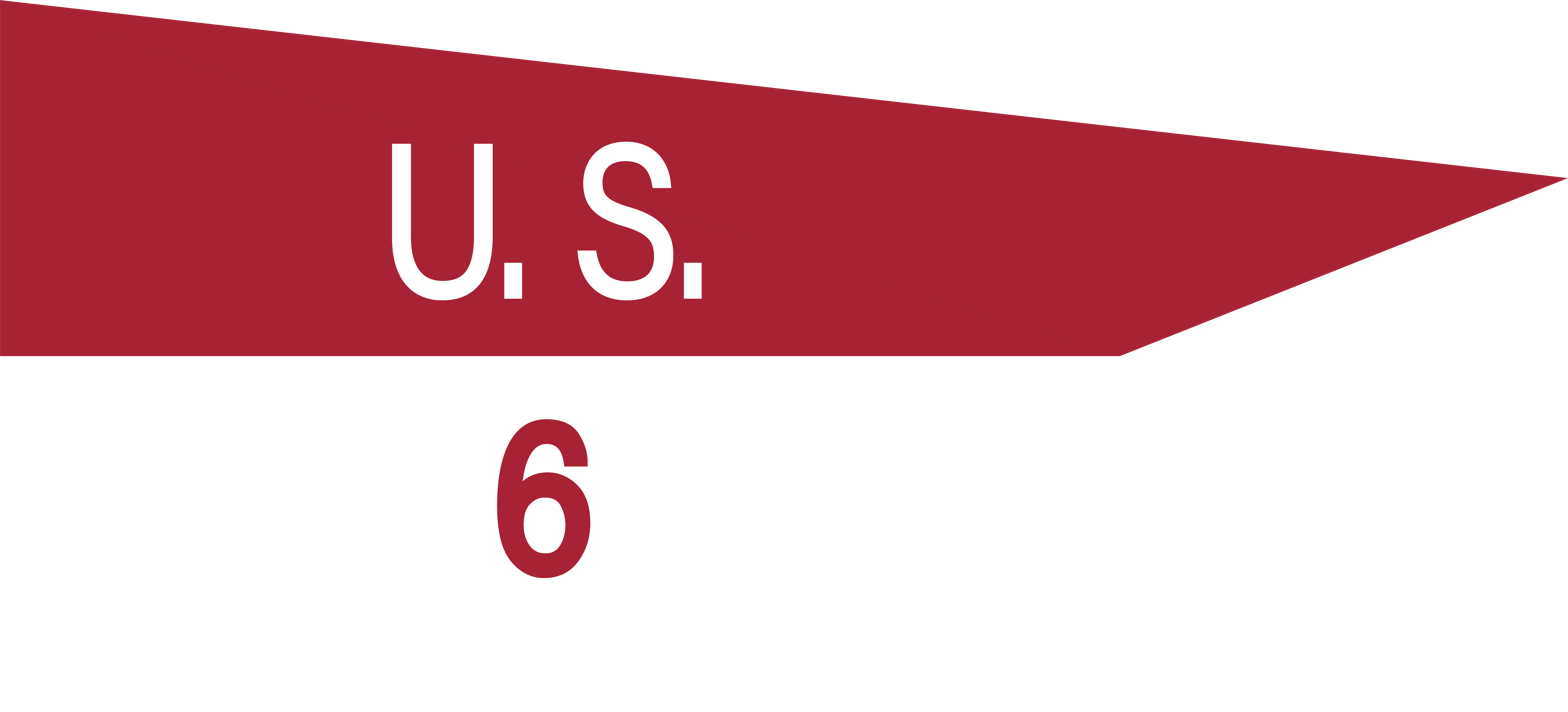
Guidon used by the regiment (c1875)

On 20 August 1877, several bands of renegade Apaches crossed into Arizona from Mexico, and elements of the 6th Cavalry were deployed to stop them. After tracking the war party through rough country bereft of water, the troopers found that the trail went into the land of the San Carlos Reservation. The detachment commander sent a telegram asking permission to enter the land, but the troopers were forced to act before a response was given. The Warm Springs Indians, or the Chíhéne, attempted a breakout from the reservation, and CPT Tupper led Troop G with elements of B, H, L, and M on a rapid pursuit. Between 9–10 September, a series of running gun battles left 12 Indians killed and 13 wounded, and the rest were returned to reservation land. Smaller encounters happened on 13 and 18 December 1877, and 7 January and 5 April 1878. While patrolling near the Mexican border, a flash flood swept away LT Henely, so LT Rucker plunged in with his horse in order to save his classmate and friend, only to be swept away himself. The death by drowning of these two officers was universally lamented by the regiment, and by the people of Arizona, who knew them well. The regiment continued to patrol the territory despite the loss of these officers, and engaged the Indians in minor battles until 1880.

While scouting in the San Andres Mountains in New Mexico on 9 April 1880, a detachment of C Troop and L Troop under CPT McClellan happened upon a squadron of Buffalo soldiers from the 9th Cavalry Regiment engaged in a losing fight with Victorio's Apaches. CPT McClellan led a charge which dispersed the Indians and relieved the 9th. After this incident, Victorio launched numerous raids, but was repelled on 7 May by E Troop under CPT Adam Kramer at the Battle of Ash Creek. Despite a dogged pursuit, Victorio escaped and continued his raids. Nearly the entire regiment was involved in constant patrolling to catch him, but the Apache Chief managed to attack the overland stage near Fort Cummings and killed the young son of CPT Madden, who was visiting from college, and planning on visiting his father for the summer.

In the summer of 1881, Troops D and E along with a company of Apache Scouts were led by General Eugene Asa Carr in the Battle of Cibecue Creek. In this battle, the Apache Scouts revolted and turned on the cavalrymen and in the fierce fight CPT Hentig along with 6 men were killed, and 2 wounded, but the Apache medicine man, Nock-ay-det-klinne, was killed as well. The troopers were forced to withdraw, but they had completed the expedition's goal. When the command returned to Fort Apache on 1 September, they found it to be under attack, and in the following Battle of Fort Apache, the Indians were driven off for the loss of three soldiers wounded. The White Mountain Apaches surrendered to the Agency shortly after. The year of 1881 was a time of hard scouting in the Arizona and New Mexico deserts and canyons, chasing elusive bands of renegade Apaches, with little reward, until April 1882.

On 28 April 1882, CPTs Tupper and Rafferty led 39 Troopers from G and M Troops, along with 45 Apache Scouts across the Mexican border to the Sierra Enmedio near the town of Los Huerigos. Here, the command discovered a band of Apache in camp, believing that they were safe from the cavalry so long as they were in Mexico. While the men moved into position, they were spotted by a small food-gathering party, and the fighting commenced. The Apache chief, Loco, called out to the Apache Scouts in an attempt to get them to betray the Americans, but this angered them and they cursed him and fired faster. Having only three rounds per man remaining, CPT Tupper ordered a withdrawal where he was joined by 9 other Troops of the 6th Cavalry under COL James W. Forsyth. The Indians lost 14 warriors killed and 7 women, for the loss of 1 American killed and 2 wounded. Returning the next day, COL Forsyth found the Apache camp deserted. On 17 July 1882, Troops E, I and K of the 6th Cavalry joined with elements of the 3rd U.S. Cavalry Regiment in the Battle of Big Dry Wash. Here, they defeated Apache war leader Na-tio-tish in a pitched battle, where two 6th Cavalry officers earned the Medal of Honor; LT Frank West and LT Thomas Cruse.

Throughout the rest of 1882 and 1883, the 6th Cavalry was constantly scouting and on guard against the Chiricahua raids from south of the border. In March 1883, GEN Crook took I Troop under CPT Adna Chaffee on an expedition to the Sierra Madres in Mexico where they captured 400 hostile Apache and their chiefs. In June 1884, the 6th Cavalry exchanged stations with the 4th Cavalry Regiment in the New Mexico Territory. They had served in Arizona for nine years and had fought in countless small actions during their time there. In New Mexico, the Regiment was headquartered at Fort Bayard with the Troops spread out across the territory. In May 1885, the regiment briefly returned once more to Arizona to engage their old enemies, the Arizona Apache renegades who had broken from the reservation and fled south. The troopers pursued them 500 miles into Mexican territory and patrolled the border until July 1886, preventing these renegades from returning to raid American settlements. In the meantime, B and F Troops were detached to Colorado in pursuit of hostile Utes and engaged them on 15 July 1885. Aside from frequent scouting in Navajo country to keep peace between the civilians and Indians, the 6th Cavalry was not engaged in any large operations during this period of time.

An 1887 letter from Charles Winters, Troop D of the 6th Cavalry, describes a soldier's experiences during the Apache Wars in New Mexico:

Letter to a friend from Commander Charles Winters, Troop D. 6th Cavalry, Fort Stanton, New Mexico. 1887.

Dear Friend!

I will now take and write to you a few lines, to let you know that I am yet alive, and doing well. I joint(sic) the Army in January, 86 and had a good fight with Geronimo and his Indians. I also had two hard fights, where i came very near getting killed, but i got true alright. I was made Corporal when i first enlisted, but have now got high enough to be in Charge of Troop D. 6th U.S. Cavalry and it requires a good man for to get that office, and that is more than i expected. Charley White from Cranbury came out with me and got in the same Troop with me, and I sent him with twenty more men out on a Scout after Indians and Charley was lucky enough to be shot down by Indians the first day, and only three of my men returned. I was very sorry but it could not be helped.

The Territory of New Mexico is a very nice place never no Winter and lots of Gold and Silver Mines all around but for all that it is a disagreeable place on account of so many Indians. I like it first rate and I think as soon as my five years are up I will go bak(sic) to Old New Jersey but not today. My name isn't Charley Winters no more since i shot that man at Jefferson Barracks when he tried to get away from me. My Captain at time told me to take the name of his son who died and so my name since then is Charles H. Wood. I will now close and hope that you will soon write and let me know how you are getting along. Give my best regards to all and to yourself and oblige.

Charlie Winters.

My address is:
Charles H. Wood
Troop D. 6th Cavalry
Fort Stanton, New Mexico

=== Ghost Dance War ===
Duty in the deserts of the Arizona and New Mexico Territory was broken in 1890 with the beginning of the Ghost Dance War. Troops of the 6th Cavalry were transported by rail to South Dakota in order to fight the resurgent Sioux. They arrived at Rapid City on 9 December 1890, and by 1 January 1891, the men had encamped near Wounded Knee Creek. Here, Troops F and I of 3rd Squadron were awaiting the arrival of K Troop at the assembly area when they heard gunfire on the White River. Suspecting this might be their comrades, Major Tupper sounded "boots and saddles" and galloped towards the gunfire through the snow. Captain Kerr, commanding K Troop, was seen defending his wagon train from Sioux warriors by F and I Troops from atop a bluff. Major Tupper formed a skirmish line and advanced his men toward the Indians despite their horses being exhausted. The Sioux warriors were heard to loudly taunt "Come on!" in English at the advancing troopers as they fired away. Nine Indians were killed and the rest were forced to retire to a nearby village. This was the sole engagement in which the 6th Cavalry fought during the war. They remained in the Northern Great Plains for some years longer, standing by near reservation land.

=== Johnson County War ===
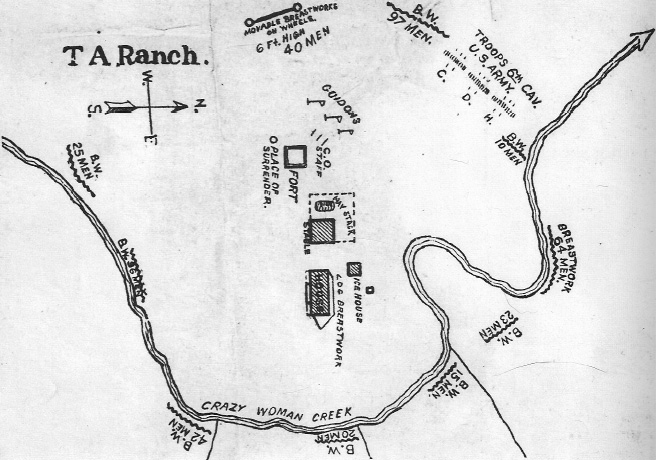
A map of the TA Ranch during the Johnson County War, depicting the positions of the Invaders, the posse, and the 6th Cavalry

In 1889, the Johnson County War began in Powder River Country, Wyoming when cattle companies started ruthlessly persecuting alleged rustlers in the area, many of whom were innocent settlers that competed with them for land, livestock and water rights. At the "Shootout at the TA Ranch," on 13 April 1892, Troops C, D, and H were called out from Fort McKinney to quell the violence. Local ranchers and cowboys were laying siege to a ranch complex (the TA Ranch) owned by the Wyoming Stock Growers Association, or WSGA. The WSGA were known to the locals as "The Invaders." Colonel J.J. Van Horn, the officer in charge of the Squadron, negotiated with Sheriff Angus to lift the siege of the ranch, and in return the Invaders were to be handed to civilian authorities. The Sixth Cavalry took possession of Frank Wolcott, a prominent member of the WSGA, and 45 other men with 45 rifles, 41 revolvers and some 5,000 rounds of ammunition, before escorting them first to Fort McKinney and then to Cheyenne, WY. While the 6th was patrolling the countryside in order to keep the peace, on 18 May 1892 cowboys from the Red Sash Ranch set fire to the Post exchange and planted a bomb in the form of gunpowder in a barracks stove. Lieutenant Charles B. Gatewood, the officer who had negotiated the surrender of Geronimo and was now serving with the 6th Cavalry, was responding to the fire and was injured by a bomb blast in a barracks; his left arm was shattered, rendering him too disabled to serve in the Cavalry. The 6th was relieved of its duties in Powder River Country later that year by the 9th Cavalry.

=== Spanish–American War ===
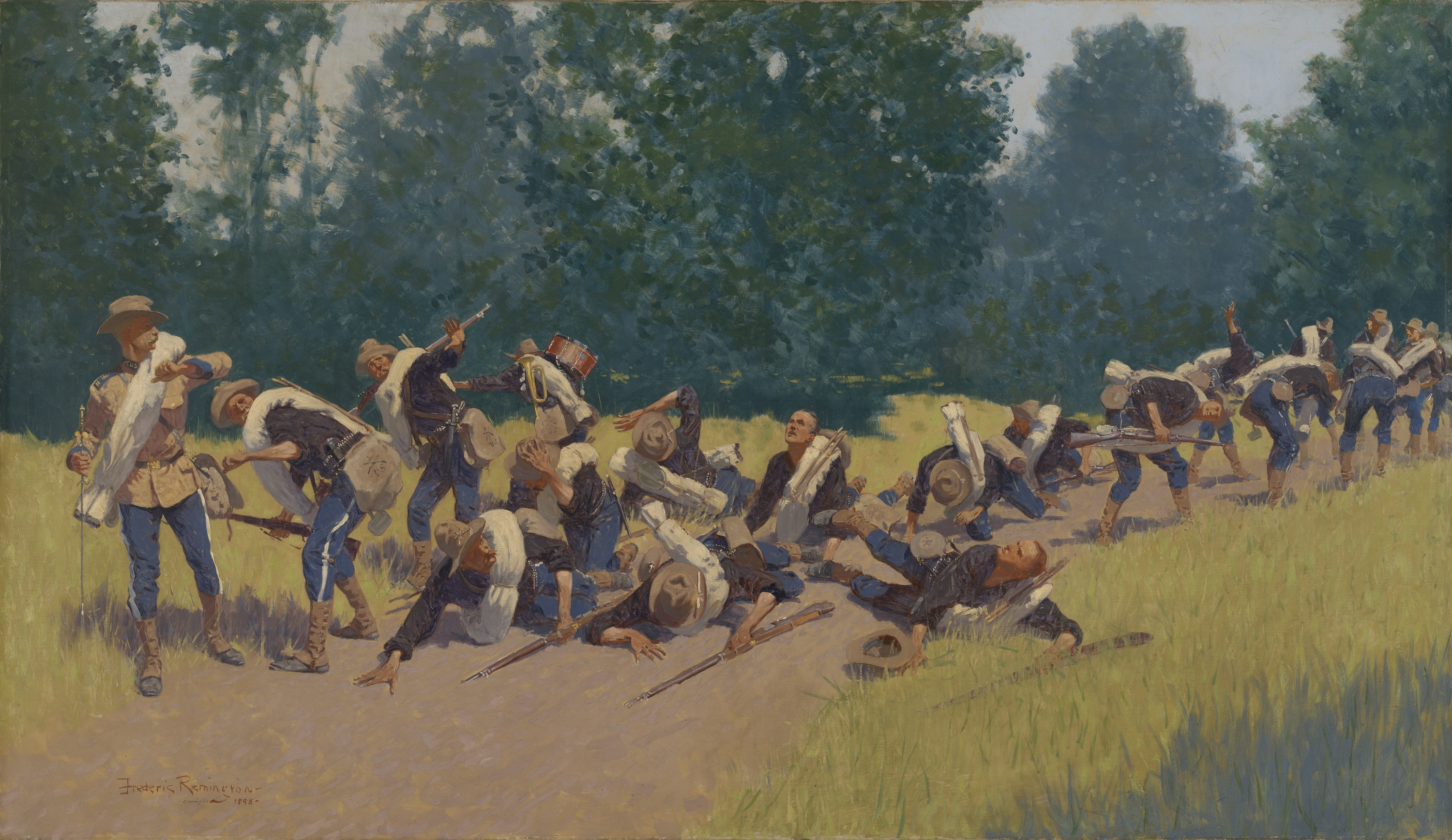
The Scream of Shrapnel at San Juan Hill, by Frederic Remington, 1898

In 1898, the Spanish–American War broke out after the USS Maine sank in Havana Harbor under mysterious circumstances. The 6th Cavalry was quickly recalled from their frontier postings and sent to camp in Florida where they awaited for transport to Cuba. After being forced to give up most of their horses and some of their men in order to fit on the ship, the 6th finally arrived in the theater of war on 24 June 1898. The 6th was commonly posted near Teddy Roosevelt's "Rough Riders," and the men gave the US Volunteers a nickname; the "Weary Walkers," because their horses were left in Florida as well. On 1 July 1898, at the start of the Battle of San Juan Hill, the troopers were forced to lay down in a thicket of vines and bushes, making it impossible to see, while Spanish fire hurtled over them. At around 9 am, the men started forward under heavy fire and clawed their way through thick vegetation headed for the top of the hill. Advance elements of the 6th passed by US troops who had been pinned down and they began to cheer, which drew the attention of Spanish gunners, who fired grape shot into the 6th Cavalry's line. Under the covering fire of Gatling Guns, the men managed to take the heights, and settled in for renewed fighting in the morning. The men held the heights until 4 July, when a truce was initiated to exchange prisoners. The 6th Cavalry continued to fight minor battles with Spanish units and guard Spanish prisoners until the end of the war.

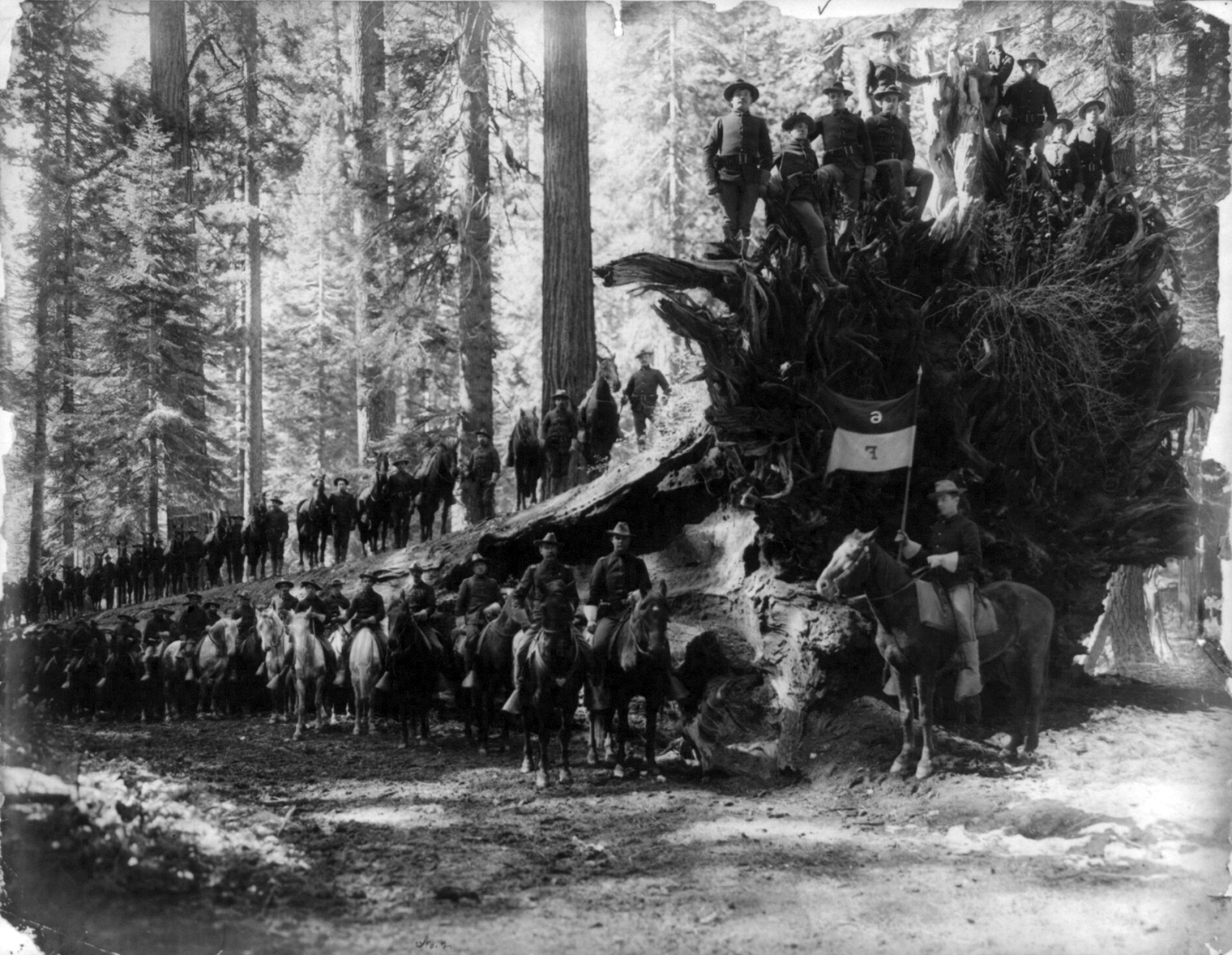
1899, Yosemite, F Troop of the 6th Cavalry. (Note the commander's wife upper right.

Upon returning home, the various 6th Cavalry troops spread out across the nation, and F Troop was even sent as far as California to guard Yosemite National Park from poachers, as the US National Park Rangers were not a powerful enough entity yet.

=== Boxer Rebellion ===
In 1900, the 6th Cavalry Regiment was part of the International China Relief Expedition with the objective of relieving the defenders of the Beijing Legation Quarter in Beijing, China during the Boxer Rebellion. The Manchu Dynasty claimed that it could not protect Western citizens from the "Righteous and Harmonious Fists," commonly known as the Boxers, but in fact Empress Dowager Cixi was actually supporting them in order to drive out the Europeans. During the march to Beijing, the 6th Cavalry acted as the expedition's scouting force and acted as pickets to protect the column from Chinese attack. Unlike in Cuba, the 6th Cavalry had their mounts for the campaign and were well suited to the cavalry role of scouting and screening. During the Battle of Peking (Beijing), the 6th played a minor role but still joined in on the massive looting of the city that followed. For the individual cavalry trooper, the China Relief Expedition was an adventure in a far off land, with only minor combat.

=== The Philippines ===
Shortly after campaigning in China, the 6th Cavalry was sent to the Philippines to join the Philippine–American War. From 1900–1903 they conducted counter-insurgency patrols and had several minor violent encounters with Emilio Aguinaldo's rebels, but their main enemy was the tropical heat and environment. In 1903, the regiment was posted to Fort Meade, South Dakota where it spent three years in garrison. In 1907, the Moro Rebellion was heating up and the 6th Cavalry was once again sent to the Philippine Islands. The Moro people were a Muslim culture living in the Sulu Archipelago and the island of Mindanao, and they held practices unacceptable to their new American rulers including slavery. The Moros also practiced a tradition called juramentado in which a devotee attempted to kill as many Christians as possible in order to gain a place in paradise. However, they made war on themselves as much as they did with their other enemies, resulting in fractured bands. The 6th Cavalry fought several engagements against the Moros in the jungles and mountains but, as it was earlier, their main enemy was the tropical environment and its diseases.

Vic Hurley, an American author who was a member of the Philippine Constabulary, wrote the book Jungle Patrol in 1938, arguing that Colonel Alexander Rodgers of the 6th Cavalry Regiment (brother of Thomas S. Rodgers) had implemented the strategy of mass graves and pig entrails:

It was Colonel Alexander Rodgers of the 6th Cavalry who accomplished by taking advantage of religious prejudice what the bayonets and Krags had been unable to accomplish. Rodgers inaugurated a system of burying all dead juramentados in a common grave with the carcasses of slaughtered pigs. The Mohammedan religion forbids contact with pork; and this relatively simple device resulted in the withdrawal of juramentados to sections not containing a Rodgers. Other officers took up the principle, adding new refinements to make it additionally unattractive to the Moros. In some sections the Moro juramentado was beheaded after death and the head sewn inside the carcass of a pig. And so the rite of running juramentado, at least semi-religious in character, ceased to be in Sulu. The last cases of this religious mania occurred in the early decades of the century. The juramentados were replaced by the amucks. ... who were simply homicidal maniacs with no religious significance attaching to their acts.

=== Mexico and World War I ===
The Mexican Revolution, which began in 1911, made security along the Mexico–United States border even less stable than it already was. In 1913, President Woodrow Wilson ordered cavalry regiments sent down to the border, among which was the 6th Cavalry Regiment. The regiment patrolled the border in the rugged terrain of the American Southwest much as they had done before against the Apaches, but it was a relatively quiet period of time. However, on 9 March 1916, Pancho Villa and his banditos raided Columbus, NM, sparking the Punitive Expedition. Many months of rough riding took the cavalrymen on wild chases throughout the Mexican deserts, but they could not capture Pancho Villa, and the 6th Cavalry returned home in February 1917. The Pancho Villa Expedition marked the first time in US military history that motorized transport was used, but the cavalry still played the dominant role, as the primitive vehicles found traversing the rough terrain difficult.

The respite would not last long however, as the United States entered World War I on the side of the Allied Powers in April 1917. The 6th embarked for France to join the American Expeditionary Forces on 16 March 1918 from Hoboken, NJ, where they were primarily tasked with remount details, military police duties, or hauling artillery. When the war ended on 11 November 1918, the 6th Cavalry remained in France for several months into 1919 and continued their remount and military police duties. They returned from St. Nazaire, France 16 JUN 1919 aboard the SS Kroonland to New York City. Upon arrival, the "Fighting Sixth" Cavalry was stationed at The Post at Fort Oglethorpe, GA from 1919 until the beginning of World War II. World War I saw the combat debut of the truck, tank, and airplane. These advances in warfare were the harbinger for the end of the horse cavalry, but the 6th Cavalry Regiment would evolve with the times.

=== Interwar period ===
The 6th Cavalry arrived at the port of Newport News, Virginia on 29 June 1919 on the USS Kroonland after performing occupation duties near Gièvres and Vendome, France. It was transferred to Camp Stuart, Virginia, and arrived there on 30 June 1919, where emergency period personnel were discharged from the service. Transferred to Fort Oglethorpe, Georgia, and arrived there on 3 July 1919. It was assigned to the 3rd Cavalry Division on 15 August 1927. Troop E was awarded the Draper Award for cavalry leadership in 1929. The regiment conducted a 1,500-mile training march from July–October 1929 through Georgia, South Carolina, and Tennessee. In April 1933, the regiment assumed command and control of Civilian Conservation Corps (CCC) District C, Fourth Corps Area until mid-1934. It supported the construction and supervision of CCC camps in Georgia, Tennessee, and Alabama, 1933–39. The regiment provided the presidential guard and escort during President Franklin D. Roosevelt’s visits to Gainesville, Georgia, and Chattanooga, Tennessee, during 1938. It was relieved on 1 December 1939 from the 3rd Cavalry Division and concurrently, reorganized and redesignated the 6th Cavalry Regiment (Horse and Mechanized). The regiment maintained habitual summer training relationships with the 155th Cavalry Brigade of the 63rd Cavalry Division (309th and 310th Cavalry Regiments), the 157th Cavalry Brigade of the 64th Cavalry Division (313th and 314th Cavalry Regiments), and the 55th Cavalry Brigade of the 23rd Cavalry Division (108th and 109th Cavalry Regiments). Assigned Reserve officers conducted summer training with the regiment at Fort Oglethorpe. Assigned to the IV Corps in October 1940.

=== World War II ===
Once America became involved in the war after the Attack on Pearl Harbor, the 6th Cavalry shed its horses and became solely a mechanized unit. Because of this pre-war experimentation, the 6th was not broken up like many Army outfits, but retained the majority of its original personnel allowing for added stability and training continuity. The 6th Cavalry Regiment was renamed the 6th Mechanized Cavalry Group (MCG), and was organized into two squadrons; the 6th SQDN and the 28th SQDN. The 6th MCG was assigned to General Patton's Third Army and arrived in Normandy between 9–10 July 1944. General Patton wanted an Army-level reconnaissance unit in order to bypass traditional reporting channels and enable quicker decision making at the field army level; this unit was to be called the Army Information Service (AIS), and the 6th MCG was chosen for the role.

==== Brittany to Belgium ====
One squadron would fulfill the duties of the AIS, while the other, in conjunction with the associated parts of the AIS squadron not needed for that role (the tank company and assault gun troop), would serve as a security force for the Army headquarters and "hip pocket" reserve for the Army commander. The two squadrons would rotate duties on a 21-day cycle, with a reconnaissance Troop being assigned to every Corps HQ, and platoons detached for every Division. When necessary, Sections (typically 2 Jeeps with an M8 Greyhound) could be detached down to the Regimental level. These detachments all reported to the Squadron operations center, which directly reported up to Third Army HQ, speeding up information flow to the Army level. During Operation Cobra in 1944, the 28th SQDN (supplemented by B TRP, 6th SQDN) provided 15 detachments spread out across the 4 Corps and 11 Divisions in the Third Army, and an additional detachment to provide command and control for AIS nodes in the Brittany Peninsula. The standard time for an AIS message to go from battlefield to Army headquarters averaged two hours, twenty minutes, while the conventional channels took eight to nine hours.

While continuing to provide reconnaissance and security for Third Army units during the Brittany Campaign, on 27 August 1944 A TRP, 28th SQDN was dispatched South to reconnoiter the Loire River from Orléans to Saumur, a distance of 100 miles. The Troop successfully completed this mission in two days, and ensured that all bridges over the river were destroyed so no German counterattack could drive into the Third Army's southern flank. Although Third Army operations covered some 475 miles at the beginning of September 1944, the 6th Cavalry moved information so quickly to Army HQ that GEN Patton was afforded an unprecedented amount of flexibility and battlefield awareness. On 5 September, LTC James H. Polk was replaced by COL Edward Fickett to command the 6th Cavalry, and LTC Polk would go on to command the 3rd MCG. On 18 September, GEN Patton ordered the creation of a Task Force consisting of the assault gun Troops (E/6th and E/28th SQDNs) and the tank company of the 6th SQDN (F CO), with minor supporting elements to assist TF Polk in operations along the Moselle River. During these operations, the tanks and assault guns provided fire support and gained valuable combat experience until 30 September.

During the month of October, rain and mud slowed AIS communications by hindering the mobility of motorcycle and Jeep couriers. In response, the 6th MCG used carrier pigeons beginning 8 October. Although slower than motorized vehicles, the birds provided a useful alternative when radio communications failed. At the beginning of November, the 6th MCG was ordered to only keep one Squadron on AIS duties to enable to other to be used for direct action. TF Fickett was created by attaching 5th Ranger Battalion, C Co 602nd Tank Destroyer Battalion, and B Co 293rd Engineer Battalion to 6th SQDN. TF Fickett was committed to XX Corps during the attack on the Saar River, and prepared to engage the German 36th Infantry Division on 2 December 1944. Advancing on a two-mile front against the towns of Carling and L'Hôpital, TF Fickett met fierce German resistance but managed to clear their objectives on 5 December. This action destroyed a salient in the American lines that threatened the advance and prevented any Corps level forces from being drawn away from the battle. On 8 December, TF Fickett relieved the 11th Infantry Regiment of the 5th Infantry Division and eventually relieved the entire division. The Task Force covered the frontage of an entire division in an economy of force mission. On 16 December, 6th and 28th SQDNs switched their duties (6th went to AIS and 28th went to TF Fickett), and the TF was reassigned to support III Corps.

==== The Battle of the Bulge ====
TF Fickett was forced to leave the 5th Ranger BN behind as they moved North on Christmas Eve, 1944 to support III Corps in the Battle of the Bulge. Operating on the flanks of the 4th Armored Division and the 26th Infantry Division in the vicinity of Neufchateau, TF Fickett advanced on the enemy on Christmas Day. By protecting the western flank of the 4th AD, the cavalrymen allowed that division to reach the surrounded paratroopers of the 101st Airborne Division at Bastogne on the following day. "The 6th MCG’s actions during III Corps' relief of Bastogne are highly typical of traditional American cavalry operations... Protecting open flanks and maintaining communications between scattered units were long part of horse cavalry doctrine and practiced often. By their actions, the troopers of the 6th MCG contributed immeasurably to the success of the 4th AD in relieving the 101st Airborne Division. Furthermore, they had additionally conducted a true reconnaissance mission along the flank of the corps, and their efforts aided a subsequent attack by two full divisions.

On 2 January, the 28th SQDN was attached to the 35th Infantry Division facing Harlange to allow them to divert an infantry battalion to the main effort in the north. Meanwhile, the 6th Squadron patrolled the rear areas of the 26th and 35th ID's until 9 January when both Squadrons moved up to the Harlange pocket. Although not in the Group's orders, COL Fickett ordered an attack, and, using combined arms maneuver, the 6th MCG seized the towns of Harlange, Watrange, and Sonlez where they linked up with the 90th Infantry Division. The Germans in the area had held off the 26th, 35th, and 90th IDs for eleven days, but the 6th MCG defeated them and seized eight 88mm guns, five Nebelwerfer launchers, and 300 prisoners. For their actions in this battle, the 6th Mechanized Cavalry Group was awarded the Presidential Unit Citation.

==== Advance into Germany ====
On 20 January 1945, 28th SQDN relieved the 26th ID and promptly seized a bridgehead over the Wiltz River, the town of Winseler, and then the town of Wiltz. The Cavalry continued the advance and maintained the lines of communication between III Corps and XII Corps as the Third Army attacked across the Our River. By 4 February, TF Fickett was given a five-mile frontage to cover on the opposite side of the Siegfried Line, so they were given the 1255th Combat Engineer BN to assist in improving their positions. On 12 February, the 1255th Engineers seized the town of Vianden with the assistance of the 6th MCG's assault guns and tanks, setting the stage for TF Fickett's attack across the Our River. On 14 February, the engineers left the Task Force. On 19 February, TF Fickett was at the southern end of III Corps' line and its mission was to attack across the river in order to fix the German defenders there to prevent them from interfering with VIII Corps' main effort. German resistance was fierce, and B TRP, 28th SQDN lost 27 men near the town of Viandan. Enemy resistance faltered by 24 February, and TF Fickett attacked towards the towns of Waxweiler, Bitburg, and Mauel in Germany. On 28 February, the 6th MCG crossed the Prüm River and engaged the Germans in a pitched battle to take the town of Waxweiler and the surrounding high ground. In the fight to clear the roads east of Waxweiler, one platoon of the 6th SQDN had every single NCO become a casualty in one day’s fighting. In a rough two-day fight, TF Fickett crossed the Nims River at Lasel and continued moving east, culminating their advance with the seizure of Neuheilenbach on 4 March.

On 5 March, the 6th MCG was sent to protect VIII Corps' Northern flank. Here they assisted the 87th Infantry Division and the 11th Armored Division as they attacked east across the Rhine River. On 26 March, TF Fickett was ordered to pass through the two divisions and serve as the Corps' advance guard into Germany. For this mission, TF Ficket consisted of the 6th and 28th SQDNs of the 6th MCG, 1 BN of artillery, 2 Tank Destroyer COs, 1 CO of Engineers, and 2 Infantry COs of the 76th Infantry Division. TF Fickett further divided itself into five independent Task Forces centered around the Reconnaissance Troops. On 27 March 1945 the advance began and moved swiftly. The next day, 28th SQDN encountered the 6th SS Mountain Division Nord in the town of Schmitten, Germany. A platoon from C TRP was ambushed and shattered by the SS soldiers as well as the platoon that came to rescue them. By the end of the day, the cavalrymen suffered 36 casualties including a tank, a tank destroyer and every Jeep that entered the town. SS resistance was so great, that the TF bypassed Schmitten altogether. By the 29th, the TF had traveled 50 miles and encountered only sporadic German resistance. By the end of March, TF Fickett was stripped of its Tank Destroyer and Infantry augmentations, and was sent to act as a rear guard for the VIII Corps advance to round up German stragglers bypassed by the rapids columns of advancing armor and infantry.

On 11 April, Third Army began advancing toward Czechoslovakia, and 6th MCG was split into two elements; 28th SQDN committed a TRP to act as a liaison between XX Corps and VIII Corps, while 6th SQDN operated in a security role on the edges of the VIII advance. On 15 April, the 6th MCG crossed the Saale River, fighting their way through light German resistance, and encouraging pockets of Germans to surrender, or bypassing those who didn't and reporting their location to the following larger forces. Seizing and securing bridges for the VIII Corps advance, the 6th Cavalry entered Czechoslovakia on 20 April 1945. On 12 April, Third Army was ordered to assault into Bavaria, the "National Redoubt" of Nazi Germany. While Third Army advanced into Bavaria, VIII Corps and the 6th MCG remained in Czechoslovakia along defensive position on the Weisse Elster River between Gornitz and Rossbach. The Cavalrymen's last attack occurred on 6 May when they drove across the river, but were stopped on 7 May due to the ceasefire.

The 6th Mechanized Cavalry Group's exemplary service during the Second World War acting as Army level reconnaissance led to their deserved nickname; "Patton's Household Cavalry." The Regiment would not go home immediately after the war, however, and it remained as part of the United States Constabulary in West Berlin until 1957.

=== Cold War ===
On 20 December 1948, the former 6th Cavalry Regiment was reorganized and redesignated as the 6th Armored Cavalry. The regiment returned to the United States from Germany in 1957 during Operation Gyroscope and was stationed at Fort Knox, Kentucky. Inactivated in 1963, the regiment reactivated four years later at Fort Meade, Maryland. In April 1968 the regiment was deployed to assist the suppression of the 1968 Washington, D.C. riots. On 31 March 1971 the regiment was reduced to just the 1st Squadron, which departed for Fort Bliss, Texas. The 1st Squadron was inactivated there on 21 June 1973.

The lineage of the former Troop A, 6th Armored Cavalry was redesignated on 22 June 1973 as Headquarters and Headquarters Troop, 1st Squadron, 6th Cavalry, assigned to the 1st Cavalry Division, and activated at Fort Hood, Texas. The lineage of the former Troop B, 6th Armored Cavalry was redesignated on 1 July 1974 as Headquarters and Headquarters Troop, 2nd Squadron, 6th Cavalry, and activated at Fort Knox, Kentucky (organic elements concurrently constituted and activated). Members of 2nd Squadron, 6th Cavalry, located at Fort Knox, Kentucky, were involved in testing of both the M-1 Abrams (H Company) and M-3 Bradley (E Troop) in the 1980s. The 2nd Squadron was inactivated on 30 May 1986 at Fort Knox, and then soon thereafter reactivated on 16 July 1986 at Fort Hood, Texas. Later it was assigned to the 11th Aviation Brigade of VII Corps in Germany.

In the summer of 1974, the Army decided to implement one of the recommendations of the Howze Board and created an air cavalry combat brigade. The assets of the 2nd Brigade, 1st Cavalry Division, commanded by Col. Charles E. Canedy, were used to create the 6th Cavalry Brigade (Air Combat). 1st Squadron, 6th Cavalry, was transferred to the new brigade on 21 February 1975. The brigade served as a test bed for new concepts involving the employment of attack helicopters on the modern battlefield. (The 6th Cavalry Brigade's lineage is separate from the lineage of the 6th Cavalry Regiment.) Later, in the fall of 1990, two subordinate units of the 6th Cavalry Brigade (Air Combat) deployed in Iraq during Operation Desert Shield/Desert Storm. One of those units was 2nd Battalion, 158th Aviation Regiment, a Chinook battalion from Fort Hood.

On 15 December 1995, the 1st Squadron was inactivated at Fort Hood, and the 4th Squadron was also inactivated in late 1995. Thus only the 3rd Squadron remained at Fort Hood. By this time the 6th, through activations and inactivations, had long since transitioned from armor to aviation. The 1st Squadron was reactivated in July 1996 in Korea.

On 16 July 1986, four days after becoming the first unit to receive the AH-64A Apache helicopter, the 3rd Squadron, 6th Cavalry reactivated and reflagged as the 7th Squadron, 17th Cavalry. The 3-6 CAV call sign "Heavy Cav" draws on the 7-17 CAV lineage. Following the 7-17 CAV’s return from a distinguished tour in Vietnam, it became the United States Army's only Attack Helicopter Squadron with more AH-1 Cobras than any other unit. This lent itself to the name "Heavy Cav" which was subsequently adopted by 3-6 CAV as their call sign. The squadron served with distinction at Fort Hood from 1986 to 1996.

In December 1996, 3-6 CAV received orders to deploy to the Republic of Korea. Several months later, the squadron, consisting of 24 Apaches, stood ready to fight at Camp Humphreys, Korea. Assigned to the Eighth United States Army, its mission was to provide a screening force on the peninsula's Western coast. In May 2002 the unit was transferred, less personnel and equipment, to Fort Hood, TX in order to be outfitted with the AH-64D. On 15 June 2006, the 3rd Squadron, 6th Cavalry was inactivated and its personnel reflagged as the 4th Battalion, 2nd Aviation Regiment, assigned to the Combat Aviation Brigade, 2d Infantry Division.

=== War on terrorism ===
In February 2003 2nd and 6th Squadrons were deployed to Kuwait to prepare for the 2003 invasion of Iraq. The units were accompanied by their group command unit, the 11th Aviation Brigade, and supporting AH-64 repair unit, the 7th Battalion, 159th Aviation Regiment, all hailing from Storck Barracks in Illesheim, Germany. When units began making way into Iraq the 2nd and 6th Squadrons accompanied by several other units making up Task Force 11 flew into combat and became a part of Operation Iraqi Freedom. The 2nd Squadron left Iraq to return to Germany and case their colors until return from the Unit Field Training Program at Ft. Hood TX, where their AH-64A Apaches were converted to AH-64D Apache models. Meanwhile in Iraq, the 6th Squadron was performing combat support and convoy safety operations until the unit received orders to return to home station in Germany. After returning to Illesheim and regaining full fighting strength the 6th Squadron received their sister squadron back into Storck Barracks. Together the 2nd and 6th Squadrons trained and began readiness to redeploy in support of combat operations in Iraq and Afghanistan. During the Army Transformation the squadrons lost their command when the 11th Aviation Group cased its colors in June 2005, the units were absorbed by the 1st Infantry Division and redesignated, thus closing another chapter of the Fighting Sixth.

On 4 January 2005 2nd Squadron deployed from Germany to Afghanistan absorbing elements from other units to become Task Force Sabre. CH-47 Chinooks, UH-60 Black Hawks, AH-64 Apaches and the necessary support elements composed the aviation task force which deployed to support the NATO mission in Afghanistan.

In 2005 and 2006 as a part of the Army Transformation, squadrons of the regiment were again reorganized, as the Army eliminated from its rolls those OH-58D Kiowa Warrior units designated as attack battalions in light infantry divisions. Several of these attack battalions were reflagged as squadrons of the 6th Cavalry Regiment, replacing AH-64 squadrons that were then redesignated as Armed Reconnaissance Battalions:

- 1st Squadron, 6th Cavalry – 1st Infantry Division – Fort Riley, Kansas
- 2nd Squadron, 6th Cavalry – 25th Infantry Division (Light) – Schofield Barracks, Hawaii
- 4th Squadron, 6th Cavalry – 7th Infantry Division – Fort Lewis, Washington
- 6th Squadron, 6th Cavalry – 10th Mountain Division (LI) – Fort Drum, New York

In 2006, 2nd Squadron deployed with its parent unit, the Combat Aviation Brigade, 25th Infantry Division, from Wheeler Army Airfield to Iraq. The squadron was recognized with the Order of Daedalians' 2006 Brig. Gen. Carl I. Hutton Memorial Award for their safety record in preparation for the deployment. The Squadron returned to Hawaii in 2007 having lost only one aircrew to hostile fire.

In 2007, 1st Squadron and 4th Squadron deployed to Iraq. The squadrons along with 1st Squadron's parent brigade, the Combat Aviation Brigade, 1st Infantry Division, replaced 2nd Squadron and its parent brigade. 4th Squadron returned to Fort Lewis during August and September 2008. In October 2008, 1st Squadron began to return to Fort Carson, being replaced by 6th Squadron. 6th Squadron has now taken over operations in Iraq with its parent brigade, the Combat Aviation Brigade, 10th Mountain Division (Light Infantry).

From August 2015 to April 2016 3-6 CAV deployed to the Middle East in support of Operations Spartan Shield and Inherent Resolve. The 3-6 CAV served with distinction during this deployment, to include selection as the 2015 Department of the Army LTG Ellis D. Parker Award Winner in the Combat Category and the Overall Best Aviation Battalion in the Army.

=== Modernization ===
On 16 March 2015, the 3rd Squadron, 6th Cavalry Regiment, was activated at Fort Bliss, Texas, and assigned to the Combat Aviation Brigade, 1st Armored Division. Again, 3rd Battalion, 6th Cavalry was established as the Army's first heavy attack reconnaissance squadron formed as part of the 2015 Army Aviation Restructuring Initiative. This reconfiguration assigned three AAI RQ-7 Shadow unarmed drone platoons to the battalion's 24 AH-64D Apache Attack Helicopters.

== Current status ==
- 1st Squadron was the attack-reconnaissance squadron of the 1st Infantry Division Combat Aviation Brigade. The squadron was deactivated on 9 December 2025.
- 2nd Squadron is the attack-reconnaissance squadron of the 25th Infantry Division Combat Aviation Brigade, stationed at Wheeler Army Airfield, Hawaii
- 3rd Squadron is the attack-reconnaissance squadron of the 1st Armored Division Combat Aviation Brigade, stationed at Fort Bliss, Texas
- 4th Squadron was the attack-reconnaissance squadron of the 16th Combat Aviation Brigade. The squadron was deactivated on 11 December 2025.
- 6th Squadron was the attack-reconnaissance squadron of the 10th Mountain Division Combat Aviation Brigade. The squadron was deactivated on 12 December 2025.

== Lineage ==
Cavalry branch insignia

- Constituted 4 May 1861 in the Regular Army as the 3d Cavalry Regiment
- Regiment (except Companies A & B) organized 18 June 1861 at Pittsburgh, Pennsylvania.
- Company A organized June–October 1861 in Maryland and the District of Columbia
- Redesignated 3 August 1861 as the 6th Cavalry Regiment
- Company B organized 16 August 1861 at Camp Scott, Pennsylvania
- Cavalry companies officially redesignated as troops in 1883.
- Assigned 15 August 1927 to the 3d Cavalry Division, and stationed at Fort Oglethorpe, Georgia.
- A Troop consolidated 14 October 1929 with Troop D, 6th Cavalry Regiment, (organized in 1861) and consolidated unit designated as Troop A, 6th Cavalry Regiment.
- Relieved 1 December 1939 from assignment to the 3rd Cavalry Division, and moved by Road March to Fort Benning, Georgia on 11 April 1940.
- Regiment moved from Fort Benning by road 5 March May 1940 to Alexandria, Louisiana, and arrived on 8 May 1940.
- Regiment departed Alexandria, Louisiana on 27 May 1940 via Road March, and arrived at Fort Oglethorpe 30 May 1940.
- Regiment retraced their steps to Alexandria, Louisiana on 13 August 1940, and arrived 21 August 1940.
- Regiment road marched to Ragley, Louisiana on 26 July 1941, and arrived on 1 October 1941.
- Regiment road marched to Chester, South Carolina on 6 November 1941, and arrived 1 December 1941. Regiment immediately returned to Fort Oglethorpe.
- Regiment performed its last road march as a horse cavalry unit when it left Fort Oglethorpe, and moved to Camp Blanding, Florida on 18 February 1942.
- Regiment reorganized and redesignated 21 July 1942 as the 6th Cavalry Regiment, Mechanized. Troop B reorganized and redesignated as Troop E, 6th Cavalry, Mechanized.
- Regiment moved by road march to Fort Jackson on 2 November 1942.
- Regiment moved again by road march to Fort Oglethorpe on 16 April 1943.
- Regiment participated in Maneuvers at Lebanon, Tennessee from 18 April 1943 to 20 June 1943, and then road marched to Fort Jackson.
- Regiment staged at Camp Shanks, New York from 8 October 1943 until 12 October 1943, when they deployed from the New York Port of Embarkation for England.
- Regiment arrived in Tanderagee, Northern Ireland on 18 October 1943, where they prepared to reorganize for their D-Day assignment.
- Regiment broken up 1 January 1944 and its elements reorganized and redesignated as follows:

=== 6th Cavalry group ===
- Headquarters and Headquarters Troop reorganized and redesignated on 1 January 1944 as Headquarters and Headquarters Troop, 6th Cavalry Group, Mechanized with 6th and 28th Cavalry Reconnaissance Squadrons attached.
- Group landed in France on 9 July 1944, when they were assigned to the Third Army as "Patton’s Household Cavalry".
- Group was recommitted to combat near St. Avold, France on 1 December 1944
- Group entered Luxembourg on 31 December 1944 to locate German forces at or near Bastogne.
- Group encountered German forces between the 26th infantry Division and 35th Infantry Division in the lintage-Saar area, where it remained until 13 January 1945.
- Group entered Germany on 25 February 1945 with VIII Corps, and attacked through Bauler, Waxweiler, and Lasel; mopped up along the Berlin Autobahn; and protected VIII Corps' southern flank.
- Group was located at Sonnenberg, Germany on 14 August 1945
- Headquarters and Headquarters Troop, 6th Cavalry Group, Mechanized, converted and redesignated 1 May 1946 as Headquarters and Headquarters Troop, 6th Constabulary Regiment.
- Redesignated 2 February 1948 as Headquarters, Headquarters and Service Troop, 6th Constabulary Regiment
- Headquarters, Headquarters and Service Troop, 6th Constabulary Regiment converted and redesignated 20 December 1948 as Headquarters and Headquarters Company, 6th Armored Cavalry Regiment. Troop A, 6th Constabulary Squadron Converted and redesignated as Company A, 6th Armored Cavalry Regiment (Former Troop D, 6th Cavalry, concurrently withdrawn from Company A, 6th Armored Cavalry – hereafter separate lineage)

=== 6th Cavalry Reconnaissance Squadron, Mechanized ===
- 1st Squadron reorganized and redesignated on 1 January 1944 as the 6th Cavalry Reconnaissance Squadron, Mechanized. Troop E, 2nd Squadron, 6th Cavalry Regiment, Mechanized Reorganized and redesignated as Troop F, 6th Cavalry Reconnaissance Squadron, Mechanized. Regiment remained attached to 6th Cavalry Group, but was moved to Gilford, Northern Ireland for deployment training.
- Squadron moved to England on 13 May 1944.
- Squadron landed in France on 10 July 1944.
- Squadron entered Luxembourg on 25 December 1944.
- Squadron entered Belgium on 28 December 1944.
- Squadron entered Germany on 23 February 1945.
- Squadron was at Hildburghausen, Germany on 14 August 1945.
- 6th Cavalry Reconnaissance Squadron, Mechanized, converted and redesignated 1 May 1946 as the 6th Constabulary Squadron. Troop F converted and redesignated as Troop E, 6th Constabulary Squadron.
- 6th Constabulary Squadron, converted and redesignated 20 December 1948 as the 1st Battalion, 6th Armored Cavalry Regiment. Troop E converted and redesignated as Company B, 6th Armored Cavalry.

=== 28th Cavalry Reconnaissance Squadron ===
- 2nd Squadron reorganized and redesignated on 1 January 1944 as the 28th Cavalry Reconnaissance Squadron, Mechanized. Squadron remained attached to the 6th Cavalry Group, and moved to Gilford, Northern Ireland for deployment training.
- Squadron moved to England on 13 May 1944.
- Squadron deployed to France on 10 July 1944.
- Squadron entered Luxembourg on 24 December 1944, and moved on to Belgium the same day.
- Squadron entered Germany on 24 February 1945
- Squadron was at Sonnenberg, Germany on 14 August 1945.
- 28th Cavalry Reconnaissance Squadron, Mechanized, converted and redesignated 1 May 1946 as the 28th Constabulary Squadron.
- 28th Constabulary Squadron converted and redesignated on 20 December 1948 as the 2nd Battalion, 6th Armored Cavalry Regiment.

=== 6th Armored Cavalry Regiment ===
- Battalions and companies redesignated 24 June 1960 as squadrons and troops, respectively. Troop E Reorganized and redesignated as Troop B, 6th Armored Cavalry
- Regiment inactivated 24 October 1963 at Fort Knox, Kentucky
- Regiment activated 23 March 1967 at Fort George G. Meade, Maryland
- Inactivated (less 1st Squadron) 31 March 1971 at Fort George G. Meade, Maryland.
- 1st and 2nd Squadrons inactivated 21 June 1973 at Fort Bliss, Texas)

=== 6th Cavalry Regiment ===
- Regiment reorganized and redesignated 22 June 1973 as the 6th Cavalry, a parent regiment under the Combat Arms Regimental System. 1st Squadron redesignated as Headquarters and Headquarters Troop, 1st Squadron, 6th Cavalry, assigned to the 1st Cavalry Division, and activated at Fort Hood, Texas (organic elements concurrently constituted and activated)
- 2nd Squadron redesignated 1 July 1974 as Headquarters and Headquarters Troop, 2d Squadron, 6th Cavalry, and activated at Fort Knox, Kentucky (organic elements concurrently constituted and activated)
- 1st Squadron relieved 21 February 1975 from assignment to the 1st Cavalry Division.
- Regiment withdrawn 1986 from the Combat Arms Regimental System and reorganized under the United States Army Regimental System.
- 2nd Squadron inactivated 30 May 1986 at Fort Knox, Kentucky
- 2nd Squadron activated 16 July 1986 at Fort Hood, Texas
- 1st Squadron inactivated 15 December 1995 at Fort Hood, Texas
- 1st Squadron activated 16 July 1996 in Korea
- 3rd Squadron departed Fort Hood, Texas and arrived at Camp Humphreys, near Pyongtaek in Korea, July 1996. 3rd Squadron was honored by maintaining the Regimental Colors until they were deactivated.
- 3rd Squadron inactivated [2006] and reflagged as the 4th Battalion, 2d Aviation Regiment in Korea

== Honors ==
=== Campaigns ===
- Civil War:
1. Peninsula;
2. Antietam;
3. Fredericksburg;
4. Chancellorsville;
5. Gettysburg;
6. Wilderness;
7. Spotsylvania;
8. Cold Harbor;
9. Petersburg;
10. Shenandoah;
11. Appomattox;
12. Virginia 1862;
13. Virginia 1863;
14. Virginia 1864;
15. Virginia 1865;
16. Maryland 1863
- Indian Wars:
1. Comanches;
2. Apaches;
3. Pine Ridge;
4. Oklahoma 1874;
5. Texas 1874;
6. Arizona 1876;
7. Arizona 1881;
8. Arizona 1882;
9. New Mexico 1882;
10. Colorado 1884
- War with Spain:
1. Santiago
- China Relief Expedition:
1. Streamer without inscription
- Philippine–American War:
1. Streamer without inscription
- Mexican Expedition:
1. Mexico 1916–1917
- World War I:
1. Streamer without inscription
- World War II:
1. Normandy;
2. Northern France;
3. Rhineland;
4. Ardennes-Alsace;
5. Central Europe
- Southwest Asia:
1. Defense of Saudi Arabia;
2. Liberation and Defense of Kuwait;
3. Cease-Fire;
4. Iraq 2007–2008, 4th Squadron;
5. Iraq 2007–2009, 1st Squadron;
6. Iraq 2010–2011, 1st Squadron;
7. Afghanistan 2013, 1st Squadron;
8. Iraq 2016-2017, 4th Squadron;

=== Decorations ===
- Presidential Unit Citation (Army) for HARLANGE POCKET
- Valorous Unit Award for KUWAIT;
- Army Superior Unit Award for 1996–1997;
- Valorous Unit Award for Iraq (1 June 2007 – 25 August 2008) (HRC Permanent Orders 169-17 dated 18 June 2009) 4th Squadron, 6th Cavalry
- Meritorious Unit Commendation for Iraq (3 September 2007 – 23 November 2008) (HRC Permanent Orders 173-003 dated 22 June 2009) 1st Squadron, 6th Cavalry
- Meritorious Unit Commendation for service in Iraq (2008–2009) (Orders posted 30 July 2010) 6th Squadron, 6th Cavalry
- Army Superior Unit Award for deterrence operations against North Korea (18 October 2013 to 31 December 2013) PERMANENT ORDER 055-08, dated 24 February 2015, 4th Squadron.

== Notable members ==
- Louis Henry Carpenter MOH
- Adna Chaffee
- John Connor MOH
- Henry Blake Hays
- Alexander F. Harmer
- Nicholas M. Nolan
- Richard B. Paddock
- George S. Patton
- John J. Pershing
- George Crawford Platt MOH
- George B. Selden
- Samuel H. Starr commander during the Gettysburg Campaign
- Samuel Whitside
- Charles B. Gatewood
- Britton Davis
- Chatto

== 6th Cavalry Museum ==
The 6th Cavalry Museum is located in Fort Oglethorpe, Georgia. The museum is dedicated to the regiment. It is focused on those who served at the U.S. Army Post at Fort Oglethorpe from 1902 to 1946. The museum was established in 1981 by veterans who served in the cavalry.

== See also ==
- List of United States Regular Army Civil War units
