= 6th Cavalry Brigade (United States) =

6th Cavalry Brigade 6th Tank Group 6th Armored Group 6th Cavalry Brigade (Air Combat)
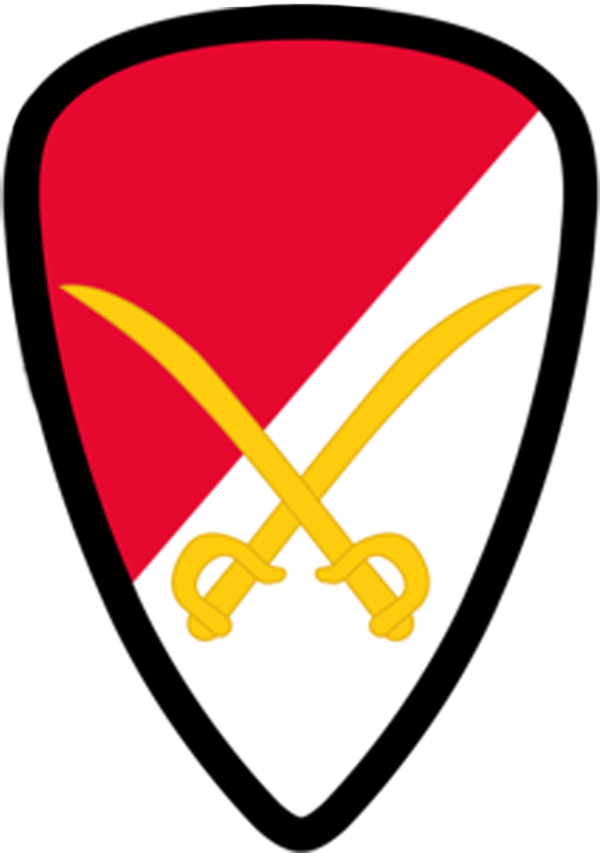
- Brigade shoulder sleeve insignia
- Active: 1927 – 1940; 1942 – 1945; 1975 – 2005
- Country: United States
- Branch: United States Army
- Type: Air Cavalry
- Size: Brigade
- Part of: III Corps
- Nickname: "Blackhorse" / "Silent Thunder"
- Equipment: Boeing AH-64 Apache; Bell OH-58 Kiowa; Sikorsky UH-60 Black Hawk
- Engagements: World War II
- Website: Veteran's Facebook

Insignia
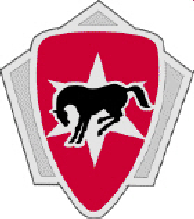
- Distinctive Unit Insignia

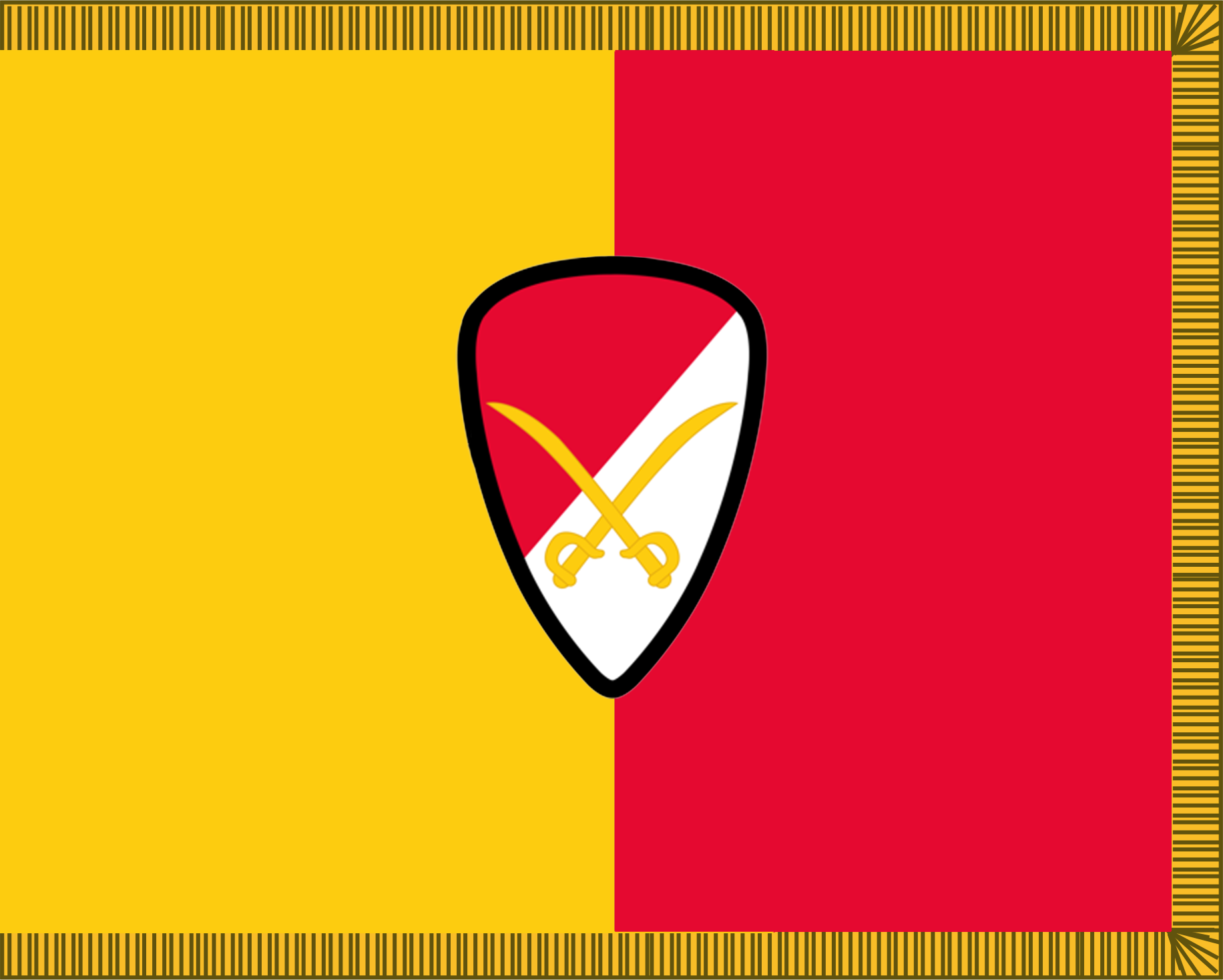
- 6th Cavalry Brigade Flag

The 6th Cavalry Brigade was a tactical formation of the United States Army which served in the Second World War before being disbanded following the end of the Cold War.

== Formation ==
On 15 August 1927 the 6th Cavalry Brigade was constituted as part of the unorganised and newly formed 3rd Cavalry Division. Until 1932 the brigade didn't maintain a headquarters and was assigned to the Seventh Corps Area. The brigade was organised as follows after formation:

- 6th Cavalry Brigade
  - Headquarters and Headquarters Troop — HQ Troop disbanded by 1932
  - 3rd Cavalry Regiment
  - 6th Cavalry Regiment
  - 6th Machine Gun Squadron — disbanded in 1928

From 1928 to 1931 the brigade was redesignated as 'Regular Army Inactive' and maintained training through an affiliation with the 14th Cavalry Regiment, and conducted training at Fort Des Moines, Iowa. On 1 May 1932 the brigade was withdrawn from the Seventh Corps Area and subsequently allocated to the Third Corps Area. During the brigade's time as part of the Third Corps Area, the regiment was deemed 'inactive'.

By July 1933 the brigade was organised with personnel from the Organized Reserves. On 1 June 1936 the brigade was withdrawn from the Third Corps Area and allotted back to the Seventh Corps Area. By December 1939 the brigade was organised in Des Moines, Iowa. However, the brigade was disbanded on 10 October 1940.

By the time the brigade was disbanded, it was organised as follows:

- 6th Cavalry Brigade
  - Headquarters and Headquarters Troop (Organized Reserves), in Des Moines, Iowa
  - 3d Cavalry Regiment, at Fort Myer, Virginia
  - 6th Cavalry Regiment, at Fort Oglethorpe, Georgia

== World War II ==
On 21 April 1942, the 6th Tank Group was constituted in the Army of the United States, continuing the lineage of the old 3rd Cavalry Brigade. On 23 April, the group was activated at Camp Bowie, Texas. On 1 February 1944 the group was redesignated as the 6th Armored Group. The group went on to fight during the Battle of Normandy, and the subsequent North West Europe Campaign, including the Crossing of the Rhine, Battle of the Bulge, and Advance into Western Germany. On 22 October 1945 the group was inactivated at Camp Myles Standish, Massachusetts, and disbanded 2 July 1952.

== Air Cavalry ==
On 21 February 1975 the 6th Cavalry Brigade was reconstituted at Fort Hood, Texas in the Regular Army and subsequently assigned to the III Corps. By 1989 the brigade added the suffix '(Air Combat)', and was organised as follows:

- 6th Cavalry Brigade (Air Combat)
  - Headquarters and Headquarters Troop, at Fort Hood, Texas
  - 1st Squadron, 6th Cavalry Regiment (18x Boeing AH-64 Apache, 13x Bell OH-58C Kiowa, 3x Sikorsky UH-60A Black Hawk)
  - 3d Squadron, 6th Cavalry Regiment (18x Boeing AH-64 Apache, 13x Bell OH-58C Kiowa, 3x Sikorsky UH-60A Black Hawk)
  - 4th Squadron, 6th Cavalry Regiment (18x Boeing AH-64 Apache, 13x Bell OH-58C Kiowa, 3x Sikorsky UH-60A Black Hawk)
  - 6th Squadron, 6th Cavalry Regiment (18x Boeing AH-64 Apache, 13x Bell OH-58C Kiowa, 3x Sikorsky UH-60A Black Hawk) — activated 6 June 1990
  - 7th Squadron, 6th Cavalry Regiment (18x Boeing AH-64 Apache, 13x Bell OH-58C Kiowa, 3x Sikorsky UH-60A Black Hawk) — Army Reserve unit, in Houston, Texas
  - 2d Battalion, 58th Aviation Regiment (Air Traffic Control)
  - 2d Battalion, 158th Aviation Regiment (32x CH-47D)

While based at Fort Hood the brigade also had a small Pathfinder detachment assigned.

In the autumn of 1990, two subordinate units of the brigade (including the 2nd Battalion, 158th Aviation Regiment), were deployed to Saudi Arabia. These units would go on to take part in Operation Desert Shield and later Operation Desert Storm.

Among the brigade commanders was Walter H. Yates Jr.

On 16 June 2005, both the 6th Cavalry Brigade and the 17th Aviation Brigade were inactivated and their assets were merged into the Combat Aviation Brigade, 2d Infantry Division, thus ending the lineage.

== Heraldry ==
=== Distinctive unit insignia ===
Description

- A silver color metal and enamel device 1 5/16 inches (3.3 cm) in height overall consisting of a red enameled shield with a silver border bearing a black bucking horse in front of a six-pointed star and surmounting overall a silver pentagon, point up.

Symbolism

- The horse and the six-pointed star, a symbol for guidance and achievement, represent the historical origin and great tradition of the Cavalry.
- The six points of the star further allude to the numerical designation of the Brigade.
- The pentagonal background, a symbol of perfection, also refers to the five campaigns credited the organization for service in France and Germany during World War II.

Background

- The insignia was approved on 21 Feb 1975.

=== Shoulder Sleeve Insignia ===
Description

- A heater-shaped shield 2 5/16 inches (5.9 cm) in width and 3 1/4 inches (8.3 cm) in height overall with a 1/8 inch (0.32 cm) black border around a field divided diagonally from upper right to lower left with scarlet above and white below and just below center two crossed yellow sabres with hilts to base
- COMBAT SERVICE IDENTIFICATION BADGE: A silver color metal and enamel device 2 inches (5.1 cm) in height consisting of a design similar to the shoulder sleeve insignia.

Symbolism

- The colors red and white are the old guidon colors of Cavalry units and the crossed sabres are adopted from the former Cavalry branch insignia.

Background

- The insignia was approved 21 Feb 1975
- (TIOH Drawing Number A-1-582)
