= 109th Cavalry Regiment =

US military unit

- Active: 1921-1940
- Country: United States
- Branch: United States Army
- Role: Cavalry
- Size: Regiment
- Motto: Hit 'Em First
- Engagements: World War I; World War II; Gulf War; War on terror

The 109th Cavalry Regiment was a cavalry unit of the United States Army from 1921 to 1940, a part of the National Guards of Alabama, North Carolina, and Tennessee. In 1940, the regiment was converted into a field artillery regiment, a battalion of which is currently active in the Tennessee Army National Guard with headquarters at Chattanooga and subordinate units in Pulaski, Lawrenceburg, Fayetteville and Dayton.

== History ==
The ancestor unit of the 109th Cavalry was constituted on 1 July 1916 in the Tennessee National Guard as a squadron of cavalry, and was organized in May 1917 from existing units (Troop A, organized 16 May 1917; Troop B, organized 4 October 1901; Troop C, organized 10 August 1916; Troop D, organized 23 August 1916) as the 1st Separate Squadron of Cavalry. Troops B, C, and D were mustered into federal service for the Pancho Villa Expedition at El Paso, Texas from July to October 1916, and were mustered out of federal service from 14 to 19 March 1917. The entire squadron was mustered into federal service from 28 July–4 August 1917 at home stations, and was drafted into federal service for World War I on 5 August 1917. The squadron, less Troop D, was converted and redesignated on 14 September 1917 as the 114th Machine Gun Battalion and assigned to the 30th Division, while Troop D was concurrently converted and redesignated as the 105th Trench Mortar Battery and assigned to the 30th Division. The 114th Machine Gun Battalion and 105th Trench Mortar Battery were demobilized on 10 April 1919 at Fort Oglethorpe, Georgia.

The 109th Cavalry Regiment was constituted in the National Guard on 2 November 1921, assigned to the 55th Cavalry Brigade of the 23rd Cavalry Division, and allotted to the National Guards of Alabama, North Carolina, and Tennessee. The 2nd Squadron headquarters was organized and federally recognized on 4 August 1921 at Hickory, North Carolina, the 1st Squadron headquarters on 20 April 1923 at Chattanooga, Tennessee, and the regimental headquarters on 6 June 1923 at Chattanooga. The regimental headquarters was successively relocated to Nashville, Tennessee, on 25 January 1926, and back to Chattanooga on 28 October 1936. On 1 July 1926, the 109th Cavalry was withdrawn from allotment to Alabama.

On 30 March 1929, the regiment was reorganized as a three-squadron regiment. The 2nd Squadron was redesignated the 3rd Squadron, and a new 2nd Squadron was organized and federally recognized with headquarters at Nashville. On 26 February 1938, the 3rd Squadron was converted and redesignated as the 2nd Battalion, 105th Engineer Regiment (part of the 30th Division). Concurrently, the 3rd Squadron and the Machine Gun Troop were withdrawn from North Carolina and allotted to Tennessee, making the 109th a wholly Tennessee-based unit. The new 3rd Squadron headquarters was organized on 2 April 1938 and federally recognized at Nashville.

Elements of the regiment were called up by the governor of North Carolina to perform the following state duties. Troop G was called up to preserve order at the trial of an African American prisoner in Halifax, North Carolina, from 23 to 24 June 1927. The 3rd Squadron performed strike duty at textile mills at Gastonia, North Carolina, in April 1929. The Machine Gun Troop and 3rd Squadron performed strike duty at textile mills at Marion, North Carolina, in August 1929, and the same duty at textile mills at Concord, Spindale, and Lincolnton, North Carolina, from 6–24 September 1934.

The 109th Cavalry Regiment's designated mobilization training station was Fort Oglethorpe, Georgia. From 1921 to 1939, the regiment conducted annual training at Fort Oglethorpe, but trained at Camp McClellan, Alabama, in 1924. The 109th Cavalry Regiment was relieved from the 23rd Cavalry Division on 1 October 1940 and converted and redesignated as the 181st Field Artillery Regiment (155 mm howitzer).

=== Commanders ===
- Colonel James Perry Fyffe (Tennessee) (6 June 1923 to his death, 19 January 1926)
- Colonel Henry Dickinson (Tennessee) (19 January 1926 – 14 September 1936)
- Colonel Ira R. Summers (Tennessee) (14 September 1936 – 1 October 1940)

=== 181st Field Artillery Regiment ===
Conversion of 109th Cavalry Regiment
109th Cavalry unit (location)	181st Field Artillery unit
Headquarters (Chattanooga)	Headquarters
HQ Troop (Columbia)	Battery A (later HQ Battery)
Medical Dept. Det. (Chattanooga)	Medical Dept. Det.
Band (Chattanooga)	Band
Machine Gun Troop (Chattanooga)	HQ Battery (later HQ Battery, 1st Bn.)
HQ, 1st Squadron (Chattanooga)	HQ, 1st Battalion
Troop A (Chattanooga)	HQ Battery (later Battery A)
Troop B (Chattanooga)	Battery B
HQ, 2nd Squadron (Nashville)	HQ, 3rd Battalion
Troop E (Nashville)	Battery E
Troop F (Nashville)	Battery F
HQ, 3rd Squadron (Nashville)	HQ, 2nd Battalion
Troop I (Clarksville)	Battery C
Troop K (Clarksville)	Battery D

The 181st Field Artillery Regiment was inducted into federal service on 24 February 1941 at home stations, and proceeded to Camp Forrest, Tennessee, where it arrived on 4 March 1941 and was assigned to the VII Corps' 75th Field Artillery Brigade. After the Japanese attack on Pearl Harbor, the regiment proceeded to Camp Roberts, California, where on 27 December 1941 it was assigned to the II Armored Corps. On 8 February 1943, the 1st Battalion was reorganized and redesignated as the 181st Field Artillery Battalion and the 2nd Battalion as the 947th Field Artillery Battalion, while on 1 March 1943, the Headquarters and Headquarters Battery was reorganized and redesignated as the Headquarters and Headquarters Battery, 181st Field Artillery Group. The 181st Field Artillery Group and 947th Field Artillery Battalion have a separate lineage.

The 181st Field Artillery Battalion was inactivated on 21 December 1945 at Camp Stoneman, California. It was reorganized and federally recognized on 14 November 1946 in southern Tennessee, with headquarters at Chattanooga, and assigned to the 30th Infantry Division. The battalion was reorganized and redesignated 27 October 1954 as the 181st Armored Field Artillery Battalion, an element of the 30th Armored Division, and was reorganized on 1 March 1959 as the 181st Artillery, a parent regiment under the U.S. Army Combat Arms Regimental System, to consist of the 1st Howitzer Battalion of the 30th Armored Division. On 1 April 1963, the regiment was reorganized with the 1st and 2nd Battalions, and was further reorganized on 1 February 1968 to consist of the 1st Battalion. On 1 May 1972, the regiment was redesignated as the 181st Field Artillery, and on 1 June 1989, it was withdrawn from the Combat Arms Regimental System and reorganized under the United States Army Regimental System. The 1st Battalion was ordered into active federal service on 9 December 1990 at home stations, and was released from active federal service on 19 May 1991 and reverted to state control. As of 2001, the regiment was assigned to the 196th Field Artillery Brigade, with the 1st Battalion active at Chattanooga. In 2021-2022, over 330 soldiers from the battalion served during a ten-month deployment to six different countries in the Middle East, supporting the United States Central Command during Operation Spartan Shield and Operation Inherent Resolve.

==== Heraldry ====
- Coat of arms: Approved 31 May 1939
- Shield: Or, a giant cactus vert between three lions rampant sable.
- Crest: On a wreath of the colors (or and vert) upon a mount vert a hickory tree proper charged with three mullets one and two argent.
- Motto: Hit 'Em First
- Description: The shield is yellow for cavalry. The giant cactus represents Mexican border duty. The three lions represent World War I service as follows. One is for Flanders, whose coat of arms is or, a lion rampant sable; one represents the Somme offensive. Somme is located in the Department of Picardy, whose arms has a black rampant lion. The third lion represents Belgium in which Ypres is located.
- Distinctive insignia: Approved 31 May 1939
  - Shield and motto of the coat of arms

==== Campaign participation credit and decorations ====
- World War I
  - Somme Offensive
  - Ypres-Lys
  - Flanders 1918
- World War II
  - New Guinea
  - Luzon
  - Southern Philippines
- Southwest Asia
  - Liberation and Defense of Kuwait
  - Cease-Fire

Headquarters Battery, 1st Battalion (Chattanooga), additionally entitled to:

- World War II
  - Northern Solomons

Decorations

- Philippine Presidential Unit Citation, streamer embroidered 17 October 1944 to 4 July 1945 (181st Field Artillery Battalion cited, Department of the Army General Orders No. 47, 1950)
