= 6th Cavalry Museum =

Military history museum in Georgia (US State)

- Established: 1981
- Dissolved: 2024
- Coordinates: 34°56′36″N 85°15′39″W
- Type: History museum
- Collections: Military
- Founder: Veterans of the 6th Cavalry

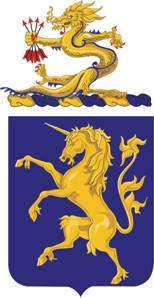
cavalry Coat of arms

The 6th Cavalry Museum is a military history museum that was located in Fort Oglethorpe, Georgia. The museum was dedicated to the 6th Cavalry Regiment, a regiment of the United States Army that began as a regiment of cavalry in the American Civil War, and is still active today. The museum focused on those who served at the U.S. Army Post at Fort Oglethorpe from 1902 to 1946. The museum was established in 1981 by veterans who served in the cavalry and closed to the public in 2023. The artifacts from the 6th Cavalry Museum are now stored and displayed at the Fort Oglethorpe Welcome Center at 10 Barnhardt Circle in Fort Oglethorpe.

== History ==
In 1981, the museum was established. By 2005, the veterans who were currently running the museum hired Chris McKeever, the museums first executive director, as they were getting too old to run it themselves entirely. McKeever retired and was succeeded by Jenny Pack in 2022. Also in 2022, the museum was updated to be a part of the Fort Oglethorpe Historic District. It was closed in 2023 and the artifacts from the 6th Cavalry Museum are now stored and displayed at the Fort Oglethorpe Welcome Center at 10 Barnhardt Circle in Fort Oglethorpe.

== Collections ==
The displayed included uniforms, weapons, photographs and vehicles from the regiment. Seminars on military history were sometimes given at the museum. The museum's collection included artifacts that were discovered in Latvia from the Eastern Front of WWII. The museum also hosted World War Two reenactments. Most activities of the museum were closed, and it operated mainly through its now closed website during the COVID-19 pandemic in 2020. It was closed in 2023 and the artifacts from the 6th Cavalry Museum are now stored and displayed at the Fort Oglethorpe Welcome Center at 10 Barnhardt Circle in Fort Oglethorpe.
