= George A. Taylor =

United States Army general

George Arthur Taylor
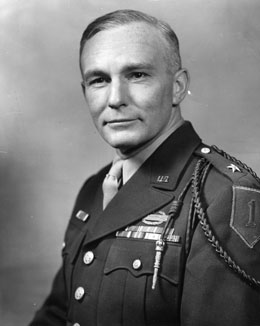
- Brigadier General George A. Taylor in 1945
- Born: February 14, 1899; Flat Rock, Illinois, United States
- Died: December 3, 1969 (aged 70); Palo Alto, California, United States
- Burial place: West Point Cemetery
- Military career
- Allegiance: United States
- Branch: United States Army
- Service years: 1922−1946
- Rank: Brigadier general
- Service number: 0-14992
- Unit: Infantry Branch
- Commands: 26th Infantry Regiment; 16th Infantry Regiment
- Conflicts: World War II
- Awards: Distinguished Service Cross; Legion of Merit (2); Bronze Star (2); Purple Heart

Brigadier General George Arthur Taylor (February 14, 1899 – December 3, 1969) was an officer of the United States Army. He is most famous for the leadership of his men in World War II on Omaha Beach during the Normandy landings, June 6, 1944, where he served as commander of the 16th Infantry Regiment, part of the famous 1st Infantry Division ("The Big Red One"), and for which he earned a Distinguished Service Cross for extraordinary heroism.

He served most of his career during the war with the 1st Infantry Division, where he was assigned as deputy commander of the division.

== Prewar years ==
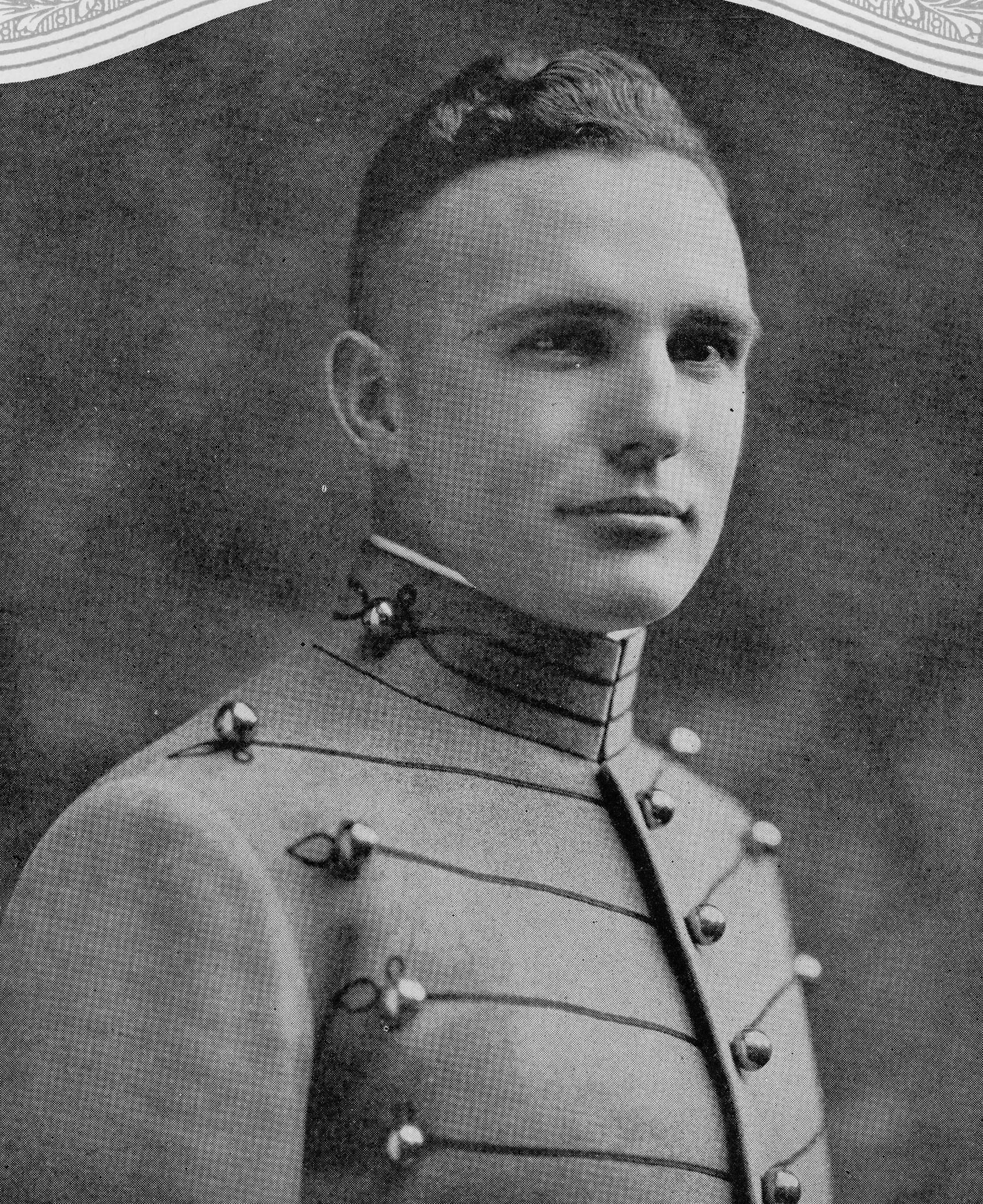
At West Point in 1922

George Arthur Taylor was born in the small village Flat Rock, Illinois, in the southeast of Illinois. His family later moved to Pryor Creek, Oklahoma, where he graduated from high school in 1916. He was a graduate of the United States Military Academy, class of 1922, and was commissioned as a second lieutenant.

During 1920s and 1930s Taylor held a variety of infantry assignments, beginning with an infantry unit at Fort Sam Houston in Texas, and followed by posts in Hawaii, Washington, North Dakota, and San Francisco.

In 1937, he was finally detached to the Command and General Staff School at Fort Leavenworth for further staff training until the next year. Then he returned to the field duty and was assigned to the Fort William McKinley at the Philippines, where he served with the Philippine Scouts.

After returning from the Philippines, Taylor was assigned to the 16th Infantry Regiment, where he was promoted to the Intelligence Officer of the 1st Battalion. In June 1941, he was transferred for a short while to the Caribbean, where he served with US Forces at the Headquarters as assistant chief of staff.

After a month of service, he returned to the United States and became Instructor of tactics at the Infantry School in Fort Benning, Georgia.

== World War II ==
After entry of the United States into the war in December 1941, Taylor was transferred to North Africa, where he served as a staff member of Advanced Echelon Amphibious Forces, Atlantic Fleet, and in October as a staff member to the Naval Operating Base Commander in Oran, Algeria. In February 1943, Taylor briefly led 26th Infantry Regiment and on 20 April of the same year, he was transferred back to the 16th Infantry Regiment, where he replaced Colonel d'Alary Fechet as regimental commander.

He then commanded the Regiment during the Allied invasion of Sicily and Omaha Beach. His executive officer during this time was James K. Woolnough, later to become a four star general.

=== Omaha Beach ===
He arrived on the beach in a later wave, about 0800. A colonel at the time, he was still the regimental commander for the 16th Infantry Regiment, which took many casualties in the initial assault. He found the remnants of his exhausted and shell-shocked men pinned down all along the seawall. He was able to motivate, organize and lead their attack inland.

He is remembered best for his most famous quote from Omaha Beach:

There are two kinds of people who are staying on this beach: those who are dead and those who are going to die. Now let’s get the hell out of here.

Taylor is sometimes confused with General Norman Cota, who was also on the beach that day, but in a different sector with a different unit, the U.S. 29th Infantry Division. Both officers rallied the troops under fire. In the film The Longest Day General Cota (played by Robert Mitchum) was given Taylor's line.

==== Distinguished Service Cross ====
For this action, George Taylor was awarded the Distinguished Service Cross. The official U.S. Army citation for Taylor's Distinguished Service Cross reads:

General Orders: Headquarters, First U.S. Army, General Orders No. 31 (July 1, 1944)
Action Date: 6-Jun-44
Name: George A. Taylor
Service: Army
Rank: Colonel
Company: Commanding Officer
Regiment: 16th Infantry Regiment
Division: 1st Infantry Division
Citation: The President of the United States of America, authorized by Act of Congress, July 9, 1918, takes pleasure in presenting the Distinguished Service Cross to Colonel (Infantry) George A. Taylor (ASN: 0-14922), United States Army, for extraordinary heroism in connection with military operations against an armed enemy while serving as Commanding Officer of the 16th Infantry Regiment, 1st Infantry Division, in action against enemy forces on 6 June 1944, in France. Colonel Taylor landed during the most crucial and threatening period of the invasion operation. Thousands of men lay huddled on a narrow beachhead, their organizations and leaders cut down by the disastrous enemy fire. Without hesitation, unmindful of the snipe and machine gun fire which was sweeping the beach, Colonel Taylor began to reorganize the units. While continuously exposed to this murderous fire, Colonel Taylor never slackened in his efforts in directing and coordinating the attack. By his initiative and leadership, he was able to clear an exit from the beach and begin moving groups of men from the crowded beachhead. This was the only exit opened in the early part of the assault and subsequent events proved it to be one of the most vital points contributing to the success of this operation. The high professional skill and outstanding courage exhibited by Colonel Taylor exemplify the highest traditions of the military forces of the United States and reflect great credit upon himself, the 1st Infantry Division, and the United States Army.

=== End of the war ===
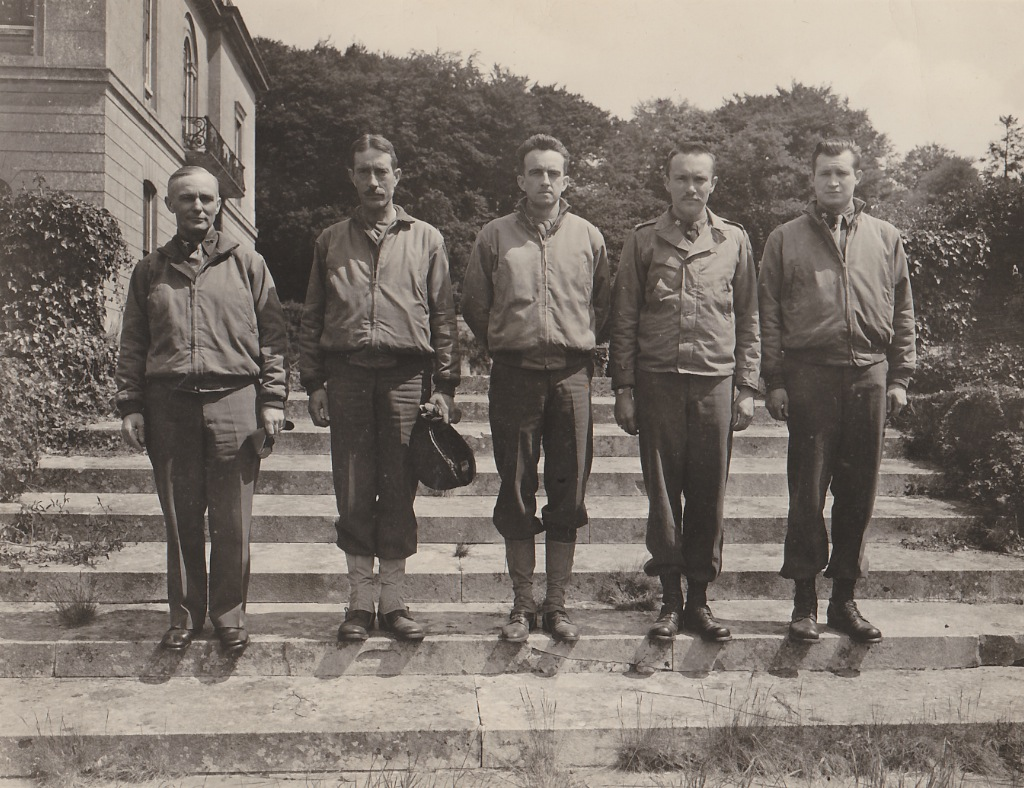
Senior commanders of the 16th Infantry Regimental Combat Team taken in England prior to the assault on Omaha Beach (D-Day). (Left to right): Colonel George A. Taylor, 16th Regiment CO; Lieutenant Colonel George W. Gibbs, 7th Field Artillery Battalion CO; Lieutenant Colonel Herbert Hicks, 2nd Battalion CO; Lieutenant Colonel Charles T. Horner Jr., 3rd Battalion CO; Lieutenant Colonel Edmond Driscoll, 1st Battalion CO.

Taylor was promoted to brigadier general on 1 August 1944 and became the assistant division commander (ADC) of the 1st Division from October 1944 to July 1945, in succession to Brigadier General Willard G. Wyman, who went to command the 71st Infantry Division. Frederick W. Gibb succeeded Taylor in command of the 16th Infantry Regiment.

During the final days of the war, the 1st Infantry Division reached the area of western Bohemia, near the city of Karlovy Vary. German XII Army Corps under command of general of artillery Herbert Osterkamp was located in this area and surrendered to the Western Allies. Command of the U.S. 1st Division accepted the German surrender and arranged a meeting in the nearby town of Loket. The representatives of the U.S. forces present were Brigadier General Taylor, Colonel Harrold and Major Wich. On the German side, it was General Osterkamp and some other staff officers.

When Taylor checked the surrender document, he noted the place of surrender was written as the city "Elbogen, Sudetenland". Taylor struck out the location "Elbogen, Sudetenland," adding a note "does not exist," and wrote "Loket, Czechoslovakia" instead, changing its name back to before the Nazi invasion. This act brought him great respect in Czechoslovakia.

== Postwar life ==
Taylor stayed with the 1st Division in Europe during the rest of 1945 and finally retired in 1946 with the rank of brigadier general on health grounds. Taylor died on December 3, 1969, in the city of Palo Alto, California, after a prolonged illness caused by a stroke. He was buried at West Point Cemetery.

Director Samuel Fuller served under Taylor during the war and mentioned his name in several of his films.

== Medals and decorations ==
Combat Infantryman Badge

Distinguished Service Cross
Legion of Merit with one Oak Leaf Cluster
Bronze Star Medal
Purple Heart
Presidential Unit Citation
World War I Victory Medal
American Defense Service Medal with Base Clasp
American Campaign Medal
European-African-Middle Eastern Campaign Medal with 8 service stars and Arrowhead device
World War II Victory Medal
Army of Occupation Medal
French Croix de Guerre 1939–1945 with Palm
Order of the Patriotic War Second Class (Union of Soviet Socialist Republics)
Czechoslovak Order of the White Lion
Czechoslovak War Cross 1939-1945

== Bibliography ==
- Omaha Beachhead. American Forces in Action. United States Army Center of Military History. 1945. CMH Pub 100-11. Archived from the original on June 22, 2009.
