= Frederick W. Gibb =

United States Army general (1908–1968)

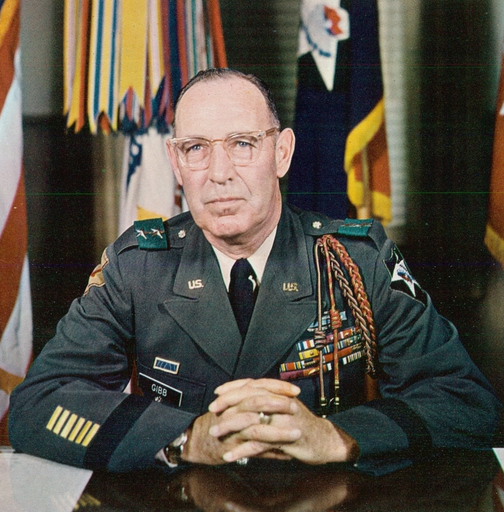
- Gibb as 2nd Infantry Division commander c. 1960
- Born: July 24, 1908; New York City, New York, United States
- Died: September 6, 1968 (aged 60); Andrews Field, Maryland, United States
- Burial place: Arlington National Cemetery, Virginia, United States
- Military career
- Allegiance: United States
- Branch: United States Army
- Service years: 1933–1961
- Rank: Major General
- Service number: 0-19222
- Unit: Infantry Branch
- Commands: 3rd Battalion, 16th Infantry Regiment; 16th Infantry Regiment; 2nd Infantry Division
- Conflicts: World War II
- Awards: Army Distinguished Service Medal; Silver Star; Legion of Merit (2); Bronze Star (3)

Major General Frederick William Gibb (July 24, 1908 – September 6, 1968) was a United States Army officer who served with distinction during World War II. Gibb served mostly with the 16th Infantry Regiment, part of the famous 1st Infantry Division (nicknamed "The Big Red One"), throughout most of the 1st Division's involvement in the conflict and took part in the Normandy landings. Continuing with his military career even after the war, his last assignment was as the commander of the 2nd Infantry Division ("Indianhead") at Fort Benning, Georgia, before retiring in 1961.

== Early military career ==
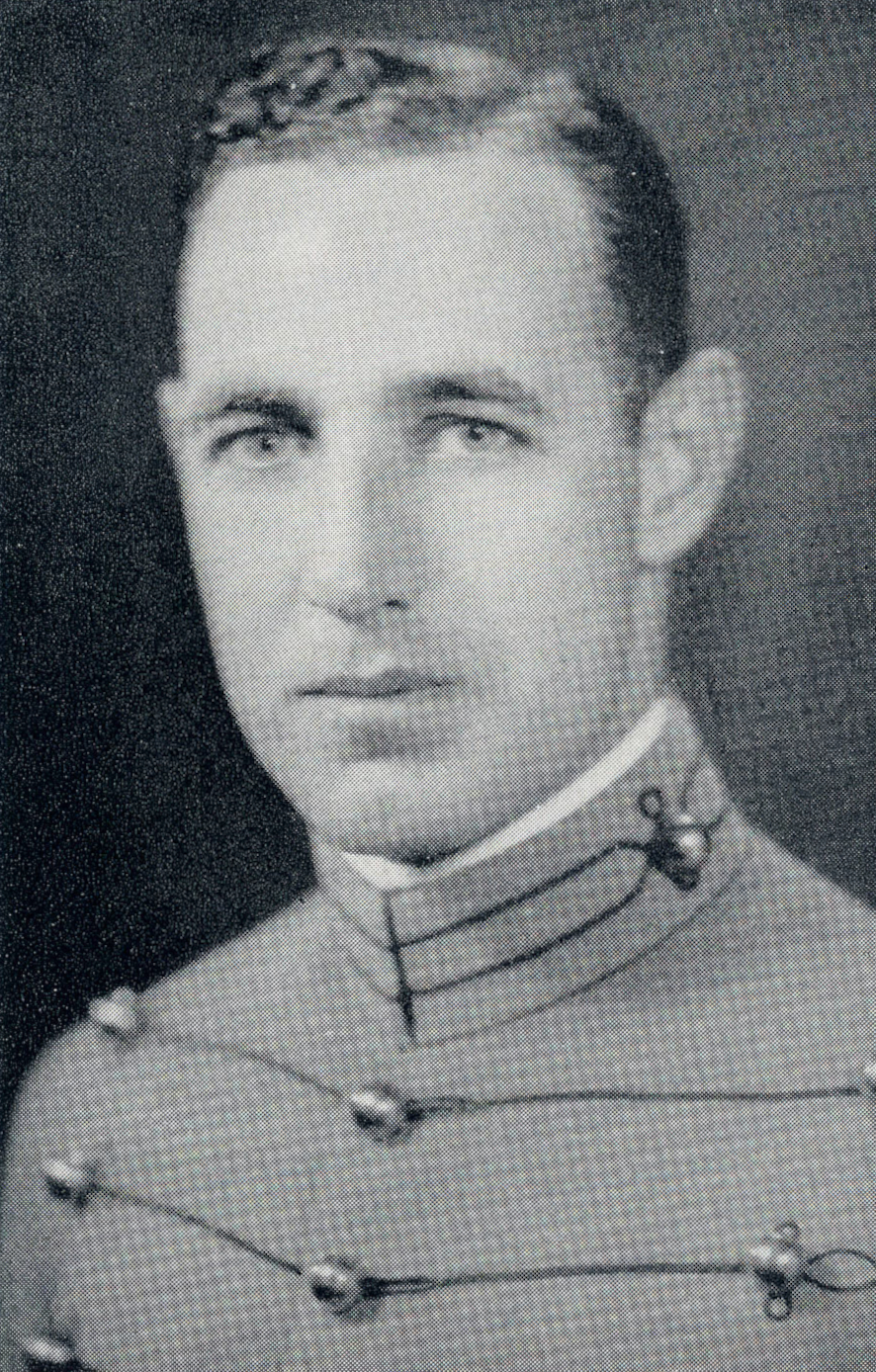
Gibb as a United States Military Academy cadet c. 1933

Frederick William Gibb was born on July 24, 1908, in New York City as a son of Frederick Innes Gibb and his wife Jessie Anna (néé Leake). Gibb subsequently attended the United States Military Academy at West Point, New York, and graduated in July 1933. He was then commissioned a second lieutenant of infantry at that time and assigned to the 20th Infantry Regiment, 2nd Infantry Division at Fort Francis E. Warren, Wyoming. He was promoted to the rank of first lieutenant in June 1936.

He served with various infantry units until the summer of 1937, when he was ordered to the Army Infantry School at Fort Benning, Georgia for further training. Gibb completed the school in summer 1938 and was ordered to San Juan, Puerto Rico, for service with 65th Infantry Regiment, where he was promoted to the rank of captain.

== World War II ==
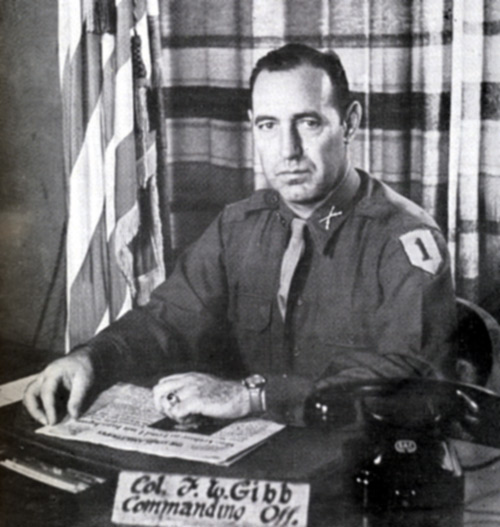
Gibb while in command of the 16th Infantry Regiment, sometime in either 1944 or 1945.

At the time of Japanese attack on Pearl Harbor in December 1941, which brought the United States into World War II, Gibb served as commander of E Company of the 16th Infantry Regiment, then commanded by Colonel Henry B. Cheadle, at Fort Devens, Massachusetts. Upon his promotion to major, Gibb served as Regimental Personnel officer and later as operations officer. His regiment was one of three which formed part of the 1st Infantry Division under Major General "Terrible Terry" Allen and sailed to England in August 1942 in order to prepare for Operation Torch, an Anglo–American invasion of French North Africa.

Gibb was appointed commanding officer of the 3rd Battalion, 16th Infantry while in England and later led his battalion during the amphibious landing at Arzew during the night of November 8, 1942 (see Operation Torch). He later led his unit during the assault on Oran and took part in the battles of Kasserine Pass and El Guettar. Gibb distinguished himself and received two Bronze Star Medals.

The 1st Infantry Division later took part in the Allied invasion of Sicily in July 1943 and Gibb participated in the heavy fighting against Germans. The 16th Infantry Regiment, together with the rest of the 1st Division, now commanded by Major General Clarence R. Huebner, sailed to Liverpool, England in October 1943 and Gibb was appointed lieutenant colonel and 1st Division Assistant Chief of Staff, G-3 (Operations and Plans). He was also decorated with Legion of Merit for his service in Africa and Sicily.

Gibb landed in Normandy at the beginning of June 1944 and received his second Legion of Merit for his part in the Battle of Normandy. He was relieved by Lieutenant Colonel Clarence E. Beck and subsequently succeeded Colonel George A. Taylor, who was promoted to assistant division commander (ADC) of the 1st Division, as commanding officer of the 16th Infantry Regiment and led his regiment during the battles of Hürtgen Forest, the Bulge and Remagen. He received the Silver Star for his service with the 16th Infantry Regiment in France, Belgium and Germany and also was decorated by the Governments of France and Belgium.

He ended the war in Franzensbad, Czechoslovakia, in May 1945 and received his third Bronze Star Medal, Czechoslovak Order of the White Lion, 3rd Class and Czechoslovak War Cross for his service during the final phase of World War II.

== Later career ==
Gibb returned to the United States in October 1945 and attended the Army Command and General Staff College at Fort Leavenworth, Kansas. He completed the course in February 1946 and was ordered to Fort Benning, Georgia for duty as chairman of Attack committee of the Tactical Department, Army Infantry School. Gibb remained in this capacity until summer 1948, when he was ordered to Washington, D.C., for instruction at the National War College.

Upon the graduation one year later, Gibb was promoted to the rank of colonel and served as staff member of Advanced Study Group of Plans and Operations Division, Army General Staff. He remained in this capacity until July 1950, when assumed duty as a member of the Joint Strategic Plans Group of the Joint Staff.

Gibb was ordered to Europe in September 1952 and appointed deputy chief of staff for plans and operations, Headquarters Allied Land Forces, Southeastern Europe at İzmir, Turkey. He returned to the United States in July 1954 and served at the Department of the Army in consecutive assignments as chief, Army War Plans Branch; assistant chief, Organization and Training Division; and director of Organization and Training, Office of the deputy chief of staff for Military Operations.

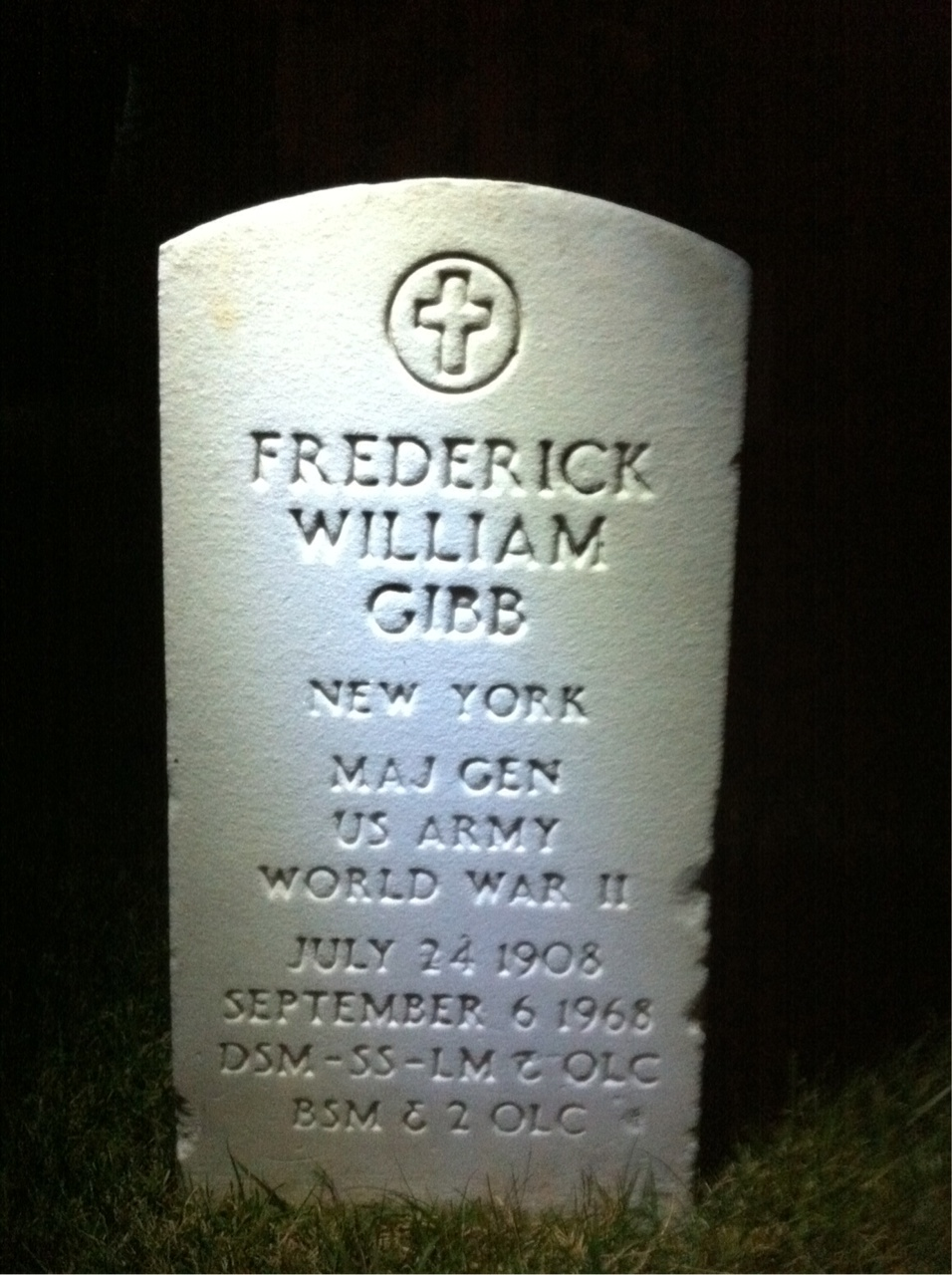
The grave of Major General Frederick W. Gibb at Arlington National Cemetery.

Following the promotion to the rank of brigadier general on March 16, 1956, Gibb was appointed commanding general, Army Combat Development Experimentation Center at Fort Ord, California. He was promoted to the rank of major general on August 1, 1959, and transferred to the command of the 2nd Infantry Division at Fort Lewis near Tacoma, Washington, in March 1960.

Gibb retired from active service due to physical disability in June 1961 and received the Army Distinguished Service Medal during his retirement ceremony, the citation for which reads:

The President of the United States of America, authorized by Act of Congress July 9, 1918, takes pleasure in presenting the Army Distinguished Service Medal to Major General Frederick William Gibb (ASN: 0-19222), United States Army, for exceptionally meritorious and distinguished services to the Government of the United States, in duties of great responsibility from July 1950 to June 1961.

Major General Frederick W. Gibb died at the age of 60 on September 6, 1968, in the army hospital at Andrews Air Force Base. He was buried at Arlington National Cemetery, Virginia, with his wife Delana Elizabeth (1910–1959). They had together one son Frederick W. Gibb II, a daughter Jean Gibb Phillips, wife of Major Fred B. Phillips USMA 1955.

== Decorations ==
Here is the ribbon bar of Major General Frederick W. Gibb:

Combat Infantryman Badge
1st Row	Army Distinguished Service Medal	Silver Star	Legion of Merit with Oak Leaf Cluster	Bronze Star with two Oak Leaf Clusters and "V" Device
2nd Row	American Defense Service Medal with Foreign Service Clasp	American Campaign Medal	European-African-Middle Eastern Campaign Medal with Arrowhead device and one silver and three bronze service stars	World War II Victory Medal
3rd Row	Army of Occupation Medal	National Defense Service Medal with Oak Leaf Cluster	Officer of the Legion of Honour (France)	French Croix de guerre 1939-1945 with Palm
4th Row	Chevalier of the Order of Leopold (Belgium)	Belgian Croix de guerre 1940-1945 with Palm	Czechoslovak Order of the White Lion, 3rd Class	Czechoslovak War Cross 1939-1945
Presidential Unit Citation with two Oak Leaf Clusters

Military offices
Preceded by William L. Hardick	Commanding General of the 2nd Infantry Division; 1960−1961	Succeeded by William L. Hardick
