= 16th Infantry Regiment (United States) =

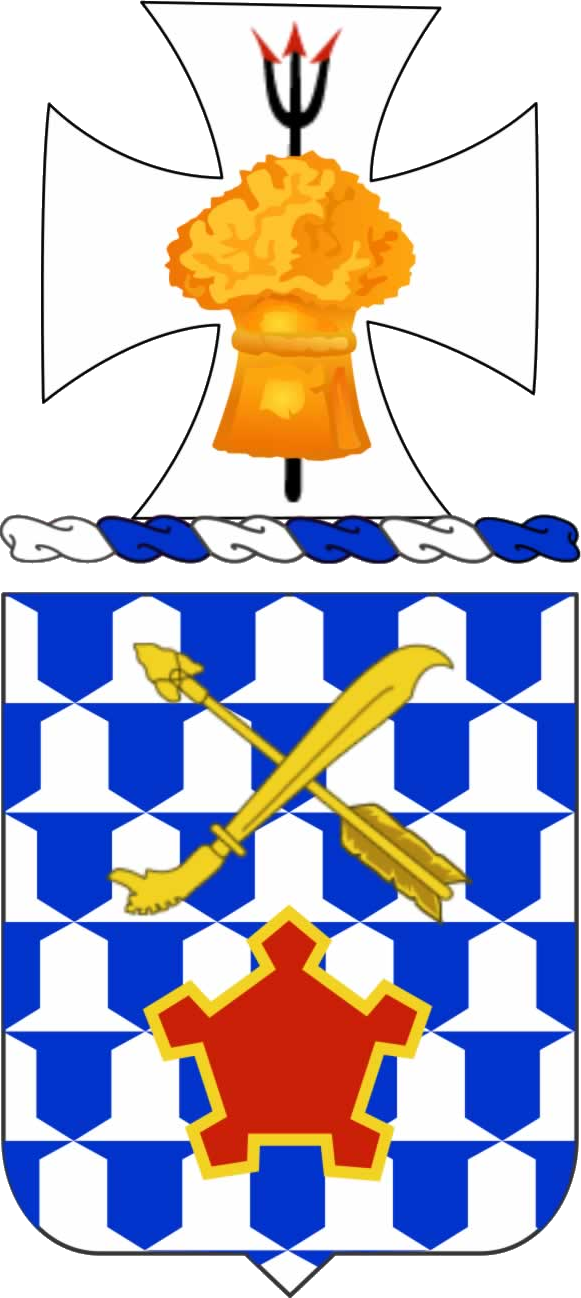
- Coat of arms
- Founded: 1861; 165 years ago
- Country: United States
- Branch: United States Army
- Type: Infantry
- Size: 1 battalion (Note: 2nd Battalion inactivated 1 May 2015)
- Garrison/HQ: Fort Riley, Kansas
- Nickname: "New York's Own" 1924–1941; "Rangers" 1948–present
- Motto: "Semper Paratus" (special designation)
- March: "Sidewalks of New York"
- Anniversaries: 4 October (Note: On 4 October 1918, 16th Infantry was the only regiment in the entire First Army to take its regimental objectives in the U. S. Army's opening attacks of the Meuse-Argonne campaign. The day is still celebrated as the regiment's Organization Day.)
- Engagements: American Civil War; Indian Wars; Spanish–American War; Philippine–American War; Pancho Villa Expedition; World War I; World War II; Algeria-French Morocco; Tunisia Campaign; Operation Husky; Operation Overlord; Northern France; Rhineland; Ardennes-Alsace; Western Allied invasion of Germany; Vietnam War; Persian Gulf War; Iraq War; War in Afghanistan
- Decorations: Presidential Unit Citation (5); Valorous Unit Award; Army Superior Unit Award; French Croix de Guerre (4); French Médaille militaire

Commanders
- Notable commanders: George A. Taylor; Frederick W. Gibb; Bruce Palmer Jr.

Insignia
- Distinctive unit insignia

The 16th Infantry Regiment ("Semper Paratus") is a regiment in the United States Army and has traditionally been a part of the 1st Infantry Division.

== History ==
=== Formation and earlier units designated "16th Infantry" ===
Five U.S. Army units have held the designation "16th Infantry Regiment." The first was constituted on 16 July 1798 and discharged 15 June 1800. The second was constituted on 11 January 1812, consolidated from May to October 1815 with the 6th, 22nd, 23rd, and 32nd Infantry Regiments to form the 2nd Infantry Regiment. The third 16th Infantry was constituted on 11 February 1847 for the Mexican-American War and disbanded on 10 August 1848. The fourth 16th Infantry Regiment was constituted on 3 May 1861 and consolidated on 18 April 1869 with the 2nd Infantry Regiment, the unit retaining the designation of 2nd Infantry.

The fifth and present 16th Infantry was originally constituted as the 1st Battalion, 11th U.S. Infantry by direction of the president on 4 May 1861, and confirmed by the act of 29 July 1861. Colonel Erasmus D. Keyes assumed command, and the regiment was organized by Major DeLancey Floyd-Jones. The regiment was organized into three battalions of eight companies each. On 6 April 1869, the regiment was consolidated with the 34th Infantry Regiment (originally organized as the 3rd Battalion of the fourth iteration of the 16th Infantry Regiment under the order of the president of May 1861), and redesignated the 16th Infantry Regiment.

=== United States Civil War ===
The 1st Battalion, 11th U.S. Infantry (today's 16th Infantry Regiment) was initially organized at Fort Independence, Massachusetts, in the summer and fall of 1861. That October, the regiment was transferred to Perryville, Maryland, to prepare for Major General George B. McClellan's upcoming spring campaign on the Virginia Peninsula. Assigned to the Army of the Potomac's 2nd Division, V Army Corps in the spring of 1862, the regiment fully participated in most of the key battles of that campaign to include the Siege of Yorktown (1862), Gaines's Mill, and Malvern Hill. The regiment participated in the Second Battle of Bull Run in August. This clash was quickly followed in succession by the regiment's involvement at the Battle of Antietam, the Battle of Shepherdstown and the actions Leetown that fall. In December 1862, the regiment fought at the Battle of Fredericksburg and at the Battle of Chancellorsville in May 1863. A month later, the 1st Battalion, 11th U.S. Infantry fought what was arguably its most significant action of the war at Gettysburg under the leadership of Major Floyd-Jones. In heavy fighting in the Rose Wood and Plum Run Valley between the Devil's Den and the Wheatfield, the regiment lost about 50 percent of its strength as it fought to contain James Longstreet's breakthrough of the Union Third Army Corps at the Peach Orchard.

During the spring and summer of 1864, the regiment participated in General Ulysses S. Grant's Overland Campaign and fought at the battles of the Wilderness, Spotsylvania, Jericho Mills, Cold Harbor, and finally in the Siege of Petersburg. In November the regiment was sent to New York for a short period, then after short stints at Lafayette Barracks in Baltimore and Camp Parole (Parole Camp) at Annapolis in Maryland, it was returned to the Army of the Potomac to perform duties as part of the Army of the Potomac's Provost Guard in February 1865. By the spring of 1865, only a few of those soldiers sworn in at Fort Independence in 1861 were still present to participate in the regiment's last wartime task—to help disarm General Robert E. Lee's weary Confederates at Appomattox that April.

On 18 April 1869 Headquarters, Staff, Band and the remaining companies of the 16th Infantry Regiment were consolidated with the 2d Regiment of Infantry, and the consolidated unit designated as the 2nd Infantry Regiment. Colonel Samuel W. Crawford, 16th Infantry, took command of the consolidated 2d Infantry because of his seniority.

Reorganized 14 April 1869, under the act of 3 March 1869, the present 16th Infantry was formed by the consolidation of the Eleventh (11th) and Thirty-fourth (34th) Regiments of Infantry. The 34th Infantry was organized by direction of the president 4 May 1861 as the Third Battalion, 16th Infantry and designated Thirty-fourth Infantry on 21 September 1866 under the act of 28 July 1866.The honors and battle history earned by the 11th Infantry during the Civil War became the 16th Infantry's with the 1869 consolidation and are displaying on its colors.

Following the Civil War the 16th took part in the reconstruction of the south, including the occupation of the Confederate capital of Richmond, and then served on the frontier, in the Indian Wars.

=== Spanish–American War ===
The 16th participated in the capture of San Juan Hill as part of the First Brigade, First Division of the V Corps, in the brigade commanded by Brigadier General Hamilton S. Hawkins. On 31 May 1899 the 16th sailed from San Francisco for Manila aboard USAT Grant to fight in the Philippine–American War. It fought 27 engagements with the greater part of its activities concentrated against the rebels in the Cagayan Valley, defending the Manila & Dagupan Railroad in a series of counterinsurgency actions. The regiment was relieved in March 1902 and returned to Fort McPherson, Georgia. It returned to Fort McKinley in the Philippines to serves as part of the Philippine Division under the command of Brigadier General John J. Pershing. It returned to the United States in 1907, where the First Battalion was assigned to Fort Logan H. Roots in North Little Rock, Arkansas and the remainder of the regiment assigned to Fort Crook.

=== Pancho Villa Expedition ===
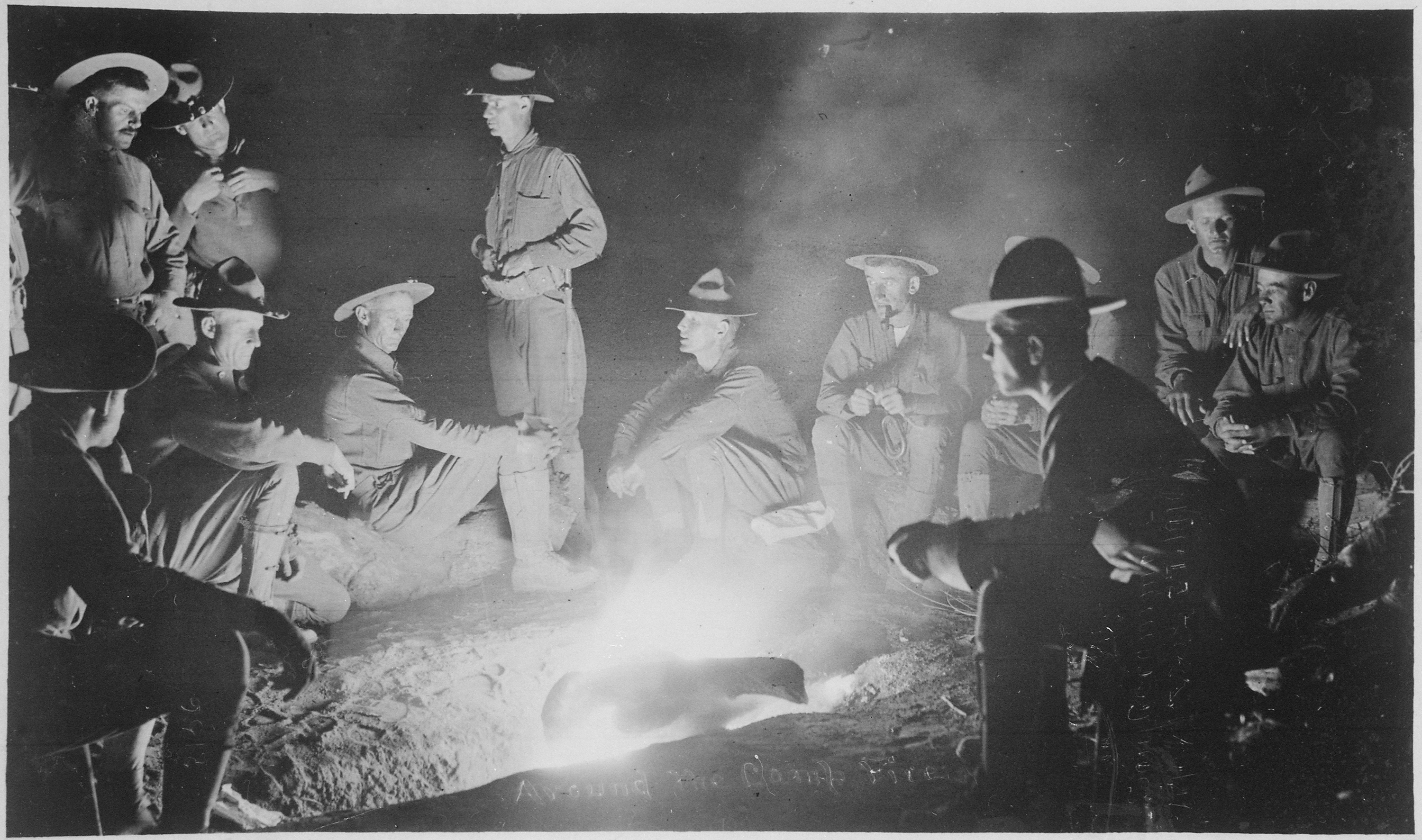
16th in San Geronimo

From July 1910 through July 1912, the 16th Infantry was assigned to a variety of posts in Alaska, then returned for duty at the Presidio of San Francisco aboard USAT Sheridan. Two years later, the regiment was transferred with the 8th Brigade, commanded by "Black Jack" Pershing, to the Mexican Border to help secure it from Mexican bandits and paramilitary forces commanded by Francisco "Pancho" Villa. On arrival in April 1914, the regiment was posted to Camp Cotton in the city of El Paso. For the next two years, in addition to the normal garrison duties, the troops conducted foot patrols along the dusty Mexican border. In March 1916, Villa raided Columbus, New Mexico, which, in turn, caused President Woodrow Wilson to order Pershing to take an expedition into Mexico to find Villa.

Assembling a largely cavalry force, Pershing selected two infantry regiments to accompany the Pancho Villa expedition, the 16th and 6th Infantry Regiments. The long march into the interior of Mexico was hot and dusty. After several weeks of movement between Colonia Dublán and El Valle, the 16th Infantry finally settled in the latter place in June. There the soldiers built mud brick huts for quarters and returned to a garrison routine, except for occasional patrols into the nearby mountains and valleys to hunt for rumored Villistas. Though the cavalry had several clashes with Villista and federal forces, the infantry had an uneventful eight months. In February 1917, Wilson recalled Pershing's expedition from Mexico.

=== World War I ===
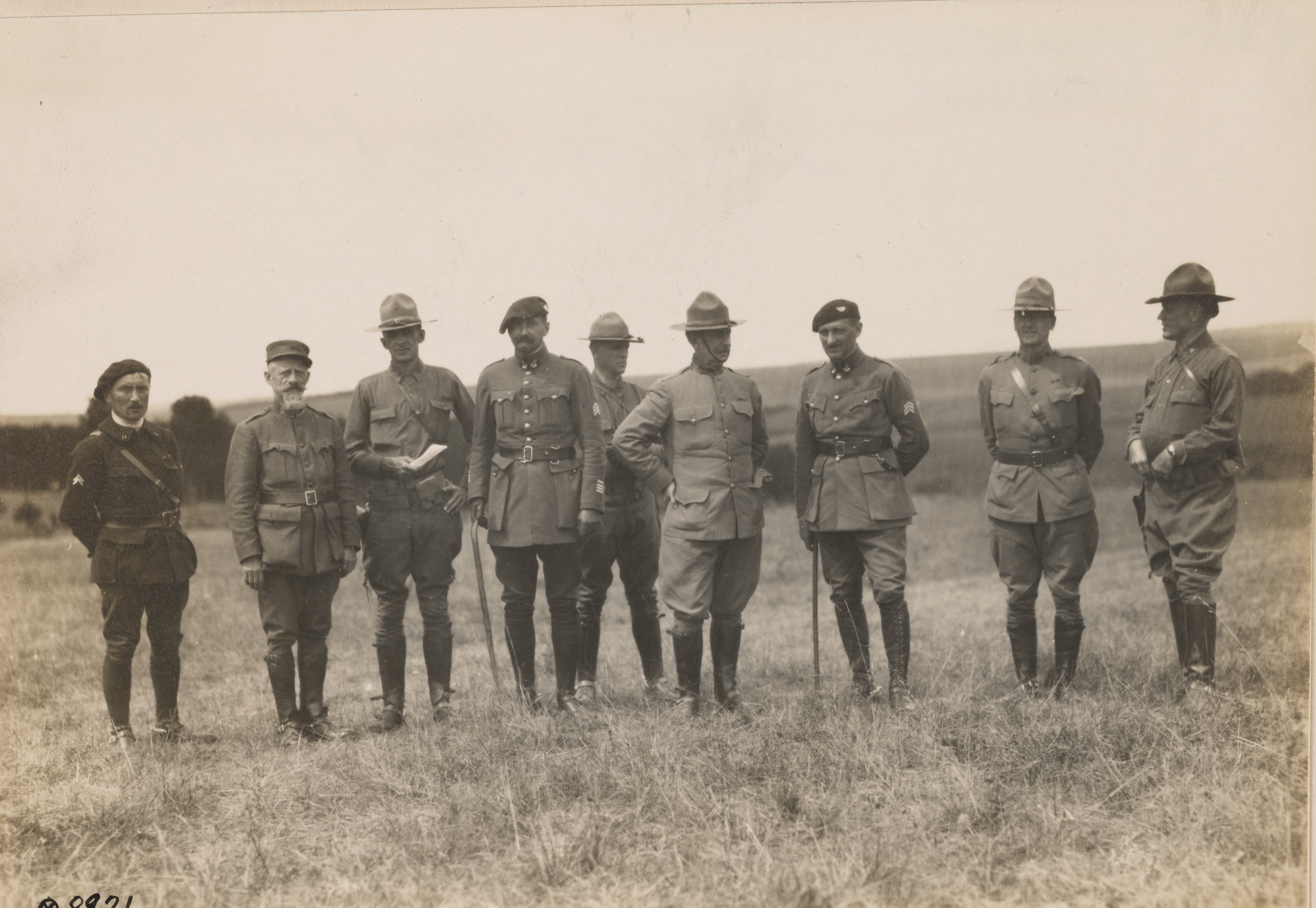
Officers of the 16th Infantry with French interpreters and instructor, Summer 1917.

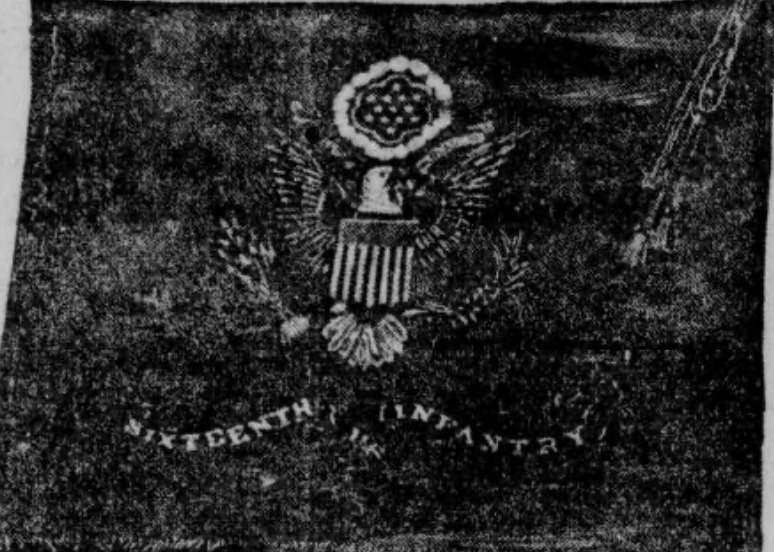
Regimental flag carried during World War 1

As part of the new 1st Expeditionary Division, soon to become known as the "Big Red One," the 16th Infantry, commanded by William Herbert Allaire Jr., sailed from Hoboken, New Jersey, and landed at St. Nazaire, France, near the end of June 1917. As such, it was among the first four American regiments to arrive on French soil in World War I. Soon after the regiment's arrival, the 2nd Battalion, 16th Infantry was selected to show the flag and parade through Paris on 4 July 1917. The battalion conducted a five-mile march through the streets of the city to Picpus Cemetery where General John J. Pershing and the other Americans in attendance paid homage at the tomb of the Marquis de Lafayette, hero of the American Revolution, and declare, "Lafayette, we are here!" Prior to being committed to battle, the 16th Infantry Regiment, began training in July 1917 in the Gondrecourt area with the French 47th Division, Chasseurs Alpins, nicknamed the "Blue Devils."

Throughout the summer and fall the training went apace and soon it was time for exposure to actual combat. On 3 November 1917, while occupying a section of trenches near Bathelémont, the 16th Infantry became the first U.S. regiment to fight and suffer casualties in the trenches during World War I when it repelled a German night raid. In the months that followed, the 16th Infantry would sustain even more casualties in defensive battles at Ansauville, Cantigny, and Coullemelle. The regiment's first major attack was made during the bloody three-day drive near Soissons in late July 1918. Along with the rest of the Big Red One, it relentlessly attacked until a key German rail line was severed forcing a major withdrawal of the enemy's forces.

The regiment also participated in the First U.S. Army's huge offensive to reduce the St. Mihiel salient in September. Arguably the regiment's most gallant action was the grueling drive that liberated the little village of Fléville in the Argonne Forest region on 4 October 1918. This feat was significant in that the 16th Infantry was the only regiment in the entire First Army to seize its main objective on the first day of the Meuse-Argonne Campaign. To this day that action is celebrated annually during the 16th Infantry Regiment's Organization Day. The 16th Infantry also participated in the 1st Division's final drive of the war when the division attacked to seize the city of Sedan. The verve and vigor of that drive demonstrated the regiment lived up to the division's new motto, "No mission too difficult, no sacrifice too great—Duty First!" During the Great War, the 16th Infantry suffered its greatest number of wartime casualties to date, all in a single year of combat. It sustained 1,037 soldiers killed in action or mortally wounded, and 3,389 wounded. In addition to the 7 campaign streamers earned by the regiment and the 2 Croix de Guerre granted by the French government, its soldiers were awarded at least 97 Distinguished Service Crosses. The 16th Infantry, along with the rest of the 1st Division, marched into the Coblenz Bridgehead in late 1918 to perform occupation duty there for the next 9 months. In August 1919, the division received orders to come home and boarded ships at Brest, France, later that month.

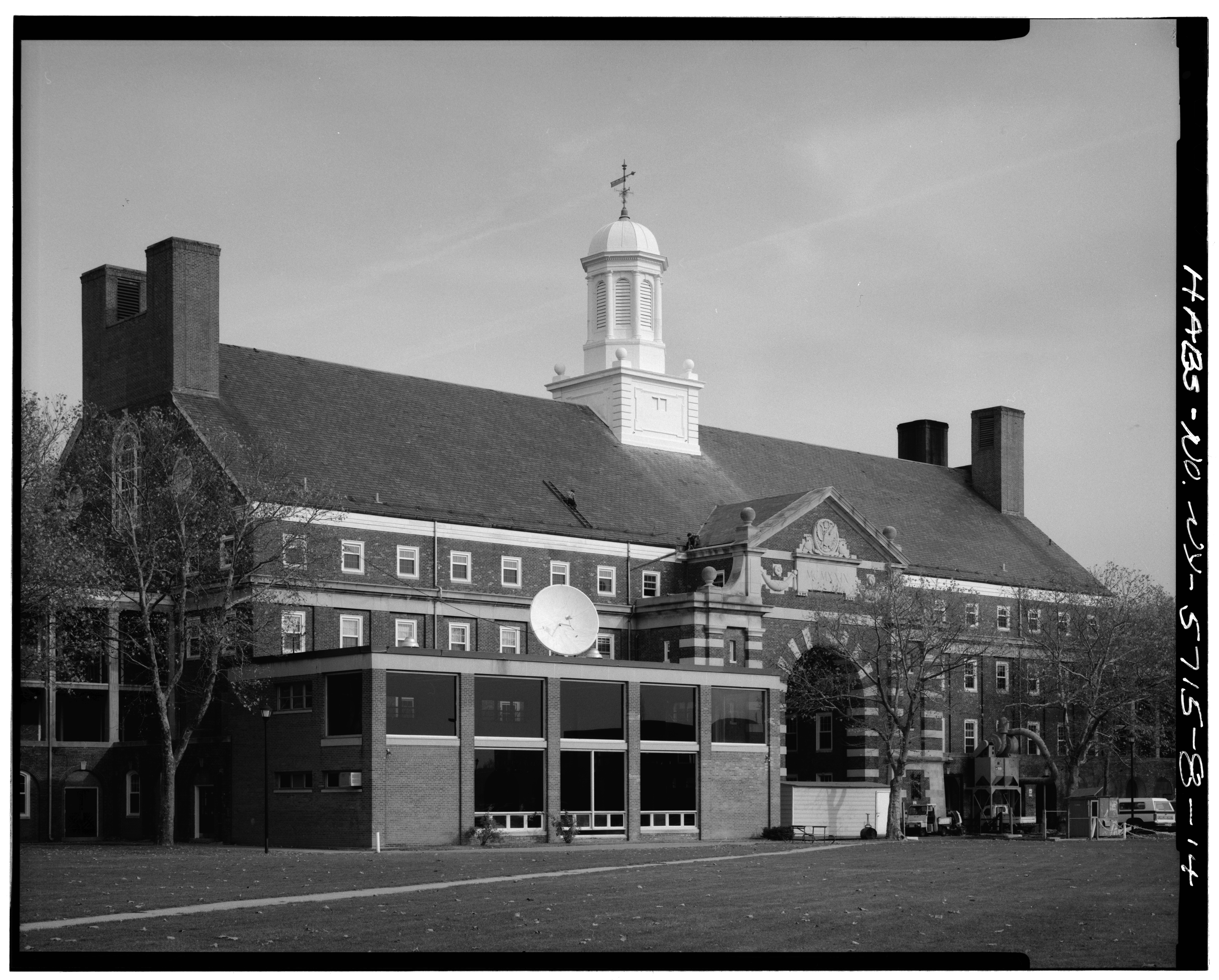
Regimental barracks for 16th at Governors Island

=== Interwar period ===
The 16th Infantry arrived at the port of New York on 3 September 1919 on the troopships Amphion, Freedom, Suwanee, and Marica, and was transferred to Camp Merritt, New Jersey, where emergency period personnel were discharged from the service. The regiment participated in the 1st Division Victory Parades in New York City and Washington, D.C., on 10 and 17 September 1919, respectively. It was transferred 4 October 1919 to Camp Zachary Taylor, Kentucky. After the passage of the National Defense Act of 1920 reorganized the Army, the 1st Division was allotted to the Second Corps Area and transferred on 16 September 1920 in a permanent change of station to Camp Dix, New Jersey. The 16th Infantry was transferred on 10 June 1922, less the 3rd Battalion, to Fort Jay, on Governor's Island in New York Harbor; the 3rd Battalion transferred in September 1922 to Fort Wadsworth, on Staten Island. The regiment was organized with elements of the 18th Infantry into the “Composite Regiment” and went to Washington, D.C., to act as an honor guard for the unveiling of the 1st Division War Memorial on 4 October 1924. The 3rd Battalion was transferred on 18 March 1933 to Fort Jay. Due to the regiment's popularity in New York City, mayor Fiorello H. La Guardia later nicknamed the unit "New York's Own" and ''The Sidewalks of New York" became the regimental song.

In April 1933, the regiment assumed command and control of portions of the 1st Civilian Conservation Corps District (New Jersey), Second Corps Area. Elements served as an honor guard and escort to President Manuel Quezon of the Philippines on 24 February 1937; to U.S. president Franklin D. Roosevelt in October 1937 during his visit to Poughkeepsie, New York; and to English King George VI and Queen Elizabeth I in June 1939 during their visit to New York City. The regiment departed the New York Port of Embarkation on 1 November 1939 on the USAT Republic and debarked at the port of Charleston, South Carolina, en route to Fort Benning, Georgia. The regiment arrived at Fort Benning on 9 November 1939, and conducted training in preparation for the 1940 Louisiana Maneuvers. After maneuvers in Louisiana in May 1940, the regiment returned to Fort Jay, and was transferred on 20 February 1941 to Fort Devens, Massachusetts.

=== World War II ===
Pearl Harbor, 7 December 1941, found the 16th Infantry back at Fort Devens, but not for long. Commanded by Henry B. Cheadle, the regiment departed for England in August 1942, where it joined a large contingent of US troops slated for participation in Operation Torch, the invasion of North Africa. In its first amphibious assault under combat conditions, the 16th Infantry landed on a beach near Arzew, French Morocco at 0100 hours, on 8 November 1942. Over the next three days, the regiment battled relatively light resistance from Vichy French forces and helped to capture Oran. In doing so, the 1st Infantry Division (whom the regiment was assigned to during World War II) established a permanent presence for the US Army in North Africa. During the remainder of the Tunisian campaign the 16th Infantry fought in a number of locations to include the Ousseltia Valley, Kasserine Pass, El Guettar, and Mateur. For its actions at Kasserine the regiment was decorated with the Croix de Guerre by the French Government and it received its first Presidential Unit Citation for its actions near Mateur.

Next came the Allied invasion of Sicily. Shortly before 0100 hours on 10 July 1943, the first wave of the 16th Infantry boarded landing craft for the assault on that island. After achieving a relatively bloodless hold on the beachhead in the darkness, the regiment pushed into the hills beyond. There the regiment was soon hit hard with an armored counterattack by German tanks. Despite numerous enemy tanks and reinforcements, the 16th Infantry desperately held on by receiving assistance from the heavy guns of the U.S. Navy and the timely arrival of the regiment's Cannon Company. By 14 July 1943, the regiment had moved through Pietraperzia, Enna, and Villarosa. Fighting against snipers and well-fortified positions, the regiment moved forward by a series of flanking movements and by 29 July had taken the high ground west of the Cerami River. In early August, the regiment reached the town of Troina in eastern Sicily. At Troina the regiment experienced some of the most bitter fighting it would see during the war. After a four-day brawl with the battle-hardened troops of the 15th Panzergrenadier Division (Wehrmacht), the men of the 16th Infantry finally captured the town and soon after the Sicily campaign ended.

Subsequently, the regiment sailed to Liverpool, England, and from there entrained on 16 October 1943 for Dorchester, to carry out seven months of grueling training in preparation for the Allied invasion of Europe. On 1 June 1944, the men of the 16th Infantry departed their D-Camps in southwestern England and embarked on amphibious assault ships at the port of Weymouth. Units of the 16th Infantry boarded USS Samuel Chase, USS Henrico, and HMS Empire Anvil, preparatory to their third—and most important—amphibious assault mission. Late on the afternoon of 5 June 1944, the troop-laden ships slipped out of Weymouth harbor and headed for the beaches of Normandy. The long-awaited assault on "Fortress Europe" began in the early hours of 6 June 1944 as the 16th Infantry Regiment moved toward Omaha Beach. At approx. 0530 hours A Company, 1st Battalion disembarked from the Chase, they landed on ER beach at H-70 (0740 hours). B Company landing was put into echelon on ER beach at 0735 amidst heavy artillery and MG fire. C Company Co. landed on Easy Red (ER) Section at H / 70 (0740). The landing was made midway between points where the 2nd and 3rd Battalions 16th Infantry had landed. D Company landed on Easy Red at 0620 hours. Company F landed on Beach vicinity of Colleville a Mer at 0640 hours. On the Henrico, G Company, 2nd Battalion assault craft teams were loaded by 0415 hrs. leaving for the beach by 0555 hrs. H Company reached the shore at approx. 0727 hours and I Company, 3rd Bn. landed between 0650 and 0700. As landing craft dropped their ramps, men were killed and wounded as they attempted to get out of the boats. Others were hit as they struggled through the surf or tried to run across the sand weighted down with water-logged equipment. Many were shot down, but others made it in close to the base of the bluff where they found the area mined and crisscrossed with concertina wire. Eventually, an assault section of E Company under First Lieutenant John M. Spalding and Staff Sergeant Philip Streczyk managed to cross a minefield, breach the enemy wire, and struggle their way to the bluff. Colonel George A. Taylor, the regimental commander, noting the small breakthrough stood to his feet and yelled at his troops, "The only men who remain on this beach are the dead and those who are about to die! Let's get moving!" Soon other troops began making their way up the bluffs along Spaulding's route while other gaps were blown through the wire and mines. By vicious fighting, some hand-to-hand, other sections, platoons, and eventually companies made it to the top and began pushing toward Colleville-sur-Mer. By noon of that bloody day, the 16th Infantry had broken through the beach defenses and established a foothold that allowed follow-on units to land and move through.

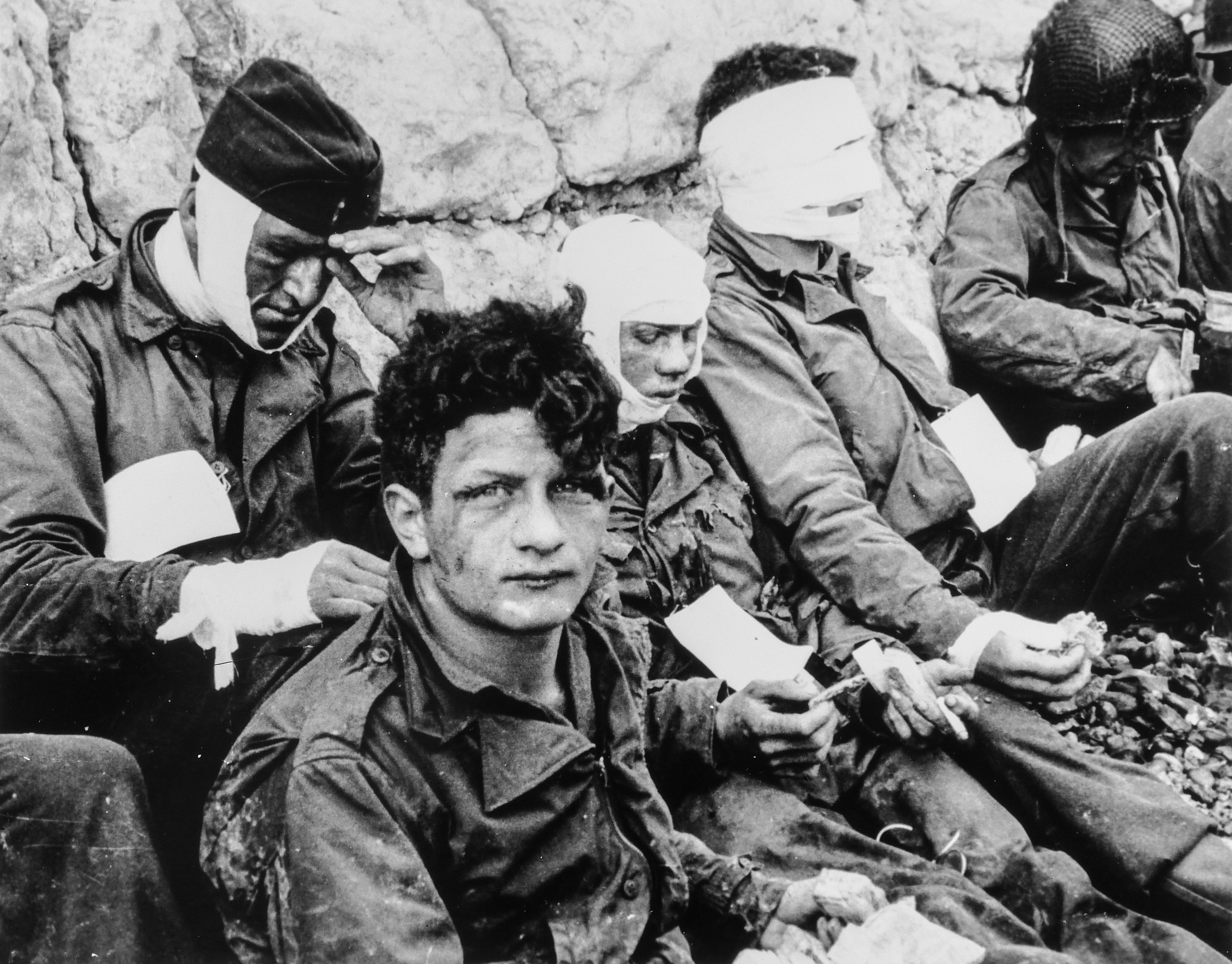
At Omaha Beach on D-Day, June 1944 According to the French historian, Georges Bernage, Omaha Beach 6 June 1944, this photo was from war correspondent Richard Taylor, and taken at about 0720. They GIs are awaiting evacuation under the cliffs at Fox Red Beach on the far left flank. They are members of the 3rd Battalion 16th RCT, 1st Infantry Division [likely GIs of Company L].

The evening of D-Day plus 1 found all of the units of the regiment ashore, many of them well inland by that time, but some were combat ineffective due to casualties. A few weeks later, at an awards ceremony on 2 July 1944, Generals Eisenhower, Bradley, and Gerow came to praise the troops of the regiment for their heroic efforts and to present the Distinguished Service Cross to a number of the regiment's officers and men. After D-Day, the 16th Infantry became the division reserve, and after a brief rest, continued moving inland. In late July, the regiment was still in division reserve when it was ordered to be prepared to assist in a breakout through the German line near Saint-Lô. After the saturation bombing of the Panzer Lehr Division on 25 July, the Big Red One closely followed the 9th Infantry Division in the breakout attempt.

Two days later the 16th Infantry was launched on an attack through a break in the lines near Marigny and drove on the city of Coutances where it established battle positions on 29 July. By this time, the Germans were in headlong retreat and attempting to establish a new line well to the east. Their efforts would fail and the German Seventh Army would be largely destroyed as it attempted to escape via the Falaise Gap. Meanwhile, in an effort to keep up with the retreating Germans, the men of the 16th Infantry piled on trucks, tanks, and anything else they could find to move eastward as quickly as possible. After motoring south past Paris, the regiment caught up with the enemy again near Mons, Belgium, where it helped the 1st Infantry Division destroyed six German divisions in August and early September. From Mons, the regiment pushed on with the Big Red One toward Aachen, Germany, just across the German frontier.

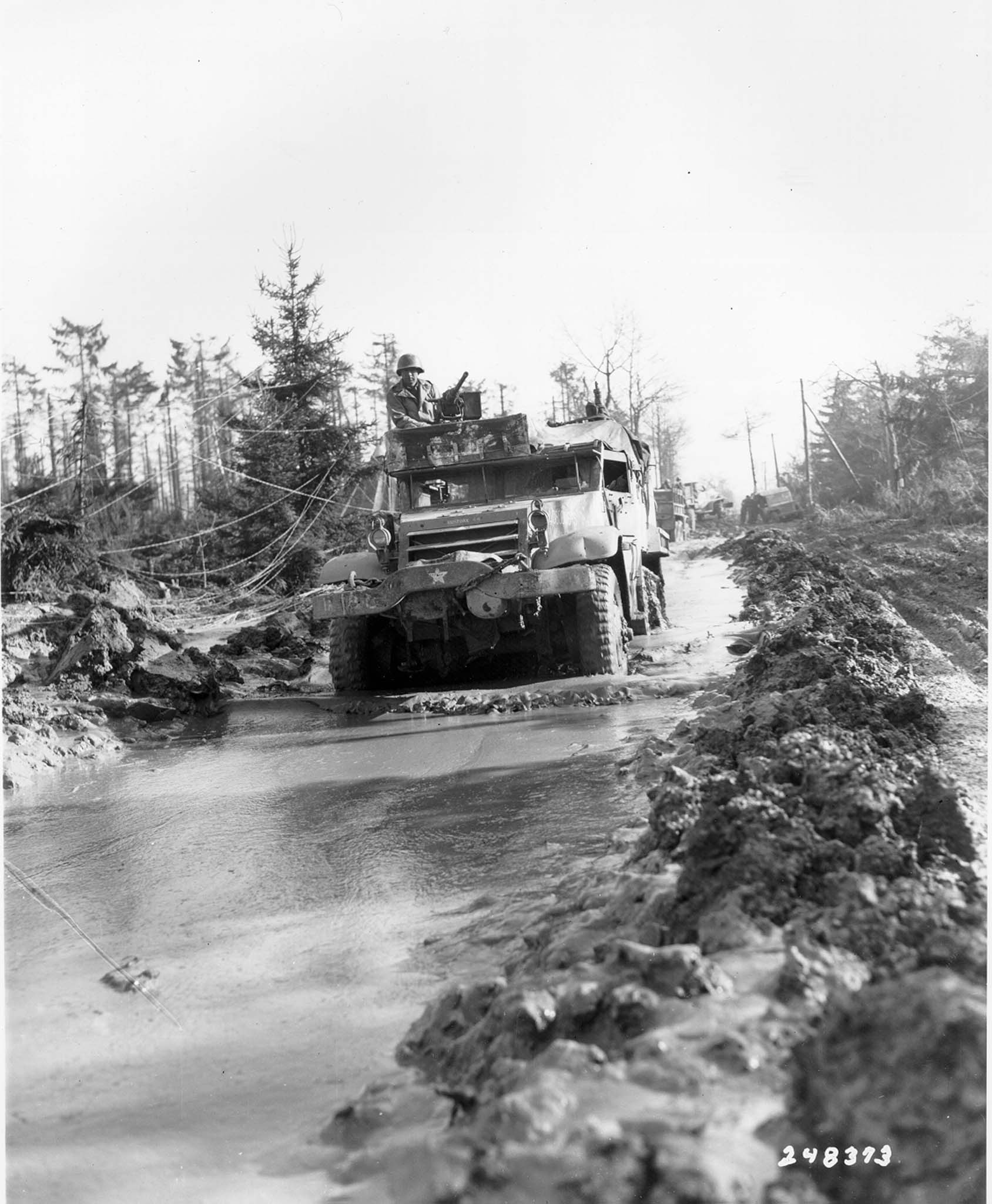
A 1st Infantry Division half-track plows its way through a muddy road in the Hürtgen Forest. 16th Infantry Regiment, 1st Infantry Division. 15 Feb 1945.

For the next three months, the men of the 16th Infantry would experience some of the most grueling fighting of the war in the infamous Hürtgen Forest near Aachen, Stolberg, and Hamich. After sustaining very heavy casualties from enemy artillery fire and the cold dreary weather, the entire division was sent to a rest camp on 12 December 1944. The stay was short, because Hitler launched Operation Wacht am Rhein four days later and the Battle of the Bulge was on. The division was sent to bolster the northern shoulder of the bulge near Camp Elsenborn. The regiment was ordered to positions near Weywertz. For the next month, the men of the 16th Infantry held defensive positions there, conducted heavy patrolling toward the German positions near Faymonville, and engaged in a number of firefights with troops of the 1st SS Panzer and 3rd Fallshirmjaeger divisions. All of this was conducted in heavy snows during one of the coldest European winters on record. On 15 January 1945, the Big Red One launched its part of the Allied counteroffensive to reduce the Bulge.

Over the next seven weeks, the regiment conducted numerous operations in western Germany culminating in the capture of Bonn 8 March 1945. From there the Big Red One moved north to the Harz Mountains to eliminate a German force cut off there by the rapid advance of the First and Ninth US Armies. For a week the regiment conducted several attacks against die-hard enemy troops. On 22 April, the Big Red One finished clearing the Harz and soon received orders to once again head south. This time, the division was reassigned to the Third Army for its drive into Czechoslovakia. On 28 April, the regiment arrived near Selb, at the Czechoslovak border, and began advancing east. For the next ten days the 16th Infantry pushed into that country arriving near Falkenau (now Sokolov) by 7 May. At 0800 that day, a net call went out to the entire regiment to cease all forward movement. The war was over.

In 443 days of combat, the 16th Infantry had sustained 1,250 officers and men killed in combat. An additional 6,278 were wounded or missing in action. Its men had earned four Medals of Honor, 87 Distinguished Service Crosses, and 1,926 Silver Stars. Additionally, the regiment, or its subordinate units, was awarded five presidential unit citations and two distinguished unit citations from the United States, two Croix de Guerre and the Médaille militaire from the government of France, and the Belgian Fourragerre and two citations from the government of Belgium.

=== Vietnam War ===
==== The 2nd Battalion in the Vietnam War ====
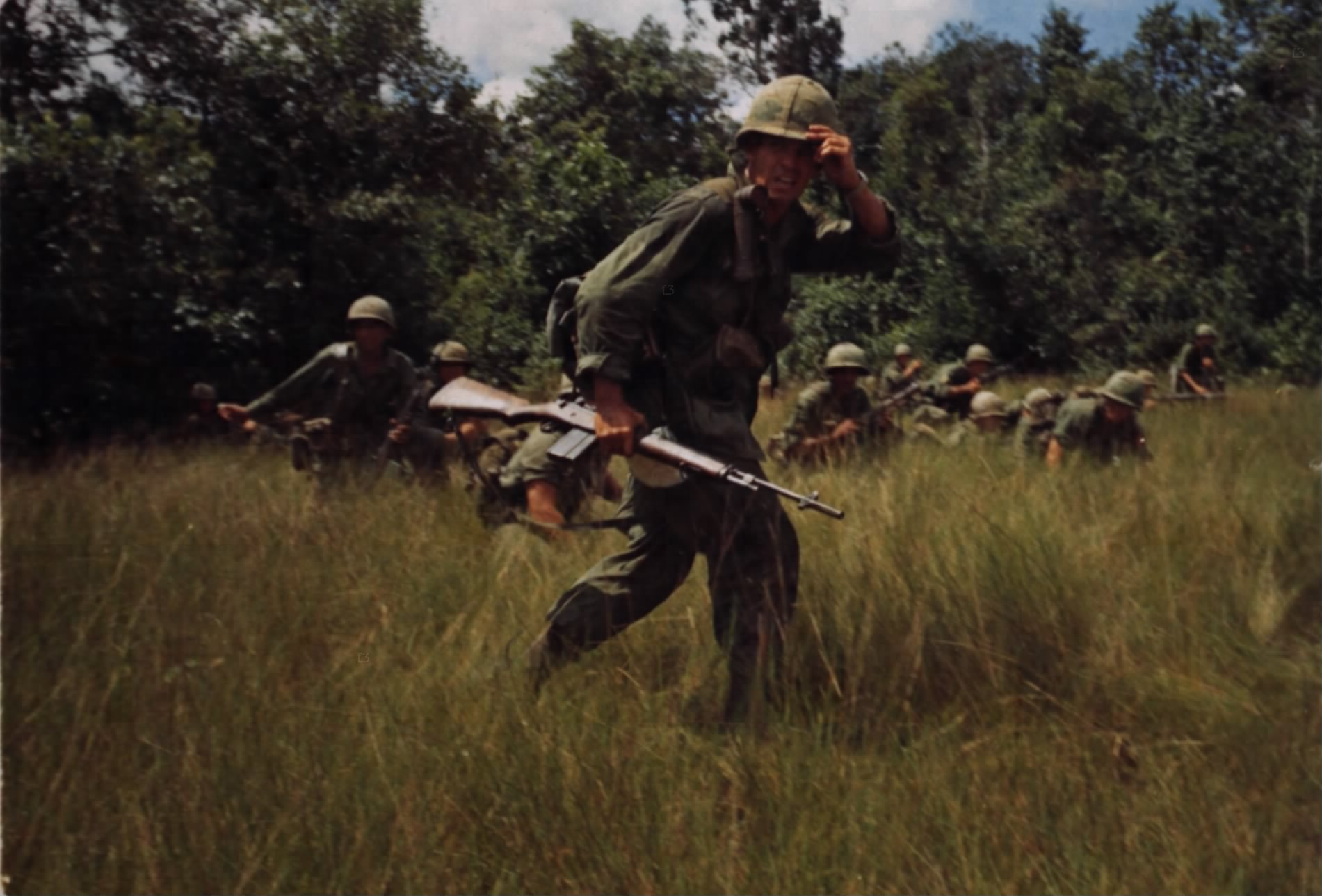
Men of Company "C", 16th Infantry draw sniper fire while on a search and destroy mission, 4 October 1965

In 1965, the 2nd Battalion, 16th Infantry Regiment and the 2nd Battalion, 18th Infantry Regiment became the first elements of the Division to deploy to South Vietnam. The battalion arrived on the USS General W. H. Gordon on 14 July 1965 as a part of the 2nd Brigade, 1st Infantry Division (United States) and debarked at Vung Tau. The troops were initially sent to Long Binh Post north of Saigon and there the battalion immediately began building a base camp named Camp Ranger. In the many ensuing operations, the elusive enemy had to be found before he could be destroyed and to find him the troops had to remain almost constantly in the field on search missions. "Search and Destroy" operations such as those conducted during Operations Mastiff, Bushmaster, Abilene, Birmingham, El Paso, Attleboro, Cedar Falls and Junction City usually found the battalion operating far from its base camp area throughout the III Corps Tactical Zone. The sites of these missions included many areas that were to become well known to many U.S. infantrymen during the Vietnam years: the impenetrable jungles of Tay Ninh near Cambodia; Ho Bo Woods; the "Iron Triangle"; the Michelin Rubber Plantation; the Trapezoid, and War Zones C and D. In all these places, the 2nd Rangers inflicted heavy losses on enemy manpower and supplies. In March, the 2nd Battalion moved to a new home at Camp Bearcat. Once settled into its new location, the battalion received a warning order for the next operation, Abilene. Abilene was a division-level effort to find and destroy several enemy formations operating due east of Saigon. The major incident during this huge mission took place near the village of Xã Cam My and the Courtenay Plantation. On the afternoon of Easter Sunday, 11 April 1966, C Company became engaged in one of the toughest battles of the war. Encountering the D800 Battalion set up in a well-fortified base camp, the 2nd Rangers fought fiercely, often hand to hand, for hours into the night. Although the company suffered heavy casualties, over 30 KIA, its soldiers held their own until a relief force arrived the following morning. The VC battalion, however, had paid heavy toll for its attempt to overrun C Company. With over 100 killed in action and its base camp destroyed, the remnants of the enemy unit were forced to flee to avoid complete destruction as the rest of the battalion continued the search. Throughout the rest of 1966, the 2/16th Infantry participated a series of pacification operations. The overall mission of these operations was to move into a semi-populated area and conduct extended operations to find and destroy enemy troops and support areas. These consisted of Operations El Paso I, II, and III, Allentown and Fairfax.

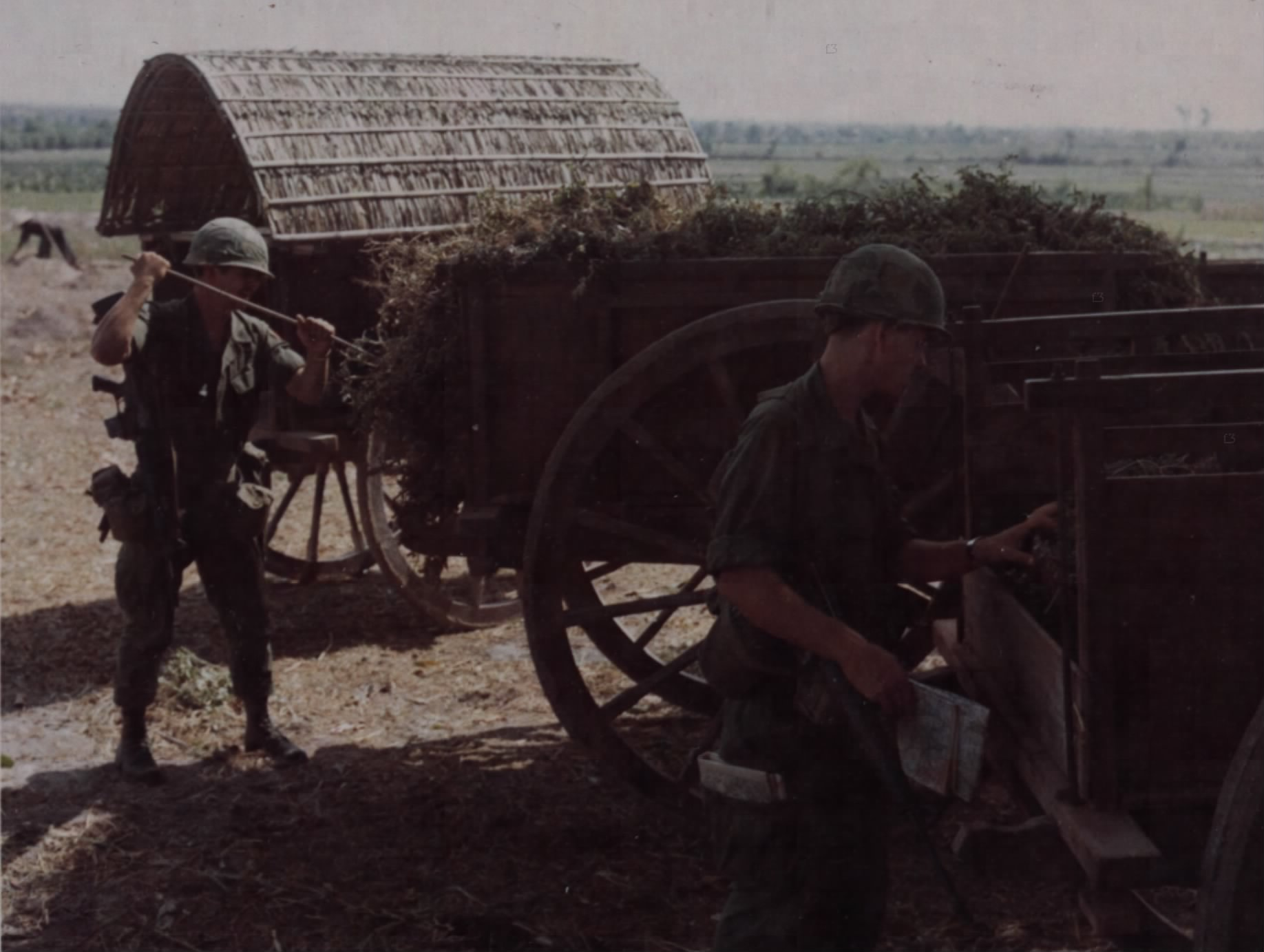
Men of Company "A", 2nd Battalion, 16th Infantry, check a wagon loaded with grain for hidden weapons and ammunition near Di An Base Camp, 6 April 1969

During the first part of 1967 the 2nd Rangers participated in Operation Lam Son in the Phu Loi area and Operation Junction City, the largest single mission of the war. During most of the rest of 1967, the battalion continued to conduct pacification efforts with Army of the Republic of Vietnam (ARVN) 5th Division partner units and conduct patrols, ambushes, and search and destroy missions near Ben Cat. The end of January 1968 saw the beginning of the Tet Offensive, the VC effort to overrun and win the war in South Vietnam. Both battalions of the regiment were intimately involved in the US Army's own counteroffensive operations during this period. Flush on the heels of what was a significant South Vietnamese-U.S. victory, the 2nd Rangers took part in Operations Quyet Thang and Toan Thang. These were pacification operations designed to consolidate gains made during Tet as well as start moving U.S. Army efforts more toward working with ARVN units to provide local security for key hamlets in villages in the hinterlands. In September while conducting pacification efforts near "Claymore Corners," the 2nd Battalion was suddenly redeployed by air to the vicinity of Loc Ninh to help hunt for the People's Army of Vietnam (PAVN) 7th Division's 141st Regiment. In a classic meeting engagement on 12 September, the battalion battled and pursued the 141st Regiment over the next two days inflicting hundreds of casualties and over fifty known KIA. After the operations around Loc Ninh, the battalion was assigned to the "Accelerated Pacification Campaign" in November and continued on this effort into the new year as part of the Lam Son mission in the Phu Loi area north of Di An.

Throughout 1969, the 2nd Rangers performed numerous and varied missions in support of the pacification campaign. In April it joined in Operation Plainsfield Warrior in the "Trapezoid" and in numerous search and destroy missions in June and July around Ben Cat and Lai Khê. Later in July the battalion was assigned the road security mission along a section of the highway to Sông Bé Province. Known as the "Thunder Run," the route was so-named due to the many mortars, rockets, and mines the enemy used to interdict US and ARVN traffic along the road. The battalion remained engaged in that mission until September 1969 when it was transferred permanently to Lai Khe where it joined the 1st Battalion under the 3rd Brigade, an assignment which remained constant for the remainder of the war.

==== The 1st Battalion in the Vietnam War ====
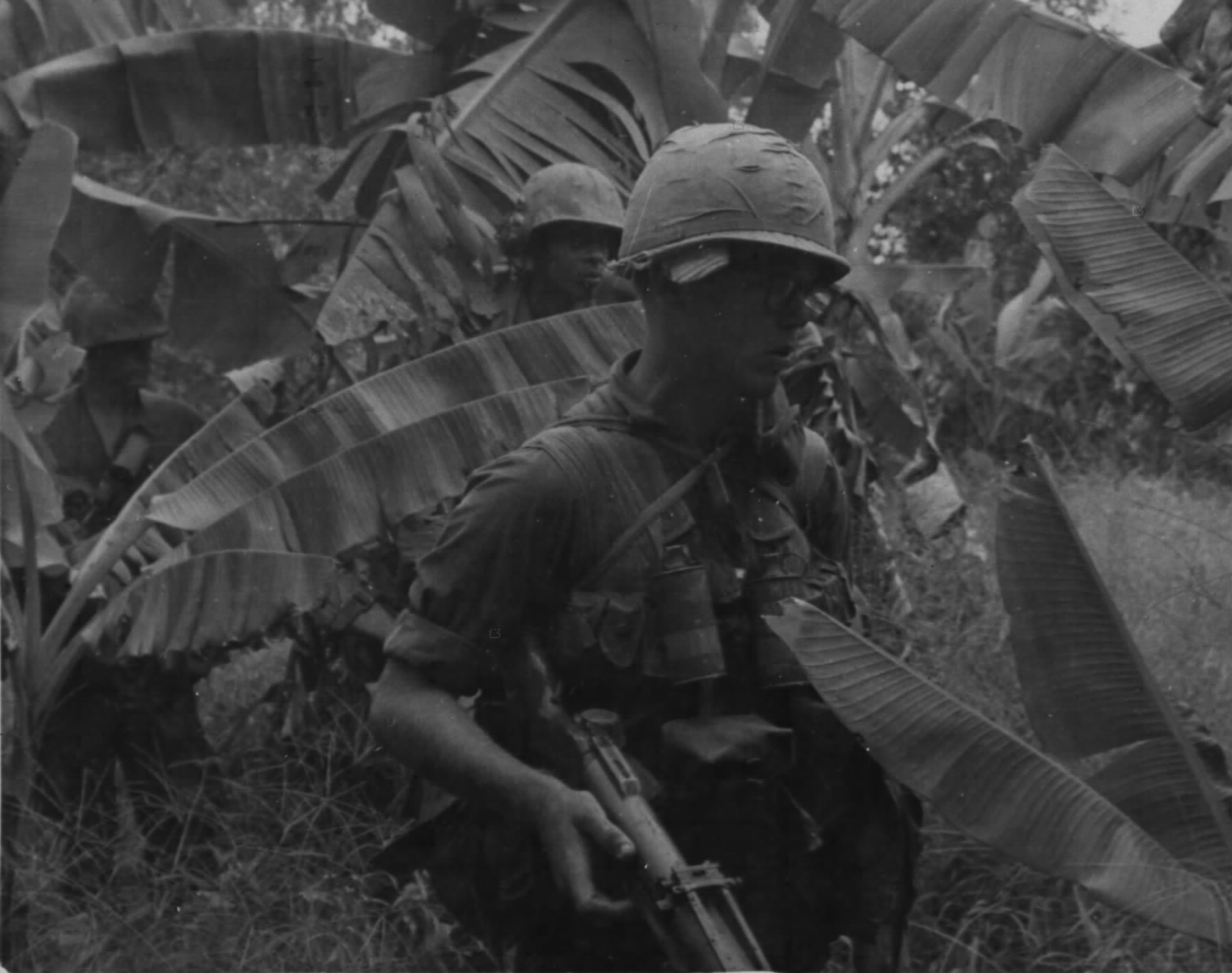
Men of Company "C", 1st Battalion, 16th Infantry on a sweep operation in Dinh Tuong Province, 14 October 1968

The 1st Battalion, 16th Infantry arrived at Vung Tau, Vietnam, on 10 October 1965 with the 3rd Brigade, 1st Infantry Division. The battalion was initially moved to Camp Ben Cat in Phuoc Vinh Province north of Saigon. The division wasted no time getting this newly arrived brigade into the fight in Operation Bushmaster I & II along Highway 13 between Lai Khê and Bến Cát District in Phouc Vinh Province and around the Michelin Rubber Plantation. The Bushmaster operations were followed by Mastiff in February 1966 and the division-level Operation Abilene to find and destroy the Viet Cong 5th Division. Abilene was followed in rapid succession by Operations Birmingham and El Paso I, II, and III. On 9 July during El Paso II, the 1st Rangers participated in the Battle of Minh Thanh Road. After the El Paso missions, the battalion next took part in Operation Amarillo in August near Lai Khê, and Operations Tulsa/Shenandoah in October and November. The latter mission was designed to bring the Viet Cong 9th Division to battle in War Zone C, but the enemy declined to take the bait. Operation Attleboro once again saw the regiment's two battalions operating on the same mission to find and destroy the 9th Division, this time northwest of Dầu Tiếng District. The last mission for the battalion for 1966 was Operation Healdsburg near Lai Khê in December. In January 1967, the 1st Battalion next joined in Operation Cedar Falls, a major effort conducted by the 1st and 25th Infantry Divisions, the 173rd Airborne Brigade and the 11th Armored Cavalry Regiment in Military Region 4, known as the "Iron Triangle" and the Thanh Dien Forest. Cedar Falls was followed by the enormous and extended Operation Junction City. The 1st Rangers participated in two major fights during Junction City: Prek Klok and Ap Gu. In the former battle, Platoon Sergeant Matthew Leonard from B Company was mortally wounded while demonstrating indomitable courage and superb leadership. For his actions he was awarded the regiment's tenth Medal of Honor. The battalion next experienced two additional significant firefights during Operation Billings north of Phuoc Vinh in June. These were the battles of Landing Zone (LZ) Rufe and LZ X-Ray. During the latter action, the Reconnaissance Platoon of the 1st Battalion withstood an attack by a battalion of the Viet Cong 271st Regiment and prevented the battalion perimeter from being overrun. Billings was followed by Operation Shenandoah II north of Lai Khê in October which once included both Ranger battalions and culminated the major operations of both for 1967. The year 1968 was an eventful one for the 1st Battalion. Starting in late January, the battalion, along with almost the entire combat force of U.S. Army, Vietnam (USARV), engaged in the Tet Counteroffensive designed to defeat the massive Tet Offensive of 1968. After Tet, the battalion successively partook in Operations Quyet Thang and Toan Thang. These operations held the battalion's attention most of the year until late 1968, when the 1st Rangers underwent a major change. On Friday, 13 September 1968, the "straight leg Infantry" 1st/16th of the 1st Infantry Division at Lai Khê, "swapped" colors and divisions, with the 5th/60th (Mechanized) of the 9th Infantry Division at Đồng Tâm Base Camp, in the Mekong River Delta. The 1st Battalion became a mechanized infantry unit which it has remained ever since. Because of this change, the battalion soon adopted the nickname "Iron Rangers." Throughout 1969, the Iron Rangers were involved the Vietnamization process which was designed to start turning over the planning and conduct of the war to the ARVN. Even so, the battalion joined in a number of combat operations such as Bear Trap, Friendship, Kentucky Cougar, Iron Danger and Toan Thang IV. During Kentucky Cougar in August, the Iron Rangers ran into a battalion of the 272nd Regiment near An Lộc in Bình Long Province and in an afternoon of hot fighting, accounted for 29 enemy KIA and an unknown number of wounded. During the year, the battalion accounted for an additional 426 enemy soldiers killed or captured even though the ARVN were supposed to take the lead for operations. The last months in Vietnam saw the battalion working closely with its ARVN counterparts as it concurrently prepared to end its mission and redeploy to Fort Riley.

The two battalions of the 16th Infantry fought in almost every campaign of the Vietnam War. During the almost five years of combat the regiment lost over 560 men, the regiment's soldiers were awarded 2 Medals of Honor (both posthumous), 10 Distinguished Service Crosses, and hundreds of Silver and Bronze Star Medals. The regiment was awarded 11 campaign streamers, as well as 2 Republic of Vietnam Cross of Gallantry (with Palm) Streamers for 1965-1968 and 1969 and the Republic of Vietnam Civil Action Honor Medal (First Class) Streamer for 1965–1970. In addition, C Company, 2nd Battalion was awarded the Valorous Unit Award Streamer for its actions at the battle of Courtenay Plantation.

=== Interim (1970 to 1990) ===
In April 1970, the 1st/16th was withdrawn from Vietnam along with the rest of the 1st Infantry Division and the bulk of the division was relocated to Fort Riley, Kansas. The division's 3rd Brigade, which included the 1st/16th, was moved to Germany to replace the forward deployed brigade of the recently deactivated 24th Infantry Division. For the next 20 years the 16th Infantry was prepared for a potential Soviet invasion of Western Europe.

=== Persian Gulf War ===
On 2 August 1990, Iraq invaded the sovereign country of Kuwait. This act precipitated U.S. military involvement in the Persian Gulf. As part of the general mobilization for this conflict that fall, the 2nd and 5th Battalions, 16th Infantry were alerted for deployment on 8 November 1990. The battalions deployed to Saudi Arabia soon after with the rest of the 1st Infantry Division (Mechanized) as part of Operation DESERT SHIELD. Operation DESERT STORM commenced on 17 January 1991 with air raids and artillery barrages on Iraqi targets, while the two battalions continued to rehearse their impending missions to penetrate Iraqi defenses and destroy the Republican Guard in zone. Concurrently, the 4th Battalion, 16th Infantry, 1st Infantry Division (Forward), which had deployed from Germany to the port of Dammam, Saudi Arabia, conducted the unloading and staging of coalition combat vehicles, equipment, and supplies for the ground war, and were the target of numerous SCUD missile attacks. On the morning of 24 February 1991, the Big Red One spearheaded the armored attack into Iraq, by creating a massive breach in the enemy defenses just inside Iraq. The breach was designed to allow other VII US Corps units to pass through the initial Iraqi Army forces and drive deep into Iraq. In the initial assault the 1st Infantry Division broke through the Iraqi 26th Infantry Division, destroyed it, and took over 2,500 prisoners. In the initial stages of the operation, that is just before, during, and after the breach made in the 2nd Brigade's sector, the major problem faced by the Rangers of the 2nd Battalion, 16th Infantry was not so much enemy fire (though that was a hindrance) as was the large number of Iraqi soldiers surrendering to the troops of the battalion. By darkness of the 24th, the Rangers had not only conducted a major breach into the Iraqi defensive zone, they had also penetrated 30 kilometers to Phase Line Colorado and captured some 600 enemy troops. The following morning, the 2nd Battalion pushed on with the 2nd Brigade and quickly battled through the Iraqi 48th Infantry Division capturing its commander and destroying its command post. By the end of that day, the brigade had cut through and destroyed the Iraqi 25th Division as well and had reached Phase Line Utah where it took up a temporary defensive position. After its breaching operations, the Big Red One's 1st Brigade, consisting in part of the 5th Battalion, 16th Infantry (known as Devil Rangers) and the 2nd Battalion 34th Armor, turned east and drove deep into enemy territory toward Phase Line Utah. En route on the 25th, the Devil Rangers also encountered a number of enemy formations, most notably the 110th Infantry Brigade. In a brief skirmish, that brigade's commander was scooped up by soldiers of the battalion. Like its brother battalion, the 5th Battalion was rounding up hundreds of enemy prisoners who had no fight left in them by this time. Ahead however, was the much vaunted Republican Guard known to be positioned at a place on the map called Objective NORFOLK. On the night of 26 February 1991, the 1st Brigade next collided with the Republican Guard's Tawalakana Division and the 37th Brigade, 12th Armored Division. The fight developed into a division-level battle and before dawn the Big Red One had destroyed both enemy formations. Enemy losses included more than 40 tanks and 40 infantry fighting vehicles. The 1st Infantry Division continued to exploit its success on the 27th by capturing and pursuing the demoralized Iraqi forces for the rest of the day. Following the Battle of Objective NORFOLK, the 5th Battalion raced ahead to assist in cutting the Iraqi lines of retreat from Kuwait City. As it approached the highway moving north out of Kuwait City and into southern Iraq, the Big Red One destroyed scores of enemy vehicles and took thousands more prisoners as the division's units advanced. About 2000, 27 February, the division's 1st Squadron, 4th Cavalry, seized the main highway leading north out of Kuwait and barred the Iraqis' escape. By the next morning, the rest of the division had taken up positions along the highway completely blocking any further movement north by the Iraqi Army. The cease fire was announced at 0800 on 28 February and the war was essentially over. While the Rangers of the 2nd Battalion were ordered to move over the ground just taken and destroy any remaining Iraqi vehicles and equipment that could be located in the rear, the 5th Battalion was ordered to the vicinity of Safwan Airfield in Iraq. There, the Devil Rangers were tasked with securing the site where on 3 March 1991 the negotiations were held between coalition forces and Iraqi leaders to finalize the cease-fire agreements. In this conflict the regiment earned 4 campaign streamers and each of the 2nd and 5th Battalions earned a Valorous Unit Award Streamer embroidered IRAQ-KUWAIT. On 10 May 1991, the division unfurled its colors at Fort Riley, Kansas, signifying its return home.

=== Bosnia and Herzegovina ===
1st Battalion deployed to Bosnia in March 1997 through March 2000 along with supporting elements from Fort Riley for peacekeeping operations. They were assigned under the 10th Mountain Division as part of SFOR 6. They were assigned primarily to Camp Dobol but also had elements assigned to Camp McGovern, Camp Demi and Camp Comanche.

=== Global War on Terrorism ===
==== Iraq War ====
Within a few months after the initial invasion of Iraq, the 1st Battalion, 16th Infantry made its first deployment in the Global War on Terrorism. In August 2003, the Iron Rangers, deployed with the 1st Brigade to Ramadi, Anbar Province, in western Iraq. The brigade was initially attached to the 82nd Airborne Division and took over Area of Operations (AO) Topeka on 26 September. Alpha (ATTK) Company 1-16's 1st and 2nd Platoons were attached to the 82nd Airborne's 1st of the 504th PIR in Fallujah until April 2004. Over the next year the Iron Rangers had numerous skirmishes with Sunni insurgents in and around the provincial capital city of Ramadi. Most notably, during 6–10 April 2004 when operating with elements of the 1st Marine Expeditionary Unit, the battalion fought a protracted battle with insurgents in the city. In addition to combat operations, during this tour the Iron Rangers trained elements of the new Iraqi Army as well as assisted with the implementation of numerous civil support projects. The battalion returned to Fort Riley in September 2004.

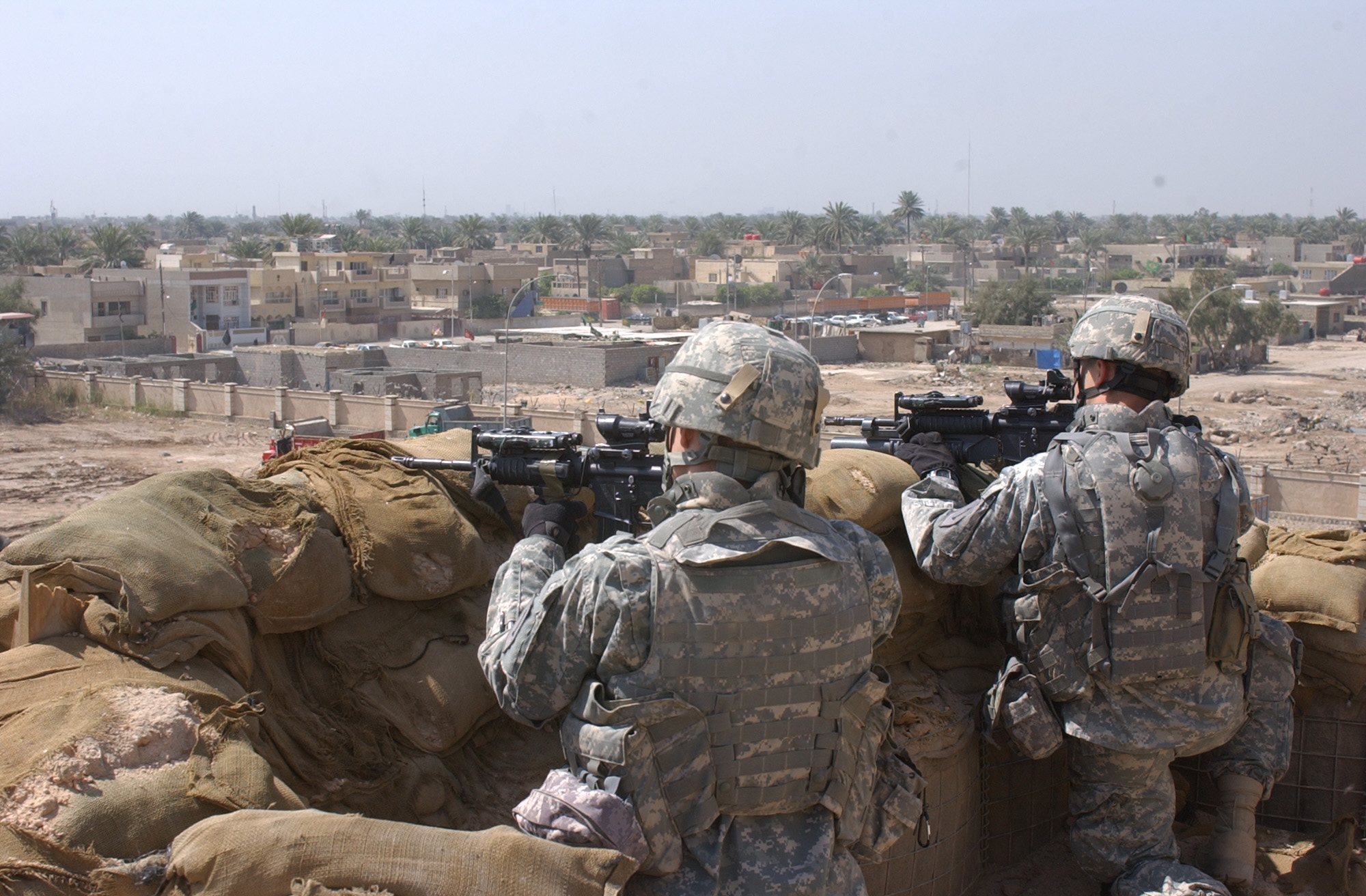
16th Infantry Regiment soldiers in Baghdad in March 2007

In 2006, as part of the 1st Brigade, the 1st Battalion was given a new mission to train Military Transition Teams ("MiTTs") which would deploy to Iraq to advise and assist the units of the fledgling Iraqi Army. The battalion, however, was still required to maintain its ability to participate in overseas contingency operations. As a result, the battalion was reorganized into three deployable line companies (A, B, and C) and six MiTT training companies (D, I, K, L, M, and N). Between 2006 and 2008, the three deployable companies were sent on GWOT missions overseas: Company A was deployed to the Horn of Africa and B and C Companies each served in Iraq. Concurrently, the MiTT training companies conducted one of the Army's most important training missions back at Fort Riley. This mission was carried on by the battalion until 2009 when the responsibility was handed over to the Joint Readiness Training Center (JRTC) at Fort Polk, Louisiana.

In January 2006, the 2nd Battalion, 16th Infantry was reactivated at Fort Riley as a part of the newly organized 4th Brigade Combat Team (BCT), 1st Infantry Division. The 2nd Rangers reformed as a light infantry battalion under the Army's new modular concept. Just over a year later, in February 2007, the battalion deployed to eastern Baghdad as part of President's George W. Bush's Surge in Iraq.

The 2nd Battalion was assigned the mission of providing security in the southern area of the Tisa Nissan Qada (district) in southeastern Baghdad- a notoriously violent area which had been lawless even under the reign of Saddam Hussein. The Rangers succeeded in significantly reducing the insurgent threat by focusing on heavy local patrolling using small teams and unconventional tactics. By the time the battalion departed in 2008, its areas of the Tisa Nissan Qada had become one of the most secure areas in Baghdad.

On 1 September 2009, the 2nd Battalion, 16th Infantry returned to Iraq in support of Operation Iraqi Freedom, 2009–2011. This time the battalion operated in the vicinity of Bayji in north central Iraq. At Bayji, the battalion was assigned an advise and assist role with elements of the Iraqi 4th Infantry Division as well as with the local Iraqi Police forces which supported the local governments in its area of operations. After a more calm, though still dangerous tour this time around, the battalion returned to Fort Riley in late April and early May 2010, with the exception of A Company, which remained until that August.

==== War in Afghanistan ====
After performing the MiTT training mission for three years, the 1st Battalion began the process of reorganizing and training as one of the Army's new Combined Arms Battalions (CAB) in 2009. In January 2011, however, the 1st Battalion was deployed once again, this time on a unique mission to Afghanistan. For this deployment, the battalion was attached to the Combined Joint Special Operations Command-Afghanistan (CJSOCC-A) and assigned to support a new effort known as the Village Stability Operations (VSO) program. This program required that the battalion be broken down into squads and sometimes fire teams and distributed to selected villages throughout Regional Commands East, South, West, and North. The squads and teams worked with Special Forces Teams and other special operations forces to help the villagers raise detachments of Afghan Local Police (ALP) who would then provide security to the villages. Those assigned to Headquarters and Headquarters Company were sent out to different NATO members Provincial Reconstruction Teams in order to assist with information sharing and liaison between the countries. The 16th Infantry established this with Germany, Norway, and Hungary. Members of the 16th were even utilized by 1st Special Forces Group and Afghan Commandoes as Forward Logistical Elements supporting CENTOM level missions. The Iron Rangers returned to Fort Riley from Afghanistan in December 2011.

Even as the 1st Battalion was returning home, the 2nd Battalion was deploying on its third overseas tour of the GWOT. As with its brother battalion, the 2nd Rangers were sent to Afghanistan for this tour, this time to the eastern sections of Ghazni Province. In April 2012, the Rangers assumed responsibility for two districts and two Afghan National Army (ANA) kandaks (battalions). The battalion conducted daily combat patrols side by side with their Afghan partner units to influence and secure the local population throughout the districts. In August 2012, the 2nd Battalion underwent its first of several expansions to its AO when it assumed responsibility for a third district and a third ANA Kandak as the Surge forces in the country were being withdrawn. The new district brought new challenges, as the Rangers began patrolling the vital Highway 1 route between Kabul and Kandahar to ensure it remained open for commercial and military traffic. With reduced forces and additional ANA partners, the Rangers began to place the Afghans in the lead militarily. ANA units readily assumed responsibility for their own districts, demonstrating the sound tactical knowledge and hard-fought experience they had gained through years of fighting and US Army mentorship. With Afghans in the lead for all aspects of the fight, and local Afghans actively resisting the Taliban and other insurgent forces, the stage appeared set for the ISAF mission to soon come to a close within Afghanistan as the battalion ended its own tour. The 2nd Battalion arrived home in February 2013.

== Current structure ==
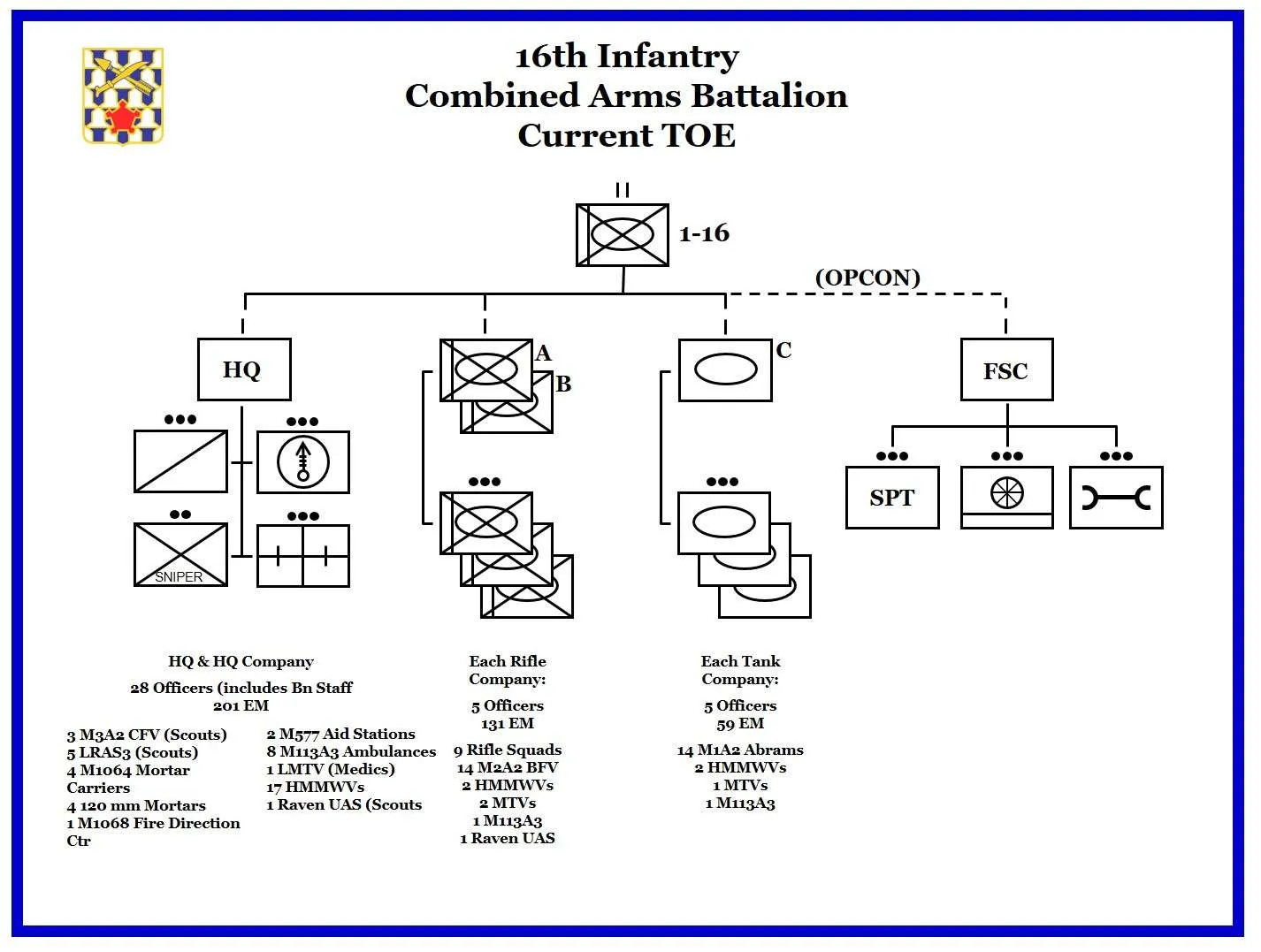
Current structure

== Notable members ==
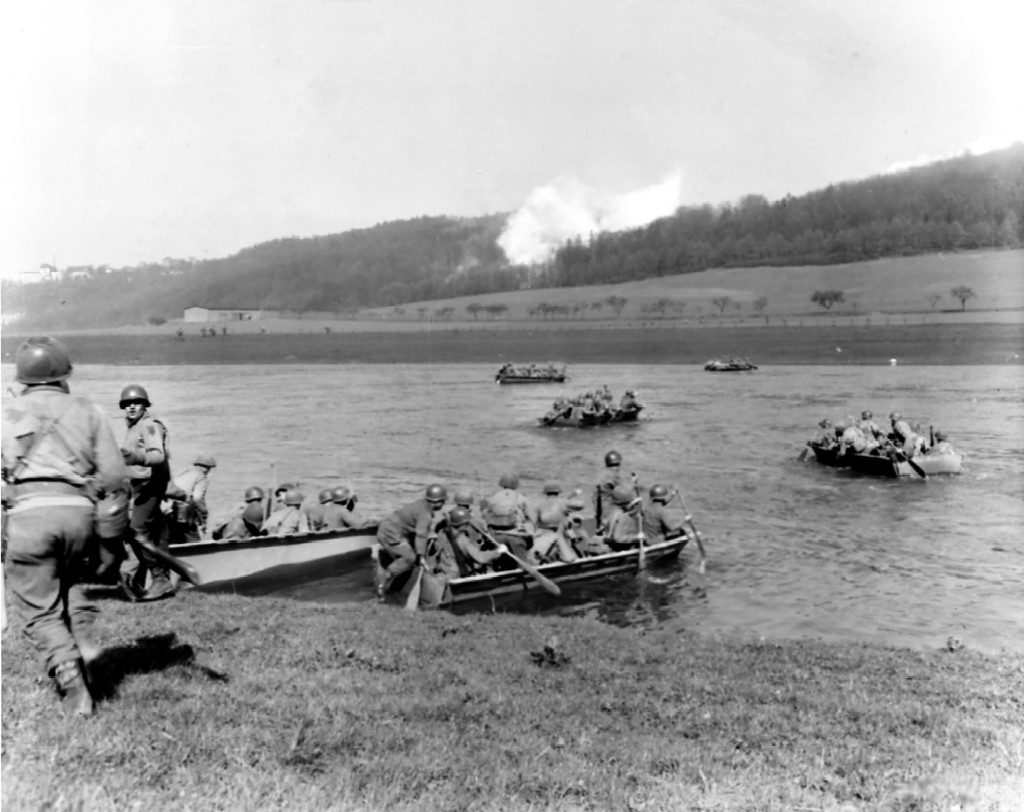
Crossing Weser river in April 1945.

- General Vincent K. Brooks, Commander, US Army Pacific, 2013–2016
- Major General Montgomery C. Meigs, Quartermaster General of the US Army, 1862-1882
- Major General Galusha Pennypacker, first commander of the 16th Infantry, 1869-1883
- Major General John K. Singlaub, Commander OSS Jedburgh Team JAMES, Head of CIA operations in post WW2 Manchuria, Commander of Military Assistance Command, Vietnam - Studies and Observation Group (MACV-SOG), Chief of Staff US Forces Korea, Key supporter of Nicaraguan Contras
- Major General Omar Bundy, Regimental Commander 1914–1915, Commander of 2nd Division in World War I
- General Wesley Clark, Supreme Allied Commander, Europe, 1997-2000
- Major General Stanley H. Ford, Commander of the 1st Infantry Division, VII Corps, VI Corps, and Second United States Army
- Samuel Fuller, Corporal, I Company in World War II; Screenwriter and director of the movie, The Big Red One
- Major General Frederick W. Gibb, Regimental Commander, World War II
- General John L. Hines, Chief of Staff, United States Army, 1924–26
- Lieutenant General Russel L. Honoré, Commander, First United States Army, 2004–08
- Major General Charles T. Horner Jr., Commander, 3rd Battalion 16th Infantry Regiment, World War II, Omaha Beach
- Lieutenant General Clarence R. Huebner, Commander, 1st Infantry Division (United States) & V Corps (United States), World War II
- General of the Army George Marshall, Chief of Staff, United States Army, 1939–45
- General Bruce Palmer Jr., Commander-in-Chief, U.S. Readiness Command, 1973–74
- Lieutenant General Walter Short, Commander, Hawaiian Department, 1941
- Major General Albert H. Smith Jr., S-3, 3rd Battalion 16th Infantry Regiment, World War II, Omaha Beach, ADC, 1st Infantry Division, Vietnam, Honorary Colonel of the Regiment, 1983–1990
- Brigadier General John Eisenhower, son of President Dwight D. Eisenhower, Ambassador to Belgium, historian and author
- Brigadier General George A. Taylor Regimental Commander, World War II
- Congressman (R, FL) Allen West, Battalion Task Force Fire Support Officer for 2d Battalion, 16th Infantry Regiment
- John Basilone
- General James K. Woolnough, Commander, Continental Army Command, 1967–70
- Bruce M. Wright, African American judge.
- Technical Sergeant Philip Streczyk, highly decorated WWII Soldier and one of the first men to make it off Easy Red Sector, Omaha Beach on D-Day

=== Medals of Honor ===
The following soldiers were awarded the Medal of Honor for actions while serving in the 16th Infantry Regiment.

| Name | Location | Date |
|---|---|---|
| 1LT Henry Clay Wood | Wilson's Creek, Missouri | 10 Aug 1861 |
| CPT James M. Cutts | The Wilderness, Spotsylvania, Petersburg | May–Oct 1864 |
| 1LT John H. Patterson | The Wilderness | 5 May 1864 |
| SGT Henry F. Schroeder | Carig, Philippine Islands | 14 Sep 1900 |
| 1LT Jimmie W. Monteith | Colleville-sur-Mer, France | 6 June 1944 |
| Tech5 John J. Pinder Jr. | Colleville-sur-Mer, France | 6 June 1944 |
| TSGT Jake W. Lindsey | Hamich, Germany | 16 Nov 1944 |
| SGT Alfred B. Nietzel | Heistern, Germany | 18 Nov 1944 |
| PVT Robert T. Henry | Luchem, Germany | 3 Dec 1944 |
| SGT James W. Robinson Jr. | Near Courtenay Plantation, Viet Nam | 11 Apr 1966 |
| SFC Matthew Leonard | Soui Da, Viet Nam | 28 Feb 1968 |

In addition, Air Force SSGT William H. Pitsenbarger of the Air Force's 38th Air Rescue and Recovery Squadron was posthumously awarded a Medal of Honor for actions in support of C Company, 2/16 Infantry in the Battle of Xa Cam My on April 11–12, 1966, part of Operation Abilene. This was the same action for which SGT James W. Robinson Jr. was also awarded the Medal of Honor. This action is the subject of the 2019 feature film The Last Full Measure.

== Honors ==
=== Campaign participation credit ===
- Civil War:
1. Peninsula
2. Manassas
3. Antietam
4. Fredericksburg
5. Chancellorsville
6. Gettysburg
7. Wilderness
8. Spotsylvania
9. Cold Harbor
10. Petersburg
11. Virginia 1862
12. Virginia 1863
- Indian Wars:
1. Cheyennes;
2. Utes;
3. Pine Ridge;
- Spanish–American War:
1. Santago
- Philippine–American War:
1. Luzon 1899
- Mexican Expedition
1. Mexico 1916-1917
- World War I:
1. Montdidier-Noyon;
2. Aisne-Marne;
3. St. Mihiel;
4. Meuse-Argonne;
5. Lorraine 1917;
6. Lorraine 1918;
7. Picardy 1918
- World War II:
1. Algeria-French Morocco (with arrowhead);
2. Tunisia;
3. Sicily (with arrowhead);
4. Normandy (with arrowhead);
5. Northern France;
6. Rhineland;
7. Ardennes-Alsace;
8. Central Europe
- Vietnam:
1. Defense;
2. Counteroffensive;
3. Counteroffensive, Phase II;
4. Counteroffensive, Phase III;
5. Tet Counteroffensive;
6. Counteroffensive, Phase IV;
7. Counteroffensive, Phase V;
8. Counteroffensive, Phase VI;
9. Tet 69/Counteroffensive;
10. Summer-Fall 1969;
11. Winter-Spring 1970
- Southwest Asia:
1. Defense of Saudi Arabia;
2. Liberation and Defense of Kuwait;
3. Cease-Fire
- Iraq:
1. Transition of Iraq;
2. Iraqi Governance;
3. Iraqi Surge;
4. Iraqi Sovereignty
- Afghanistan:
1. Afghanistan Consolidation III 2009-2011
2. Afghanistan Transition I 2011-2014
3. Global War on Terrorism Expeditionary Streamer-Kuwait
4. Global War on Terrorism Expeditionary Streamer-Horn of Africa

=== Decorations ===
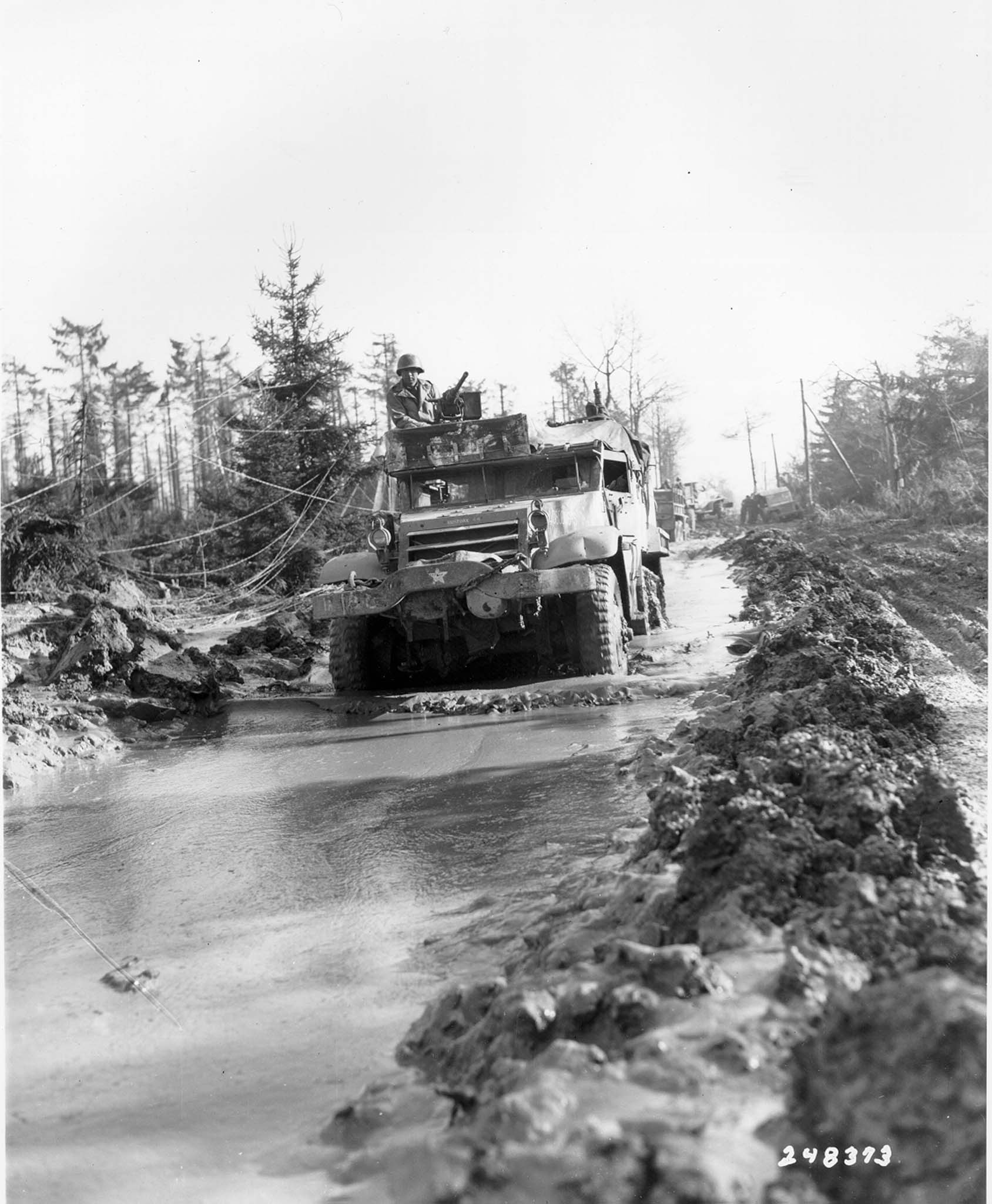
In Hurtgen Forest, February 1945

1. Presidential Unit Citation (Army), Streamer embroidered MATEUR, TUNISIA
2. Presidential Unit Citation (Army), Streamer embroidered SICILY
3. Presidential Unit Citation (Army) Streamer embroidered NORMANDY
4. Presidential Unit Citation (Army), Streamer embroidered HURTGEN FOREST
5. Presidential Unit Citation (Army), Streamer embroidered HAMICH, GERMANY
6. French Croix de Guerre with Palm, World War I, Streamer embroidered AISNE-MARNE
7. French Croix de Guerre with Palm, World War I, Streamer embroidered MEUSE-ARGONNE
8. French Croix de Guerre with Palm, World War II, Streamer embroidered KASSERINE
9. French Croix de Guerre with Palm, World War II, Streamer embroidered NORMANDY
10. French Médaille militaire, Streamer embroidered FRANCE
11. French Médaille militaire, Fourragère
12. Belgian Fourragère 1940
13. Cited in the Order of the Day of the Belgian Army for action at Mons
14. Cited in the Order of the Day of the Belgian Army for action at Eupen-Malmedy
15. Republic of Vietnam Cross of Gallantry with Palm, Streamer embroidered VIETNAM 1965–1968
16. Republic of Vietnam Cross of Gallantry with Palm, Streamer embroidered VIETNAM 1969
17. Republic of Vietnam Civil Action Honor Medal, First Class, Streamer embroidered VIETNAM 1965–1970
- Additional Honors 1st Battalion
1. Valorous Unit Award, Streamer embroidered AL ANBAR PROVINCE
2. Army Superior Unit Award, Streamer embroidered 2006-2009
- Company B additionally entitled to:
1. Meritorious Unit Commendation (Army), Streamer embroidered IRAQ Sep 2006-Aug 2007
2. Valorous Unit Award (Army), Streamer embroidered AFGHANISTAN APR-DEC 2011
- Company C additionally entitled to:
1. Meritorious Unit Commendation (Army), Streamer embroidered IRAQ Oct 2006-Jun 2007
- Company D additionally entitled to:
1. Valorous Unit Award, Streamer embroidered AFGHANISTAN Apr 2011-Dec 2011
- Additional Honors 2nd Battalion
1. Valorous Unit Award, Streamer embroidered IRAQ-KUWAIT 1991
2. Valorous Unit Award, Streamer embroidered BAGHDAD 2007-2008
3. Meritorious Unit Commendation (Army), Streamer embroidered IRAQ 2009-2010
4. Meritorious Unit Commendation (Army), Streamer embroidered AFGHANISTAN 2012-2013
- Company C additionally entitled to:
1. Valorous Unit Award, Streamer embroidered COURTENAY PLANTATION
- Additional Honors 5th Battalion

Valorous Unit Award, Streamer embroidered IRAQ-KUWAIT 1991

- Additional Honors Cannon Company
1. Presidential Unit Citation, Streamer embroidered GELA, SICILY 11 – 13 July 1943
- Additional Honors Service Company
1. Meritorious Unit Commendation, Streamer embroidered NORMANDY 6 June – 11 August 1944
- Additional Honors Medical Detachment
1. Meritorious Unit Commendation, Streamer embroidered NORMANDY 6 June – 11 August 1944

== In popular culture ==
- Jay Gatsby, antihero of the novel The Great Gatsby (1925), served with the 16th at Meuse and Argonne.
- The 16th Infantry was the featured unit in the motion picture The Big Red One.
- The 16th is also the regiment Fox Company of the game Call of Duty 2: Big Red One.
- The 1st Battle Group, 16th Infantry, was the unit filmed in the beach landing scenes in the 1961 movie The Longest Day.
- The 16th is the regiment where the exiled cherubim Denyel enlists in World War II in the Brazilian book Filhos do Éden - Anjos da Morte (Sons of Eden - Angels of Death).
- The 2-16 is the subject of David Finkel's book The Good Soldiers.
- The 2-16th is again the subject of another book by David Finkel. The second book, Thank You for Your Service, served as a follow on installment from his first book that chronicles the struggles of soldiers transitioning back to civilian life from the battlefields portrayed in The Good Soldiers.
- The 16th Infantry Regiment is the regiment of the protagonist of the 2017 video game Call of Duty: WWII.
- The actions of C/2/16th Infantry at the Battle of Xa Cam My are portrayed in the 2019 film The Last Full Measure about the award of the Medal of Honor to Air Force SSGT William H. Pitsenbarger.
- The 16th Infantry Regiment is a playable squad in the Invasion of Normandy campaign of the 2021 squad-based (MMO) World War II first-person shooter Enlisted.

== See also ==
- List of United States Regular Army Civil War units
