= Charles T. Horner Jr. =

United States Army officer (1916–1992)

Charles Thompson Horner, Jr.
- LTC Horner in 1944
- Born: May 6, 1916; Doylestown, Pennsylvania
- Died: April 4, 1992 (aged 75); Washington, D.C., United States
- Burial place: Arlington National Cemetery
- Spouse(s): Joan Mary (Davy) Horner (m. 1945–1992, until his death)
- Military career
- Allegiance: United States of America
- Branch: United States Army
- Service years: 1934-1973
- Rank: Major General
- Units: 16th Infantry Regiment; 1st Infantry Division
- Conflicts: World War II: North African Campaign; Allied invasion of Sicily; Normandy landings; European Campaign
- Awards: Distinguished Service Cross; Distinguished Service Medal (2); Silver Star (2); Bronze Star Medal (4) with "V" Device; Distinguished Service Order (U.K.)

Charles Thompson Horner Jr. (May 6, 1916 – April 4, 1992) was a highly decorated officer of the United States Army who served in the 16th Infantry Regiment, U.S. 1st Infantry Division from July 1940 to February 1946 and held every position from Platoon Leader to Regimental Commander. As a leader in the "Big Red One", he participated in the North Africa, Sicily, and the European Campaigns and three amphibious landings; the invasions of North Africa (Operation Torch), Sicily (Operation Husky), and Europe (Operation Overlord) where he commanded the 3rd Battalion, 16th Infantry on Omaha Beach.

== Major combat engagements ==
- Operation Torch (Invasion of North Africa): November 1942
- Tunisia Campaign: November 1942 - May 1943
  - Battle of the Kasserine Pass: February 1943
  - Battle of El Guettar: March - April 1943
- Operation Husky (Invasion of Sicily): July - August 1943
  - Battle of Troina: July–August 1943
- Western Front
  - Normandy Campaign
    - Operation Overlord (Allied Invasion of Europe): June 1944
      - Omaha Beach: 6 June 1944
    - Operation Cobra: July- August 1944
  - Battle of Aachen: October 1944
  - Battle of Hürtgen Forest: November 1944
  - Battle of the Bulge: December 1944 – January 1945

=== Omaha Beach: 6 June 1944 ===
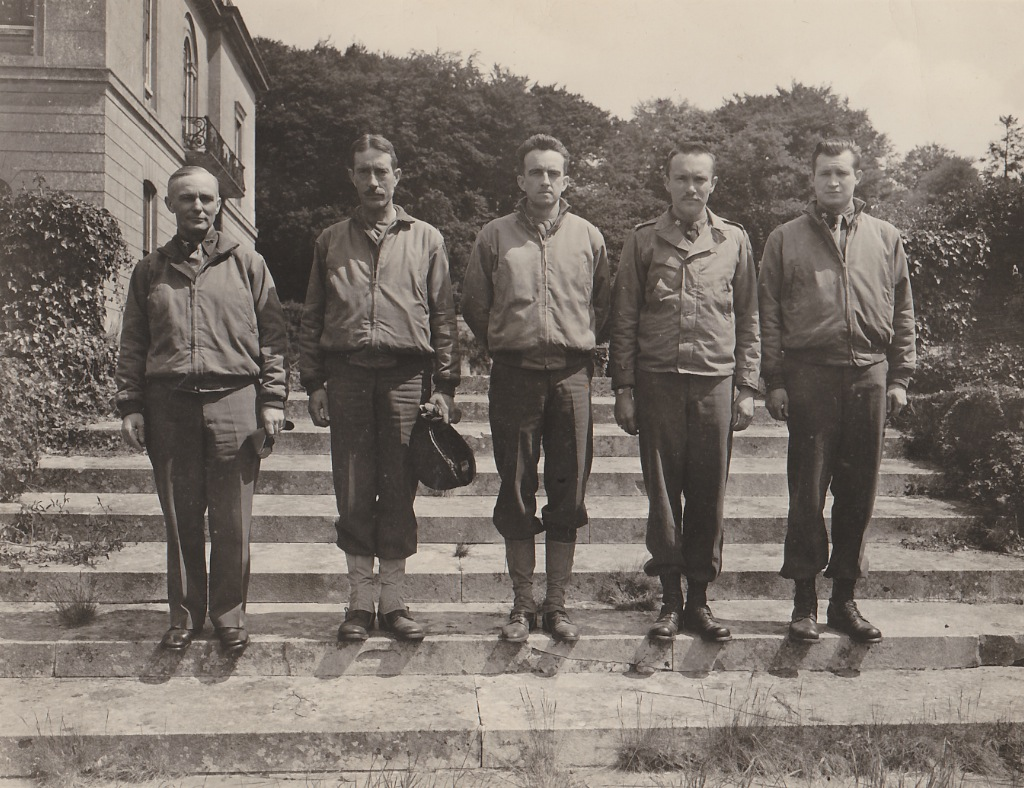
16th Infantry Regiment D-Day Commanders

LTC Horner (second from the right) commanded the 3rd Battalion, 16th Infantry, 1st Infantry Division during the initial assault on "Bloody Omaha". The following is a transcription of the 3rd Battalion After Action Report for D-Day. Photograph shows the D-Day 16th Infantry Regimental Combat Team (RCT) commanders taken just prior to the Normandy invasion.

 HEADQUARTERS THIRD BATTALION
 SIXTEENTH INFANTRY
 APO #1  U.S. ARMY
 23 June 1944
 
 SUBJECT: Unit Report on D-Day Operations
 TO: Commanding Officer, 16th Infantry

       At 1800 hours on 5 June 1944, the Third Battalion, 16th Infantry, and attached units on board “SS Empire Anvil” departed from the port of embarkation and in convoy headed for the coast of France.  At 0315 hours, 6 June 1944, with the men of “I” and “L” Companies loaded six LCA's per company and the order, ‘Lower boats’, was given.  These men were to make up the assault companies in the landing on Fox Green Beach.
       The objectives of the 3rd Battalion were to neutralize the beach defenses then swing east clearing the beach defenses and enemy strong points between beach exit and Port en Bessin; then seize and prepare to defend high ground 3000 yards south of Port en Bessin; contact the British on left; and build road blocks on likely approaches.
       The assault wave craft headed for their rendezvous area in a rough sea awaiting the minute to cross the LD and make the run to the beach.  Finally the navy gave the signal and the crafts headed for shore landing the men thirty minutes late because of heavy seas and poor visibility.  At this time, 0700 hours, all naval shelling had ceased, the air corps had failed to knock out beach defenses, and there was no supporting fire the beach defenses where the battalion landed.  Supporting tanks were also late – landing several minutes after our assault sections.  The DD tanks never did reach the shore.  As these craft approached shore they were greeted with all types of deadly fire.
       “L” Company landed on the right of Fox Green beach which was near the vicinity of Colleville Sur Mer.  The company consisted of the 1st, 2nd, 3rd, and 5th assault sections and company headquarters section.  The 4th section craft capsized in rough water shortly after debarking from the transport.  The assault landing craft touched in front of several rows of underwater obstacles – element “C”, tetrahedrons, and hedgehogs.  The personnel waded and struggled ashore by crossing 200 yards of open beach under intense enemy fire – machine gun, rifle, mortar, artillery, and anti-tank weapons.  Many men were hit and injured while still in the water.  The company gained comparative shelter of a vertical cliff where section leaders attempted to reorganize their men amid much confusion caused by enemy fire on the beach.  The company losses at this stage were high – 4th section was missing, 1st section landing craft was hit by artillery fire and 19 men of that section were missing.  The wounded in the other sections was as follows: 2nd Section – 5, 3rd section – 10, company headquarters – 4.  These losses reduced the strength from 187 to 123.  Company aid-men distinguished themselves by treating wounded while exposed to enemy fire.
       “I” Company was to be the left flank assault company but from the rendezvous area the navy headed their craft, by mistake, toward a beach west of Port en Bessin.  The alert Company Commander of “I” Company noticed the navy's error as they were about to land and ordered the boats to be taken back to the correct beach.  On the way back the craft carrying Lt. Funcheon and the 4th section and the craft with Lt. Cunningham and the 5th section were swamped and started to sink.  The personnel were picked up by a patrol boat and taken to another ship.  The time was now 0700 hours when Captain Richmond contacted Lt. Col. Horner, the Battalion Commander, a told him of the situation.  The Battalion Commander then ordered “K” Company to take over “I” Company's mission.
       At 0705 hours “K” Company came in on Fox Green beach in six boats.  All boats made the landing safely but two were blown up but mines shortly thereafter. Machine gun and sniper fire was sweeping the beach.  Enemy mortar and artillery fire had zeroed in on the beach causing heavy casualties.  “K” Company being pinned down on the beach upon landing, the riflemen took up positions behind an embankment at the high tide mark.  Lt. Brandt, Company Executive Officer, was wounded and later killed by the same shell that mortally wounded Captain Prucnal, the Company Commander, who was trying to reorganize his company which was spread out over the beach.  Lt. Zyblut was wounded while coming in from his landing craft.  Lt. Robinson was killed by a sniper while directing orders for the attack.
       The navy landed the C.P. group by mistake with the assault waves of the 2nd Battalion.  This group was pinned down on the beach until it was able to work its way down to our sector many hours later.  This group was led by Major White.
       The personnel of Company “M” made up the third wave which landed at 0750.  The situation on the beach made it impossible to approach the beach in prearranged orders.  Despite enemy machine gun, sniper, and artillery fire, “M” Company reached the beach with few casualties.  The officers attempted to reorganize their sections on the beach which was by this time crowded with men from the Infantry, Engineers, and Artillery.  The 1st section of machine guns, under Lt. Lazo, effectively engaged one of the pillboxes the enemy was manning and forced it to close it embrasure.  This support made it possible for elements of Company “K” and Company “L” to work their way up to one of the strong points later.  Lt. Booth managed to get one section into position from which it knocked out a fortified position where machine gun fire was coming and had pinned riflemen down on the beach.  The platoon sergeant reorganized the 2nd section.
       Under trying conditions, Lt. McCarty assembled his mortar platoon; had men collecting ammunition on the beach and placed his 81's in position to support the attack that was to follow.  When “I” Company landed Lt. McCarthy placed grenade launcher fire upon emplacements delivering fire upon the boats landing.
       At 0800 hours the four remaining boats of Company “I” attempter a landing.  The CP boat hit a mine and received machinegun fire directly in the boat.  The 2nd and 3rd section boats received direct artillery hits or blew up on a mine.  The remaining boat landed safely.  Although personnel on the beach had been pinned down they managed to set up a base of fire along the wall.
       At this point Captain Richmond organized as many men as he could locate from the battalion among the men now assembled on the beach, taking shelter of the small rise of the beach which gave protection from direct enemy fire.  A section of machine guns under Lt. Booth of Company “M” was ready to follow this assault group.  By this time Lt. McCarthy had four of his 81mm mortars in battery position under the cliff and sent observers with the rifle groups about to work their way to the strong points on top of the ridge.
       Captain Armellino was wounded while exposing himself to enemy fire in order to direct tank fire upon his company’s objectives.
       When Captain Richmond attempted to reorganize the battalion the situation was as follows: Lt. Cutler, commanding Company “L”, had already ordered Lt. Monteith to take his section up the draw; Lt. Williams to take his section up the right side of the draw.  These sections slowly advanced through mine fields, wire, and were subjected to sniper and machine gun fire.  Yard by yard they moved forward, killing the enemy and also receiving casualties.  After these sections finally reached the top of the draw they took up a hasty defensive positions until they made contact.  They then drove forward across the road and dug in waiting orders of the Company Commander. Lt Stumbaugh had led his section up the draw and then worked their way, against much opposition and fire, to the top of the high ground on the right and later contacted “L” Company which was in position on the left.
       While the action was going on there were on the beach about 15 men from Company “I” under Lt. Kemp and Lt. Godwin, in front of the left strong point.  In the center facing the draw were two sections of “K” Company men under Lt. Robinson.  On the right was a platoon of men from the 116th Infantry plus Lt. Klenk and part of his men.  It was from these positions that the men drove forward and up the Hill when the attack started.
       As they pushed off, Lt. Kemp's men started up the high ground to the fortified position.  Just before reaching it the Germans started to roll grenades down the hill, causing them to back down.  Then with the support of tank fire they started up again.  They had nearly reached the top and the Naval Support guns opened fire on the position requiring them to drop back again.  Finally when this supporting fire was lifted they took the position.  By this time Lt. Klenk and his men had taken the right strong point and came down the hill across the draw and up the left hill to aid in the attack with Lt. Kemp on the left strong point.
       The two sections of Company “K” pushed forward and mopped up the draw taking prisoners and knocking out machine guns.  Losses were sustained because of some stubborn resistance.
       Upon reaching the top of the high ground contact was made with the two sections of “L” Company with Lt. Cutler and Lt. Stumbaugh's section.  LT Klenk took twenty men and protected the left flank by placing his men in trenches on the left aided by a machine gun section placed in position on the left.
       Lt. Kemp took a section in the rear of the forward sections over to the high ground to mop up some Germans placing scattered machine gun fire on troops coming up the draw.
       During all this action many Germans were taken prisoner.  On this high ground reorganization was conducted and replacements which landed were brought up.  Patrol were sent out and machine guns were emplaced.
       A patrol from Company “L” (Mulander, Butt, and O’Dell) was captured in Cabourg when surrounded by 52 of the enemy. Pfc Mulander, who speaks German, talked the Germans into surrendering by telling them how helpless their plight was.  He then led the 52 Germans back through our lines and turned them over to the 2nd Battalion, 18th Infantry.
       In the meantime Captain Richmond sent out a strong combat patrol under Lt. Williams to take Le gd Hameau which was located about 1500 yards inland and to the east.  After a lapse of one hour he followed the combat patrol up with the remainder of his combined force which totaled 104 men –79 from “L” Company and the rest from Companies “I” and “K”.  Lt. Williams outposted the main road with five riflemen and a light machine gun.  After this had been done, a German scout car approached the town and was halted.  Of its two occupants one was taken prisoner and the other killed as he tried to escape.  Pfc Hodge who was manning a light machine gun capture two staff cars and one scout car which belong to the enemy.  Valuable papers, maps, and a complete radio set was taken from these cars.
       At about 2000 hours Lt. Col. Horner ordered the battalion to take up defensive positions around Le gd Hameau for the night – “K” Company on the left, “L” Company on the right, and “I” Company to the from.  Many enemy infiltrating patrols were encountered and driven off.  The following morning small enemy groups were mopped up behind our positions.  This battalion then prepared to move on.
       During the night 17 tanks from the 741st Tank Battalion were led up the draw to our positions where they prepared to support our advance the following day.
 
 For the Battalion Commander:
 KARL E. WOLF
 1st Lt., 16th Infantry
 Adjutant

== Citations ==
=== Silver Star ===
Major Horner was awarded the Silver Star for action in Oran, Algeria. The official U.S. Army citation for Major Horner's first Silver Star reads:

General Orders: Headquarters, 1st Infantry Division, General Orders No. 33 (December 7, 1942)
Action Date: 10 November 1942
Name: Charles T. Horner Jr.
Service: Army
Rank: Major
Company: Headquarters and Headquarters Company
Battalion: 2nd Battalion
Regiment: 16th Infantry Regiment
Division: 1st Infantry Division

Citation: The President of the United States of America, authorized by Act of Congress July 9, 1918, takes pleasure in presenting the Silver Star to Major (Infantry) [then Captain] Charles Thompson Horner, Jr. (ASN: 0-23530), United States Army, for gallantry in action while serving with Headquarters and Headquarters Company, 2d Battalion, 16th Infantry Regiment, 1st Infantry Division, in action east of Oran, Algeria, 10 November 1942. During the Oran offensive, two companies of the 2d Battalion, 16th Infantry Regiment separated because of heavy enemy machine-gun and artillery fire. Major (then Captain) Horner, on his own initiative, and with utter disregard of his personal safety, (Major Horner) crossed an open field under heavy fire, reunited the two companies, and personally led them in an assault against a heavily-fortified enemy position. Major Horner's action was a decided factor in the successful assault of that position, and his sound judgment and disregard of his personal safety were an inspiration to the officers and men of the 2d Battalion, 16th Infantry Regiment.

=== Distinguished Service Cross ===
Major Horner was awarded the Distinguished Service Cross for action in Troina, Sicily. The official U.S. Army citation for Major Horner's Distinguished Service Cross reads:

General Orders: Headquarters, First U.S. Army, General Orders No. 31 (July 1, 1944)
Action Date: July 29, 1943
Name: Charles T. Horner Jr.
Service: Army
Rank: Major
Company: Commanding Officer
Battalion: 3rd Battalion
Regiment: 16th Infantry Regiment
Division: 1st Infantry Division

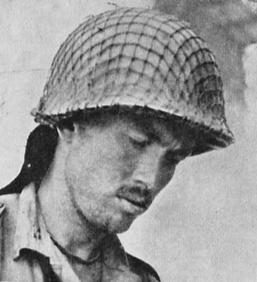
Photo of Major Charles T. Horner Jr. (Likely taken during the battle of Troina, Sicily.

Citation: The President of the United States of America, authorized by Act of Congress July 9, 1918, takes pleasure in presenting the Distinguished Service Cross to Major (Infantry) Charles Thompson Horner, Jr. (ASN: 0-23530), United States Army, for extraordinary heroism in connection with military operations against an armed enemy while serving as Commanding Officer, 3d Battalion, 16th Infantry Regiment, 1st Infantry Division, in action against enemy forces on 29 July 1943 near Troina, Sicily. On at least two occasions during the battle for the city of Troina, by his magnificent personal leadership and incomparable bravery, he inspired and rallied the members of his command so that they were enabled to seize and retain their hard won objectives. In the final assault on the city, Lieutenant Colonel Horner, with rifle in hand, personally led his men up the towering sides of the mountain guarding this bristling fortress and in the heat of the salvage battle for the city, so inspired his men by his example of bravery that they pressed on in the face of tremendous odds to take their final objective and enter the city with Lieutenant Colonel Horner at the front of his battalion. By his outstanding leadership and heroic effort, Major Horner acted in keeping with the highest traditions of the Armed Forces. General Orders: Headquarters, U.S. Army-North African Theater of Operations, General Orders No. 28 (1944)

=== Silver Star (First Oak Leaf Cluster) ===
LTC Horner was awarded the Silver Star (First Oak Leaf Cluster) for action near Hamich, Germany.

General Orders: Headquarters, 1st Infantry Division, General Orders No. 137 (December 4, 1944)
Action Date: 18–19 November 1944
Name: Charles T. Horner Jr.
Service: Army
Rank: Lieutenant Colonel
Company: Headquarters
Battalion: 3rd Battalion
Regiment: 16th Infantry Regiment
Division: 1st Infantry Division
Citation: For gallantry in action in the vicinity of Hamich, Germany, 18–19 November 1944. Fearlessly exposing himself to automatic, small-arms, and tank fire during a fierce engagement with the enemy, Colonel Horner advanced across hazardous terrain and skillfully directed effective artillery bombardment of the foe. Colonel Horner's gallantry and unwavering devotion to duty exemplify the finest traditions of the service. Entered service from Pennsylvania. Address: Care of the Adjutant General, Washington 25, D.C.

=== Distinguished Service Order (UK) ===
LTC Horner was awarded the Distinguished Service Order (DSO) for his actions which occurred two days after the beginning of the Battle of the Bulge while attached to the British 21st Army Group. The DSO is the British equivalent of the U.S. Distinguished Service Cross, and is second only to the Victoria Cross. The official citation for LTC Horner's Distinguished Service Order reads:

Action Date: December 18, 1944
Name: Charles T. Horner Jr.
Service: Army
Rank: Lieutenant Colonel
Company: Commanding Officer
Battalion: 3rd Battalion
Regiment: 16th Infantry Regiment
Division: 1st Infantry Division
Corps: V
Citation: While making a motorized reconnaissance in the vicinity of Weimes, Belgium, on December 18, 1944, Lieutenant Colonel Horner observed a group of enemy paratroopers armed with automatic and semi-automatic weapons rounding up American members of a field hospital as prisoners. As his vehicle come into view, it was subjected to intense fire from the enemy group. Courageously, he dismounted and opened fire with his carbine upon the Germans. Greatly outnumbered, he ran toward the enemy to engage them in combat and refused to take cover from heavy small arms and automatic weapons fire placed upon him. So confused were the Germans by this valiant officer’s contempt for their fire that they became completely disorganized and made a hasty retreat. The extraordinary courage displayed by Lieutenant Colonel Horner in attacking singlehandedly a group of heavily armed Germans resulted in the release of an entire platoon of the field hospital.
Recommender: Courtney H. Hodges, Lieutenant General, USA, Commanding General, First U.S. Army.
Approver: B.L. Montgomery, Field Marshal, Commander, 21st Army Group.
Signed: George VI, King of the United Kingdom and the Dominions of the British Commonwealth.

== Awards and decorations ==
Badges

Combat Infantryman Badge
Army Staff Identification Badge

Awards and Decorations

Distinguished Service Cross
Army Distinguished Service Medal with oak leaf cluster
Silver Star with oak leaf cluster
Bronze Star with "V" Device and three oak leaf clusters
Army Commendation Medal
American Defense Service Medal
American Campaign Medal
European–African–Middle Eastern Campaign Medal
World War II Victory Medal
Army of Occupation Medal
National Defense Service Medal
Armed Forces Expeditionary Medal
Vietnam Service Medal
Distinguished Service Order (UK)

Unit Citations

Presidential Unit Citation
Meritorious Unit Commendation

== Bibliography ==
- Atkinson, Rick, An Army at Dawn: The War in North Africa 1942-1943, Henry Holt and Company, 2002.
- Balkoski, Joseph, Omaha Beach: D-Day, June 6, 1944, Stackpole Books, 2004.
- Baumgartner, John W. – De Poto, Al – Fraccio, William – Fuller, Sammy, 16th Infantry Regiment: 1798-1946, Cricket Press, 1995. Previously published in 1946.
- Bernage, Georges, Omaha Beach, Heimdal, 2002.
- Dolski, Michael, D-Day Remembered: The Normandy Landings in American Collective Memory, University of Tennessee Press, 2016.
- Finke, Blythe Foote, No Mission Too Difficult: Old Buddies of the 1st Division Tell All About World War II, Contemporary Books, 1995.
- Hastings, Max, OVERLORD: D-Day and the Battle for Normandy, Simon & Schuster, 2015.
- Kaufmann, J.E. and H.W., The American GI in Europe in World War II: D-Day - Storming Ashore, Stackpole Books, 2009.
- MacDonald, Charles B., A Time for Trumpets: The Untold Story of the Battle of the Bulge, Harper Collins, 1997.
- MacDonald, Charles B., The Siegfried Line Campaign, Center of Military History, United States Army, 1984. Previously published in 1963.
- Mason, Stanhope B., Danger Forward: The Story of the First Infantry Division in World War II, Pickle Partners Publishing, 2016. Previously published in 1947.
- McManus, John C., The Dead and Those About to Die: D-Day: The Big Red One at Omaha Beach, Penguin, 2014.
- Miller, Edward, A Dark and Bloody Ground: The Hürtgen Forest and the Roer River Dams, 1944 – 1945 College Station, TX: Texas A & M University Press, 1995.
- Whitehead, Don, Beachhead Don: Reporting the War from the European Theater: 1942-1945, Fordham University Press, 2004.
- Whitlock, Flint, The Fighting First: The Untold Story of the Big Red One on D-Day, Westview Press, 2004.

== Media ==
- The Big Red One written and directed by Samuel Fuller, A 1980 feature length war film capturing the World War II exploits of four soldiers of the 3rd Battalion, 16th Infantry Regiment, 1st Infantry Division. The stars included Lee Marvin, Mark Hamill, Robert Carradine, Bobby Di Cicco.
