= Comanche campaign =

Military operations by the United States government against the Comanche tribe

Date	1867–1875
Location	Texas, United States
Result	United States victory: Comanche surrender and relocation

Belligerents
United States	Comanche

Commanders and leaders
(United States) William T. Sherman (United States) Ranald Mackenzie	Quanah Parker

The Comanche campaign is a general term for military operations by the United States government against the Comanche tribe in the newly settled west. Between 1867 and 1875, military units fought against the Comanche people in a series of expeditions and campaigns until the Comanche surrendered and relocated to a reservation.

== Background ==
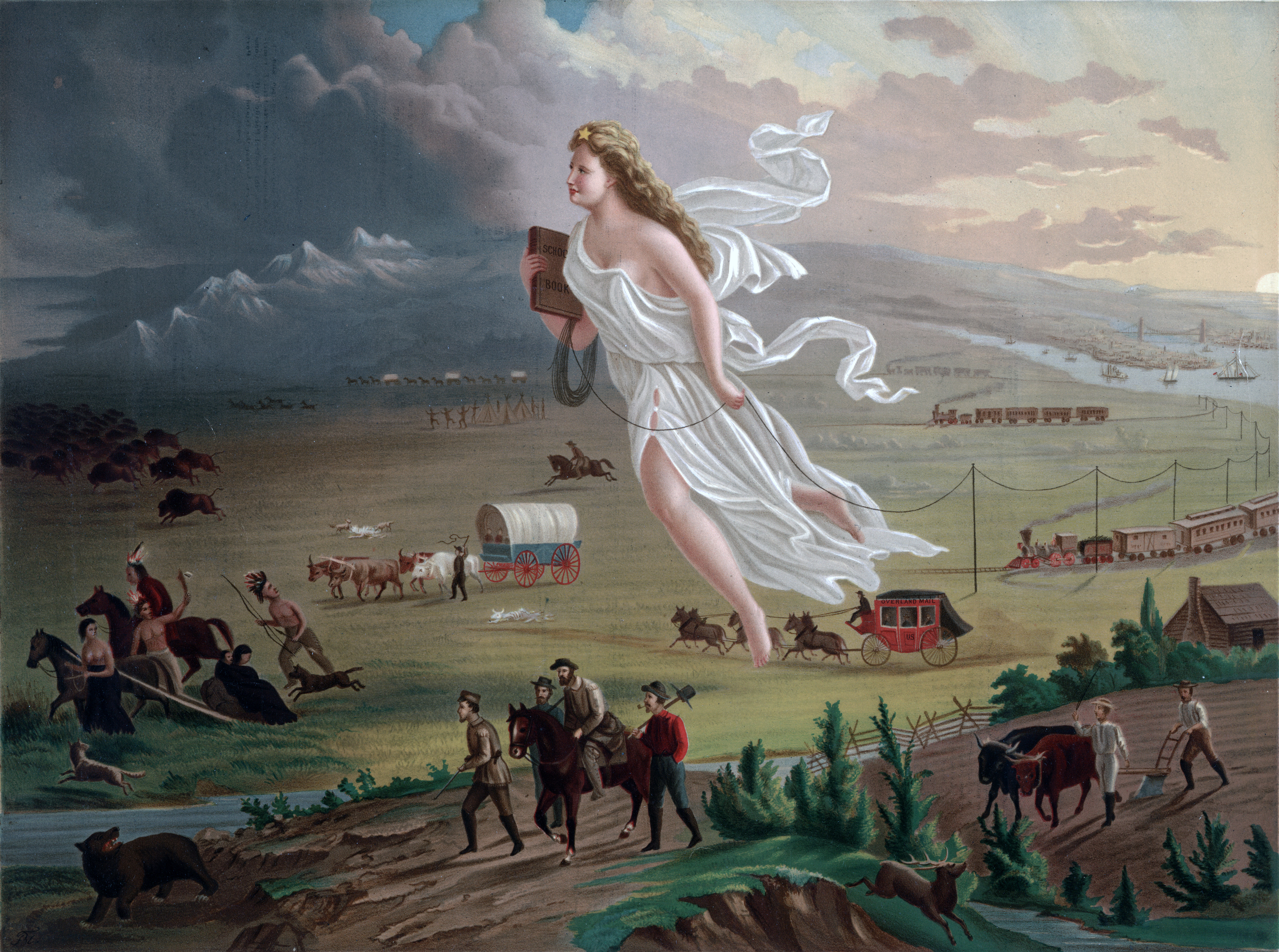
This painting (circa 1872) by John Gast called American Progress, is an allegorical representation of the modernization of the new west. Here Columbia, a personification of the United States, leads civilization westward with American settlers, stringing telegraph wire as she sweeps west; she holds a school book. The different stages of economic activity of the pioneers are highlighted and, especially, the changing forms of transportation.

Western settlement brought the Spanish, French, English, and American settlers into regular contact with the native tribes of the region. Many of these Indians were friendly, and received the new settlers gladly, offering to trade and coexist peacefully, while other tribes resisted the newcomers. The idea of Manifest Destiny as well as the Homestead Act pushed American and immigrant settlers further west, thereby creating more competition for a finite amount of land. This competition for land created tension between the Anglo settlers and the Natives of the region. In an effort to prevent conflicts in the area, many treaties were signed promising land and peace between the two parties, but such treaties were rarely honored. The Comanche tribe was one of the main sources of native resistance in the region that became Oklahoma and Texas, and often came into conflict with both other tribes and the newer settlers. With the outbreak of the Civil War, some Indian tribes attempted to align themselves with what they believed would be the winning side. In the case of the Comanche, the tribe signed a treaty with the Confederacy, and when the war ended they were forced to swear loyalty to the United States government at Fort Smith. This did little to end the cycle of raiding which had come to typify this region. Spreading over a large expanse of the southern plains, the Comanche fought hard diplomatically to maintain power in the region they controlled. In the Treaty of Little Arkansas in 1865, the Comanche tribe was awarded a large piece of land spanning parts of Oklahoma and Texas. Some parts of this region, called the Comancheria, soon became part of the Indian reservation.

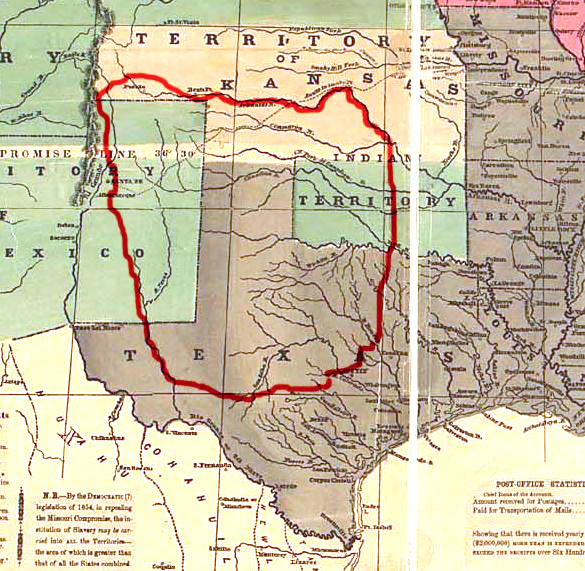
A map showing Comanche lands Comancheria during the 1800s.

This treaty was later followed by the Medicine Lodge Treaty in 1867, which helped to solidify the reservation system for the Plains Indians. These policies eventually became part of President Ulysses S. Grant's Peace Policy, which prioritized missionary work and education over fighting. President Grant's Peace Policy became an important part of the white-Indian relations for a number of years.

== "Comanche campaign" ==
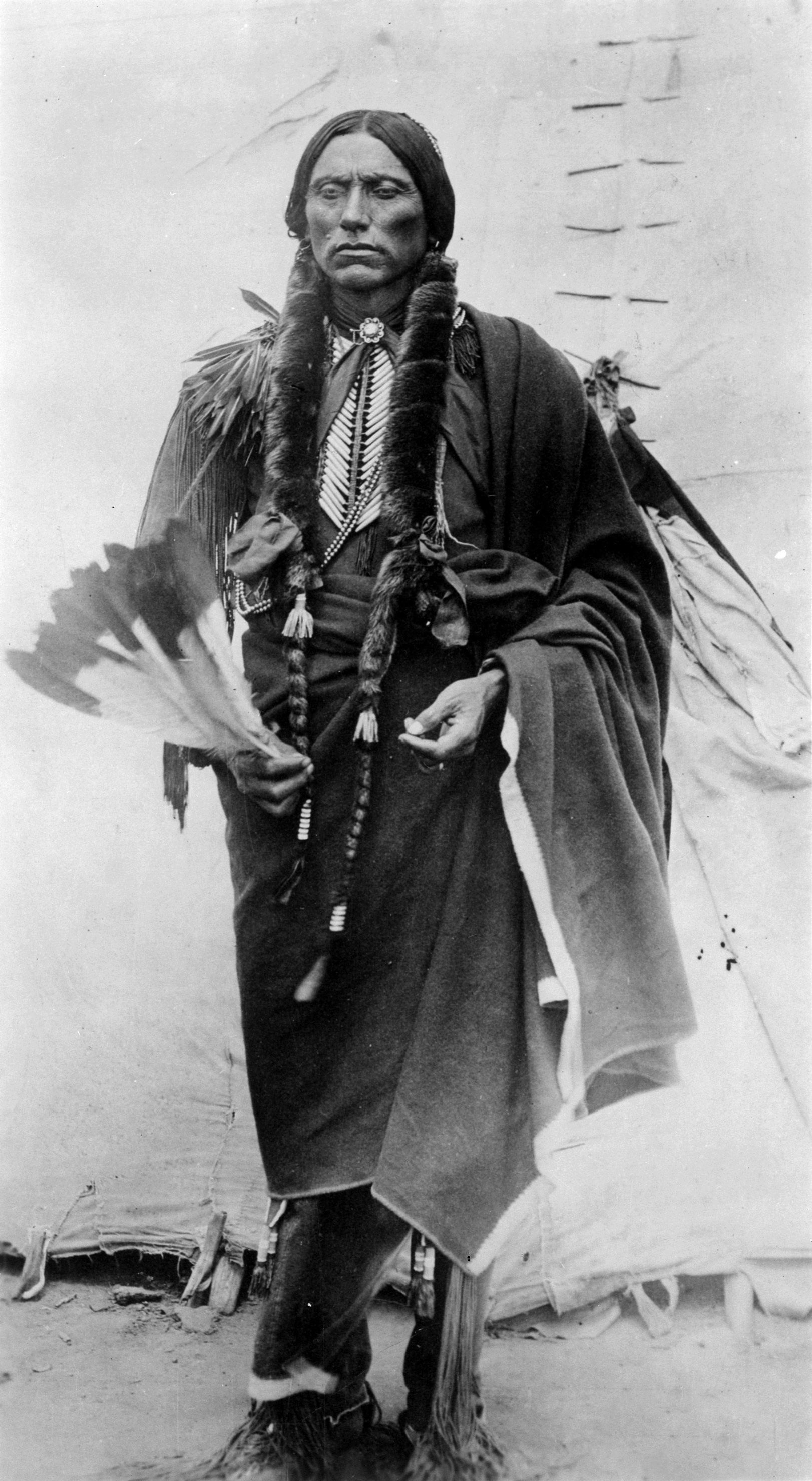
Quanah Parker, prominent Comanche leader, in ceremonial regalia, ca. 1892

A faction of the Comanche tribe, the Quahadi, was arguably the most resistant towards the Anglo settlers. Skeptical of what they would bring, the Quahadi avoided contact with these men. Goods were never exchanged between the groups, and because of this seclusion they were largely unaffected by the cholera plagues in 1816 and 1849. The Quahadi were noted for their fierce nature; so much so that other Comanche feared them. They were the wealthiest of the Comanche in terms of horses and cattle, and they had never signed a peace treaty. It was this faction of the Comanche that gave the American troops the most trouble during this period. General William T. Sherman sent four cavalry companies from the United States Army to capture the Indians responsible for the Warren Wagon raid, but this assignment eventually developed into eliminating the threat of the Comanche tribe, namely Quanah Parker and his Quahadi. Following on the heels of the Civil War, the Army had a low number of recruits, and very little money to pay the soldiers they did have, so few men were sent west to fight the Indian threat. Approximately 5,000 enlisted men, divided into ten regiments made up the American forces that would face the powerful Comanche. General Sherman picked Ranald S. Mackenzie, described by President Grant as "the most promising young officer in the army," commanding the 4th Cavalry, to lead the attack against the Comanche tribe. Mackenzie and his men developed a style of fighting designed to slowly defeat the Comanche rather than face them in open battle. Colonel Mackenzie embarked on several expeditions into the Comancheria in an effort to destroy the Comanche winter camps and crops, as well as their horses and cattle. Reminiscent of General Sherman's "March to the Sea," the 4th Cavalry fought the Comanche by destroying their means of survival.

=== Llano Estacado ===
In the fall of 1871, Mackenzie and his 4th Cavalry, as well as two companies in the 11th Infantry, arrived in Texas, began to seek out their target. The campaign began in the Llano Estacado region where Comanche were rumored to have been camping. In his first expedition, Mackenzie and his men attacked these camps twice. The campaign began with the Battle of Blanco Canyon. Through the use of Tonkawa scouts, Mackenzie was able to track Quanah Parker's faction, and save another group of American soldiers from slaughter. They succeeded in pushing the Quahadi far into the region before they were forced to abandon the hunt for the winter. The second expedition lasted longer than the first, from September to November, and succeeded in making it clear to the Comanche that the peace policy was no longer in effect. Mackenzie established a strong border patrol at several forts in the area, such as Fort Richardson, Fort Griffin, and Fort Concho. While there was little direct combat between the two forces, the American tactics were successful. By following the Comanche tribe throughout the region and destroying each of their camps, Mackenzie and his cavalry were able to hinder the Comanche's ability to prepare properly for winter. Mackenzie's third expedition, in September 1872, was the largest. Capturing 130 Indian women and children, stealing horses, and ransacking Indian camps, Mackenzie and the Fourth Cavalry spanned the region several times with the assistance of the Twenty-fourth Infantry and his Tonkawa scouts. These captives were later used in a deal made between the soldiers at Fort Sill and the Comanche tribe: peace in exchange for hostages. The Comanche agreed to the terms, and there was a period of peace in the region. During this period of peace, Mackenzie continued to map and explore the Llano Estacado region through the south and central areas, while also creating a second front in the west in order to separate the Comanche from their source of weapons and food. In the winter of 1873, record numbers of Comanche people resided at Fort Sill, and after the exchange of hostages, there was a noticeable drop in violence between the Anglos and the Native Indians. However, in an attempt to finalize the submission of the Comanche people, there was a movement towards bison hunting. The species became threatened as a result, and those Comanche people who were not at Fort Sill were on the brink of starvation. The remaining Native American Tribes began to gather at the North Fork of the Red River, the center of the slowly diminishing Comancheria region. Due to tensions between them and the Indian Office, the Indians saw the withholding of rations as a declaration of war, and acted accordingly.

=== Red River War ===
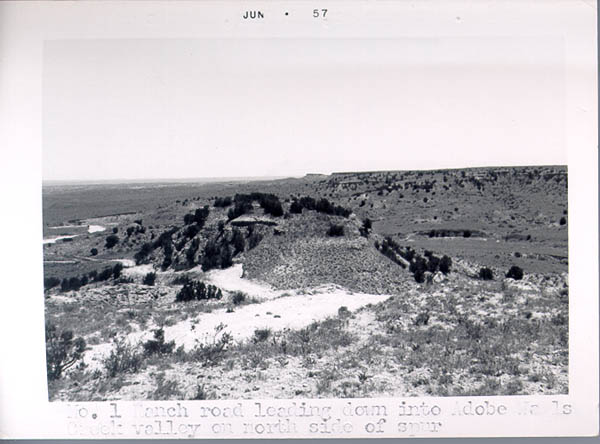
Adobe Walls battlefield

The Second Battle of Adobe Walls in 1874 was one of the opening engagements of the summer and fall campaign in 1874, even though it did not involve military personnel. After the attack, federal officials issued an order stating that all Southern Plains Indians were expected to be living on their designated reservation lands by August 1, 1874. After the deadline passed, approximately 2,000 Comanche remained in the Comancheria region. When they refused to relocate, the United States government dispatched 1,400 soldiers, launching an operation that became known as the Red River War.

One of the deciding battles of the Red River War was fought at Palo Duro Canyon on September 28, 1874. Colonel Mackenzie and his Black Seminole Scouts and Tonkawa scouts surprised the Comanche, as well as a number of other tribes, and destroyed their camps. The battle ended with only three Comanche casualties, but resulted in the destruction of both the camp and the Comanche pony herd. This defeat spelled the end of the war between the Comanche and the Americans.

== Aftermath ==
Following the Red River War, a campaign that lasted from August–November in 1874, the Comanche surrendered and moved to their new lands on the reservation. However even after that loss, it was not until June 1875 that the last of the Comanche, those under the command of Quanah Parker, finally surrendered at Fort Sill. Though the U.S. troops themselves were directly responsible for just a few hundred deaths, their tactics in the Comanche campaign were the most devastating to the tribe. The tactics they used eventually led to the economic, rather than military, downfall of the tribe. The Comanche tribe, starting with nearly 5,000 people in 1870, finally surrendered and moved onto the reservation with barely 1,500 remaining in 1875.

== See also ==
- Comanche
- Cow camp massacre, 1866 attack on three teen-aged boys
- Texas-Indian Wars
- Red River War
- Native Americans in the United States
- Indian Campaign Medal
