= William Foster (Medal of Honor) =

British-born soldier in the U.S. Army

- Born: 1832; Somerset, England, United Kingdom
- Died: July 16, 1880 (aged 48); San Francisco, California, United States
- Burial place: San Francisco National Cemetery
- Military career
- Allegiance: United States of America
- Branch: United States Army
- Service years: c. 1872–1873
- Rank: Sergeant
- Unit: 4th U.S. Cavalry
- Conflicts: Indian Wars; Texas–Indian Wars; Battle of the North Fork of the Red River
- Awards: Medal of Honor

Sergeant William Foster (1832 – July 16, 1880) was a British-born soldier in the U.S. Army who served with the 4th U.S. Cavalry during the Texas–Indian Wars. He received the Medal of Honor for gallantry against the Comanche Indians at the Red River in Texas on September 29, 1872.

== Biography ==
William Foster was born in Somerset, England in 1832. He emigrated to the United States and later enlisted in the U.S. Army in Bakersville, Maryland. Spending much of his military career on the frontier, Foster participated in campaigns against the Southern Plains Indians for over 20 years becoming a veteran Indian fighter and may have had a rudimentary knowledge of Indian dialects. By the early 1870s, he was a sergeant in Company F of the 4th U.S. Cavalry then stationed in Texas.

On September 28, 1872, he was part of Colonel Ranald S. Mackenzie's expedition over the Staked Plains. Following a one-day march to the North Fork of the Red River, a lodge encampment of around 280 Mow-wi Comanche warriors was discovered. Though vastly outnumbered, MacKenzie ordered an attack hoping to catch the Comanche by surprise. The soldiers approached, however, startled the Indian's ponies and started a stampede alerting the camp. In the ensuing battle, the cavalry troopers engaged in fierce fighting with the Comanche warriors. As a result of MacKenzie's victory, the Mow-wi formally surrendered at Fort Sill ending 17 years of warfare. Foster was among those who distinguished themselves in the fight and, with eight other members of his regiment, received the Medal of Honor for "gallantry in action". The other men awarded the MOH included Blacksmith James Pratt, Farrier David Larkin, Privates Edward Branagan and William Rankin, Corporals Henry McMasters and William O'Neill, Sergeant William Wilson and First Sergeant William McNamara. Foster eventually left the military and settled in San Francisco, California, where he died on July 16, 1880, at the age of 48. He is among the 35 MOH recipients interred at San Francisco National Cemetery.

== Medal of Honor citation ==
Rank and organization: Sergeant, Company F, 4th U.S. Cavalry. Place and date: At Red River, Tex., September 29, 1872. Entered service at: ------. Birth: England, Date of issue: November 19, 1872.

Citation:

Gallantry in action.

== See also ==
- List of Medal of Honor recipients for the Indian Wars
