= William McNamara (soldier) =

- Born: ~1835; County Mayo, Ireland,
- Died: March 16, 1912 (aged 72); New York, New York, United States
- Burial place: Calvary Cemetery, Grave #8 Plot D Section 12 Range 26 Woodside, New York 11377
- Military career
- Allegiance: United States
- Branch: United States Army
- Service years: 1856 – 1887
- Rank: First Sergeant
- Unit: 4th U.S. Cavalry Troop F
- Conflicts: American Civil War; Indian Wars; Texas–Indian Wars: Battle of the North Fork of the Red River; Battle of North Fork of the Powder River
- Awards: Medal of Honor

First Sergeant William McNamara (c. 1835 – March 16, 1912) was an Irish-born soldier in the U.S. Army who served with the 4th U.S. Cavalry during the Texas–Indian Wars. He received the Medal of Honor for gallantry against the Comanche Indians at the Red River in Texas on September 29, 1872.

== Biography ==
William McNamara was born in County Mayo, Ireland about 1835. He emigrated to the United States and enlisted in the U.S. Army in Baltimore, Maryland. Spending much of his military career after the Civil War on the frontier, McNamara participated in campaigns against the Southern Plains Indians for over 20 years, becoming a veteran Indian fighter. By the early 1870s, he was a First sergeant in Company F of the fourth U.S. Cavalry then stationed in Texas.

On September 28, 1872, he was part of Colonel Ranald S. Mackenzie's expedition over the Staked Plains. Following a one-day march to the North Fork of the Red River, a lodge encampment of around 280 Mow-wi Comanche warriors was discovered. Though vastly outnumbered, MacKenzie ordered an attack hoping to catch the Comanche by surprise. The soldiers approached, however, startled the Indian's ponies and started a stampede alerting the camp. In the ensuing battle, the cavalry troopers engaged in fierce fighting with the Comanche warriors. As a result of MacKenzie's victory, the Mow-wi formally surrendered at Fort Sill ending 17 years of warfare. McNamara was among those who distinguished themselves in the fight and, with eight other members of his regiment, received the Medal of Honor for "gallantry in action". The other men awarded the MOH included Blacksmith James Pratt, Farrier David Larkin, Privates Edward Branagan and William Rankin, Corporals Henry McMasters and William O'Neill, Sergeants William Wilson and William Foster. McNamara eventually left the military and settled in New York City, rejoining his children, where he died on 1912, at the age of 72.

== Medal of Honor citation ==
Rank and organization: First Sergeant, Company F, fourth U.S. Cavalry. Place and date: At Red River, Tex., September 29, 1872. Entered service at: ------. Birth: Ireland, Date of issue: November 19, 1872.
