= William O'Neill (Medal of Honor) =

American soldier in the U.S. Army

- Born: c. 1848; Tariffville, Connecticut, United States
- Died: Unknown
- Military career
- Allegiance: United States
- Branch: United States Army
- Service years: c. 1871–1872
- Rank: Corporal
- Unit: 4th U.S. Cavalry
- Conflicts: Indian Wars; Red River War; Battle of the North Fork of the Red River
- Awards: Medal of Honor

William O'Neill (c. 1848 – unknown) was an American soldier in the U.S. Army who served with the 4th U.S. Cavalry during the Indian Wars. He was one of several men who received the Medal of Honor for gallantry while fighting the Comanche at Red River of the South on September 29, 1872.

== Biography ==
William O'Neill was born in Tariffville, Connecticut in about 1848. He later moved to New York City, New York where he enlisted in the U.S. Army. O'Neill was assigned to frontier duty with Company I of the 4th U.S. Cavalry and later took part in the Red River War. In late-September 1872, O'Neill was among the cavalry troopers who followed Colonel Ranald Slidell Mackenzie in an expedition over the Staked Plains of Texas. After a one-day march to reach the North Fork of the Red River, his regiment encountered large encampment of 280 Comanche warriors on September 29. Although the cavalrymen attempted to take the enemy by surprise, the Indians' ponies stampeded at the soldiers approach alerting the camp. Engaged in fierce combat with the Comanche, O'Neill and his company led the advance and were able to secure the camp with the loss of only one trooper killed and three others wounded. The Mow-wi tribe of Comanche, who lost 23 braves in the battle, were humbled by this victory and surrendered at Fort Sill ending 17 years of continuous warfare. On November 19, 1872, O'Neill was among the soldiers who received the Medal of Honor for "bravery in action". A memorial marker was also erected in his memory at Fort Concho National Historic Landmark in San Angelo, Texas.

== Medal of Honor citation ==
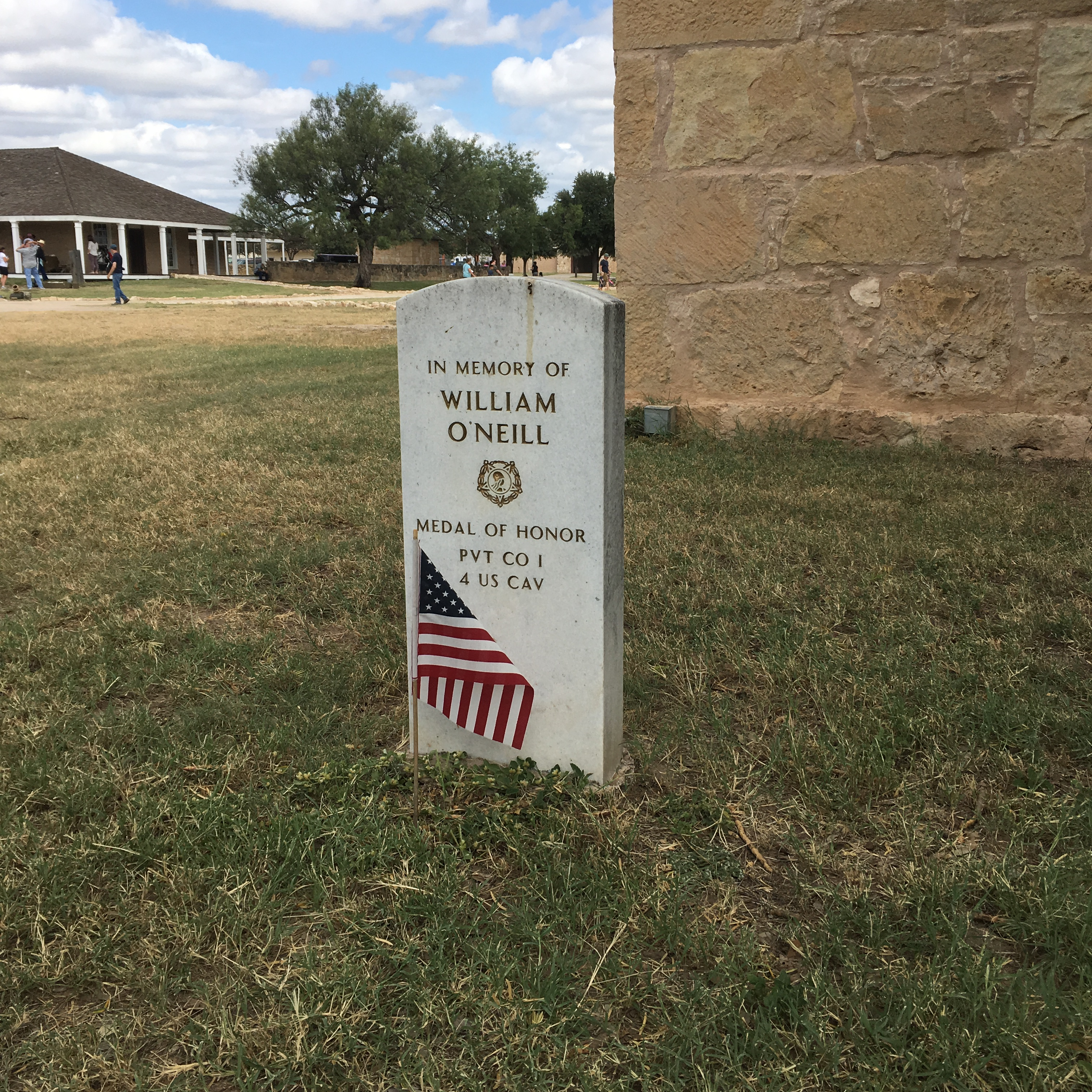
Memorial headstone located at Fort Concho, San Angelo, Texas, base of the 4th Cavalry

Rank and organization: Corporal, Company I, 4th U.S. Cavalry. Place and date: At Red River, Tex., 29 September 1872. Entered service at: ------. Birth: Tariffville, Conn. Date of issue: 19 November 1872.

Citation:

Bravery in action.

== See also ==
- List of Medal of Honor recipients for the Indian Wars
