= William Wilson (soldier, born 1847) =

US Army Medal of Honor recipient twice (1847–1895)

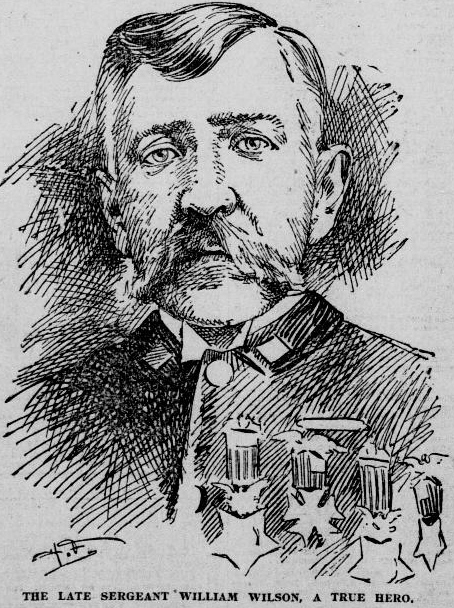
- Sgt. William Wilson, 1895
- Born: 1847; Philadelphia, Pennsylvania, U.S.
- Died: December 22, 1895 (aged 47–48); Presidio, San Francisco, California, U.S.
- Burial place: San Francisco National Cemetery
- Military career
- Allegiance: United States of America
- Branch: United States Army
- Rank: Sergeant
- Unit: 4th U.S. Cavalry
- Conflicts: Battle of the North Fork of the Red River
- Awards: Medal of Honor (2)

William Wilson (1847 – December 22, 1895) was a United States soldier who served with the United States Army's Cavalry as a sergeant during the mid to late 19th century. He is known for being one of only nineteen individuals to twice receive his nation's highest award for valor, the U.S. Medal of Honor.

The first medal, which was conveyed on April 27, 1872, while he was serving as a sergeant with the 4th Cavalry, was awarded for his bravery "in pursuit of a band of cattle thieves from New Mexico at Colorado Valley, Texas, March 28, 1872." While still a sergeant with the 4th Cavalry, he was then awarded his second medal September 29, 1872 for "distinguished conduct in action with Indians at Red River, Texas" during the previous day's Battle of the North Fork of the Red River.

== Formative years ==
Born in Philadelphia, Pennsylvania in 1847, William Wilson left the Keystone State as a young man to join the military. Mustering in with the U.S. Cavalry in October 1865, he subsequently participated in "all the Indian campaigns through Texas and the Sioux War of 1876."

== Early and mid-military career ==
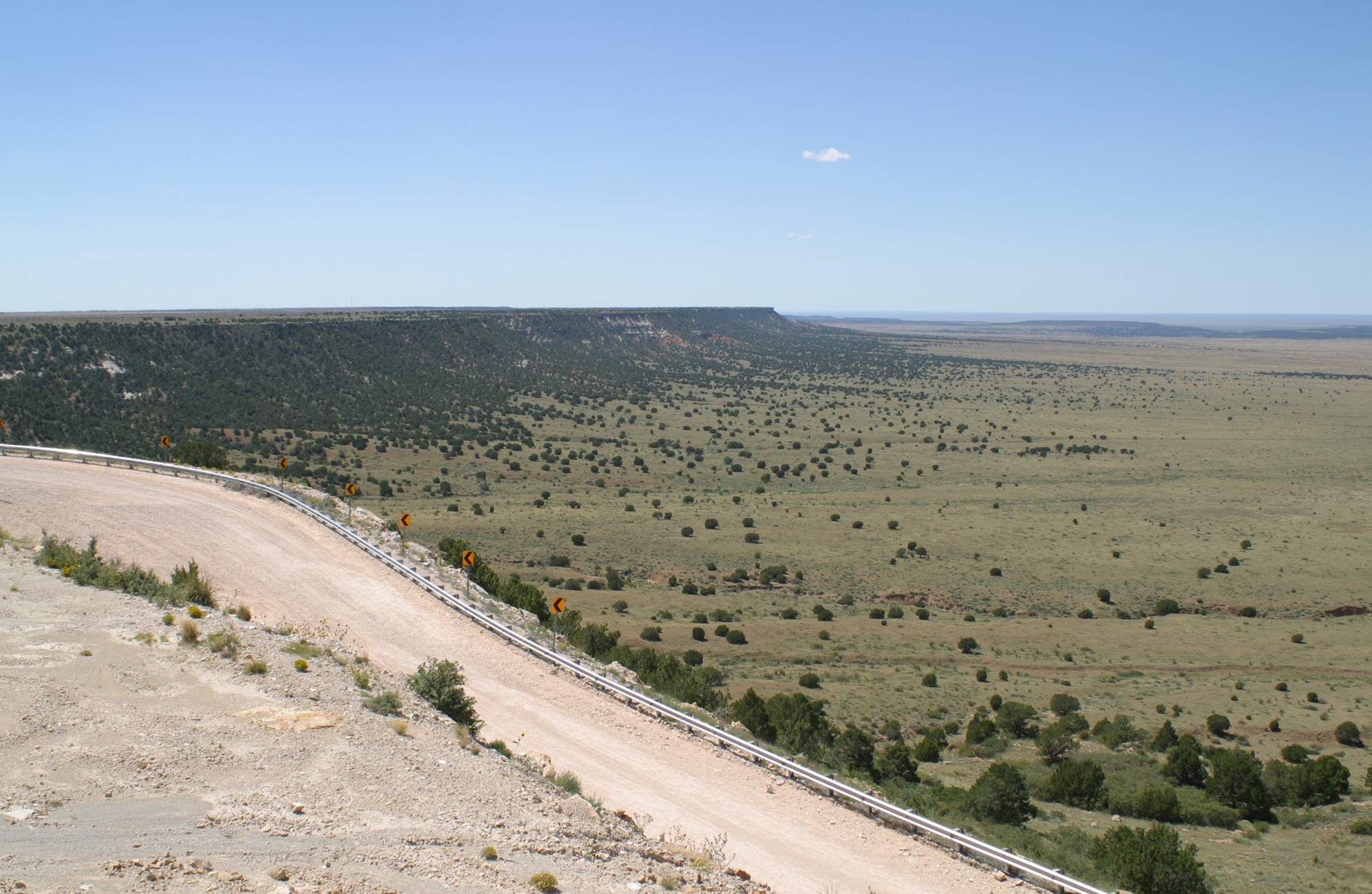
Northwest escarpment of the Llano Estacado (Staked Plains), Texas, 2003.

During the early 1870s, Wilson was initially stationed at Fort Sill, in Indian Territory (in what is now Oklahoma), and then at Fort Concho, a remote outpost in Texas near what is today, San Angelo, the latter of which was so small that it was staffed by less than two dozen horse soldiers. When Wilson and his fellow soldiers received word in March 1872 that a group of Comanche had stolen cattle during a raid on a farm near Fort Concho, he ordered a corporal and 20 privates to join him in responding. Catching up with the raiders near the Colorado River the next morning, after having ridden all night, he and his men killed four of the raiding party and captured a Mexican teenager who was traveling with them. After obtaining information from the boy regarding the raiders' activities and location, Wilson and his men were able to uncover a ring of Comancheros and New Mexico-based smugglers who had been supplying members of the Comanche tribe who were deemed hostile to the U.S. Government. With the U.S. Army's resulting success in resolving the situation at Colorado Valley, Texas on March 28, 1872, Sgt. Wilson was awarded his first U.S. Medal of Honor on April 27, 1872.

Interviewed in 1890 by a Washington newspaper, he recalled how the events had unfolded during that March 1872:

"In the year 1872 I was a sergeant in Troop I, Fourth Cavalry, stationed at Fort Concho, Tex., and was ordered with a detail of one corporal and ten privates in pursuit of a raiding party of Indians who had stolen stock in the neighborhood of the post. On the morning of March 11 I started. After striking their trail five miles from the post I followed it all day and the greater part of the night on a trot and gallop, halting thirty minutes in the afternoon to eat a lunch, camping at night on the trail in the mountains. In the morning we started again, the trail leading toward the Colorado River, and after traveling some time I turned in to the river for the purpose of cooking breakfast, sending one man on lookout. We had hardly got our cups on the fire before the lookout was observed coming into camp on a run. We immediately upset our water, put out the fire, and led the horses in. By this time the lookout had reported Indians a short way up the river. I mounted my detail and moved up in the direction indicated, and as we were about crossing a small stream leading into the main river we were greeted by a shot and then by a straggling volley. We charged their position, going through their camp, and, taking my position on a small eminence in their rear, I dismounted my men and went to work. In about two hours I had the entire outfit, burnt their saddles and camping outfit, capturing their stock and bringing in one prisoner, killing two, and wounding three, without the loss of a man or horse in my detachment. We returned to Fort Concho, where we arrived on the morning of the 13th, having ridden 120 miles in fifty-four hours. My conduct was brought to the notice of the Government, and I was awarded Medal No. 1. That prisoner I brought in was questioned, and gave information in relation to camps of Indians on the Staked Plains [Llano Estacado], and three columns were sent to operate against them."

Wilson then earned his second Medal of Honor six months later. Part of a larger U.S. Cavalry force led through Texas by Gen. Ranald S. Mackenzie, Wilson and his fellow soldiers came upon a very large Commanche settlement along the North Fork of the Red River. One village alone was reported to have been made up of between 260 and 280 lodges with as many as 500 male and 300 female inhabitants. At 4 p.m. on September 28, 1872, the U.S. cavalrymen charged, beginning the Battle of the North Fork of the Red River, but were initially repulsed by one of the villages. When Mackenzie realized that the initial engagement had rendered Wilson's immediate superior incapable of continuing, Mackenzie ordered Wilson to take charge of his unit and attack a second village. Fighting in and around that village until sunset, Wilson and his men killed more than 100 members of the tribe, burned the village, and seized 3,000 ponies plus the village's food and other supplies. Also taking 130 surviving tribe members captive (most of whom were women and children), Mackenzie and his men held them as prisoners at Fort Concho through the winter.

The day after the attack (September 29, 1872), Wilson was awarded his second Medal of Honor for "distinguished conduct in action with Indians at Red River, Texas." He was also recognized by the U.S. Army later that fall via General Orders:

"THE ARMY. WAR DEPARTMENT.
W. W. Belknap, Secretary of War.
ADJUTANT-GENERAL'S OFFICE. Brigadier-General E. W. Townsend, Adjutant-General.

HEADQUARTERS OF THE ARMY, ADJUTANT-GENERAL'S OFFICE,
WASHINGTON, D.C., Nov. 19, 1872.
General Orders No. 99.

Reports have been received of an engagement with hostile Indians on the 29th of September, 1872, on the north fork of the Red river, near the mouth of McClellan's creek, Texas, by the expedition under the command of Colonel R. S. McKenzie, Fourth Cavalry. The following named officers are specially mentioned for gallant conduct: Major A. E. Lattimer, Fourth Cavalry; Captain John Lee, Fourth Cavalry; Captain Wirt Davis, Fourth Cavalry [et al.]. Acting assistant surgeon Rufus Choate is commended for his care of the wounded under fire.

On recommendation of the General of the Army the Secretary of War has awarded medals of honor to the following enlisted men reported as specially distinguished in the engagement: Corporal Henry A. McMasters, Company A, Fourth Cavalry; First Sergeant William McNamara, Company F, Fourth Cavalry; Sergeant William Foster, Company F, Fourth Cavalry; Farrier David Larkin, Company F, Fourth Cavalry; Private William Rankin, Company F, Fourth Cavalry; Private Edward Branegan, Company F, Fourth Cavalry; Sergeant William Wilson, Company I, Fourth Cavalry; Corporal William O'Neil, Company I, Fourth Cavalry; Blacksmith James Pratt, Company I, Fourth Cavalry.

By command of General Sherman.

E. D. TOWNSEND, Adjutant-General.

Mackenzie and his men, however, were later accused by Clinton Smith, one of the Comanche survivors, of having committed a massacre that day.

== Post-war career ==
Sometime during the late 1870s, Wilson took a brief break from military life to return to Philadelphia, where he worked as a railway superintendent, but after five years, he returned to active military duty, officially resuming his service in 1882.

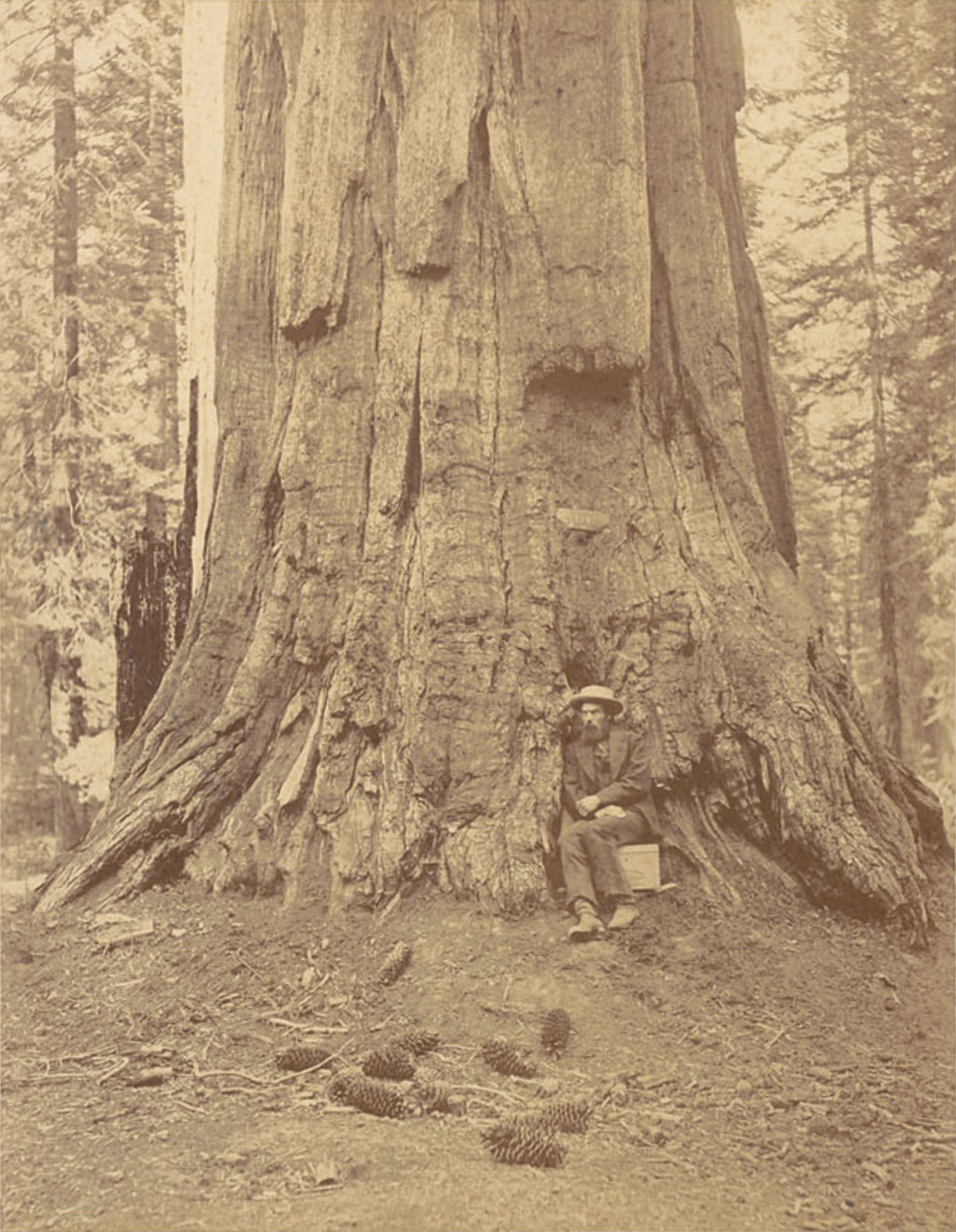
More than two decades before Sgt. William Wilson guarded General Grant Park (in 1894), photographer Eadweard Muybridge was sheltered by that grove's General Grant Tree (in 1872). Still standing as of 2019, the tree is the world's third oldest.

A sergeant with the U.S. 4th Cavalry's B Troop during the early 1890s, Wilson filed reports documenting his summer 1894 supervision of national park land patrols. On July 22, 1894, he wrote to the acting superintendent of Sequoia National Park:

"CAMP IN GENERAL GRANT PARK, July 22, 1894.

I left camp near Carter's ranch June 20 with a detail of 3 privates and 1 wagon with supplies en route to General Grant Park; marched to Auckland's post-office, 28 miles, arriving at 4 p.m. Roads good, no grass, water in creek.

June 21. Left Auckland at 5:30 a.m., marched to Old Comstock Mills, 22 miles, arriving at 3 p.m. Steep mountain road, no grass, plenty of wood, and good water.

June 22. Left camp at Comstock Mills at 5:15 a.m., marched to park, 10 miles, arriving at 10:30 a.m.; delay caused by unloading wagon at Stevens Grade. Plenty of wood, water, and grass. Found that sheep had been in the park but had left and drive over to the Kings River.

June 23. Entered on my duties as guard to the park by sending out my patrols, which had been continued ever since.

We have had no trouble with cattle this year so far, having found but 3 head in the park, and upon chasing them they left and have not returned. There are no sheep in the neighborhood of the park. We have visitors in the park daily. On the 4th of July we had quite a large picnic here from Sequoia Mills. I had my detail present to enforce the rules; no damage done.

I have no breach of discipline to report. The men have performed their duties in a soldierly manner. The men and horses are in good health and condition.

I have on hand rations to include August 31 for the men, and barley to include October 10 for the horses.

Very respectfully, your obedient servant,
WILLIAM WILSON, Sergeant Troop B, Fourth Cavalry, in charge of detail.

ACTING SUPERINTENDENT SEQUOIA NATIONAL PARK"

Wilson spent the remaining years of his career stationed at the Presidio in San Francisco.

== Illness, death and interment ==
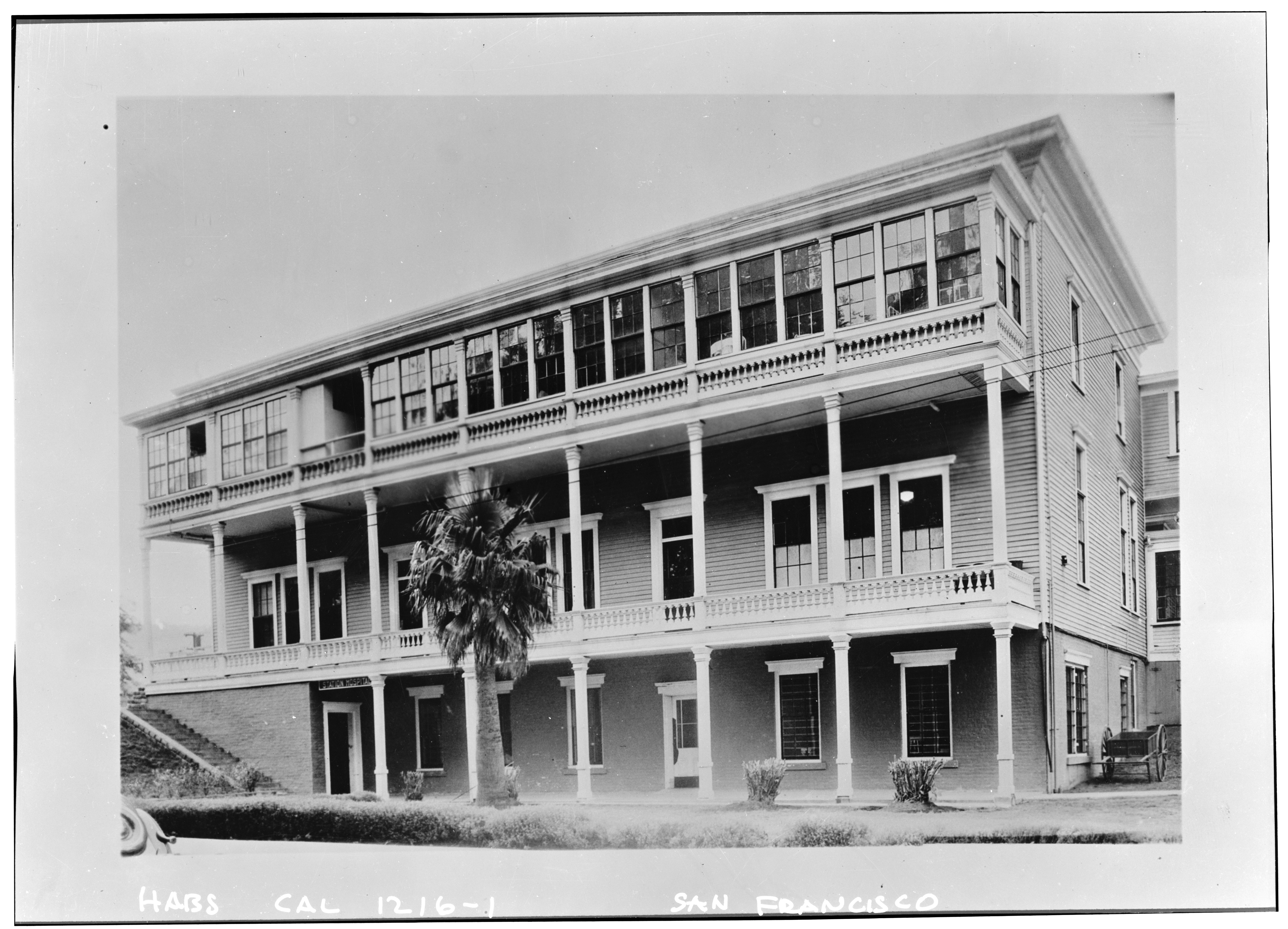
Wright Army Hospital (c. 1930s), the Presidio's hospital at the time of Sgt. William Wilson's illness.

Diagnosed with stomach cancer in November 1895, Wilson's health quickly declined. Six weeks later, after shaking hands with each member of his cavalry unit on Sunday, December 22, 1895, he died at 12:30 p.m. that afternoon at the age of 48. A member of the Grand Army of the Republic, he had also been a member of the Army and Navy Union and of the Medal of Honor Legion, and had had only one year to serve until becoming eligible for retirement at three-quarters pay.

His funeral was held on the morning of Christmas Eve, Tuesday, December 24, 1895. Following services which began at 10:30 a.m. at the Presidio's Post Hospital, he was buried with military honors at San Francisco National Cemetery (Section WS, Site 527).

== Medal of Honor citations ==
First citation:

At Colorado Valley, Texas, March 28, 1872. Date of issue: April 27, 1872. In pursuit of a band of cattle thieves from New Mexico.

Second citation:

Distinguished conduct in action with Indians. Awarded: At Red River, Texas, September 29, 1872.

== See also ==
- List of Medal of Honor recipients
- List of Medal of Honor recipients for the Indian Wars
- William Othello Wilson, a Buffalo soldier with the same first and last names, who also received the Medal of Honor.
