= Battle of Blanco Canyon =

1871 United States battle against Comanches

- Part of the Comanche Campaign
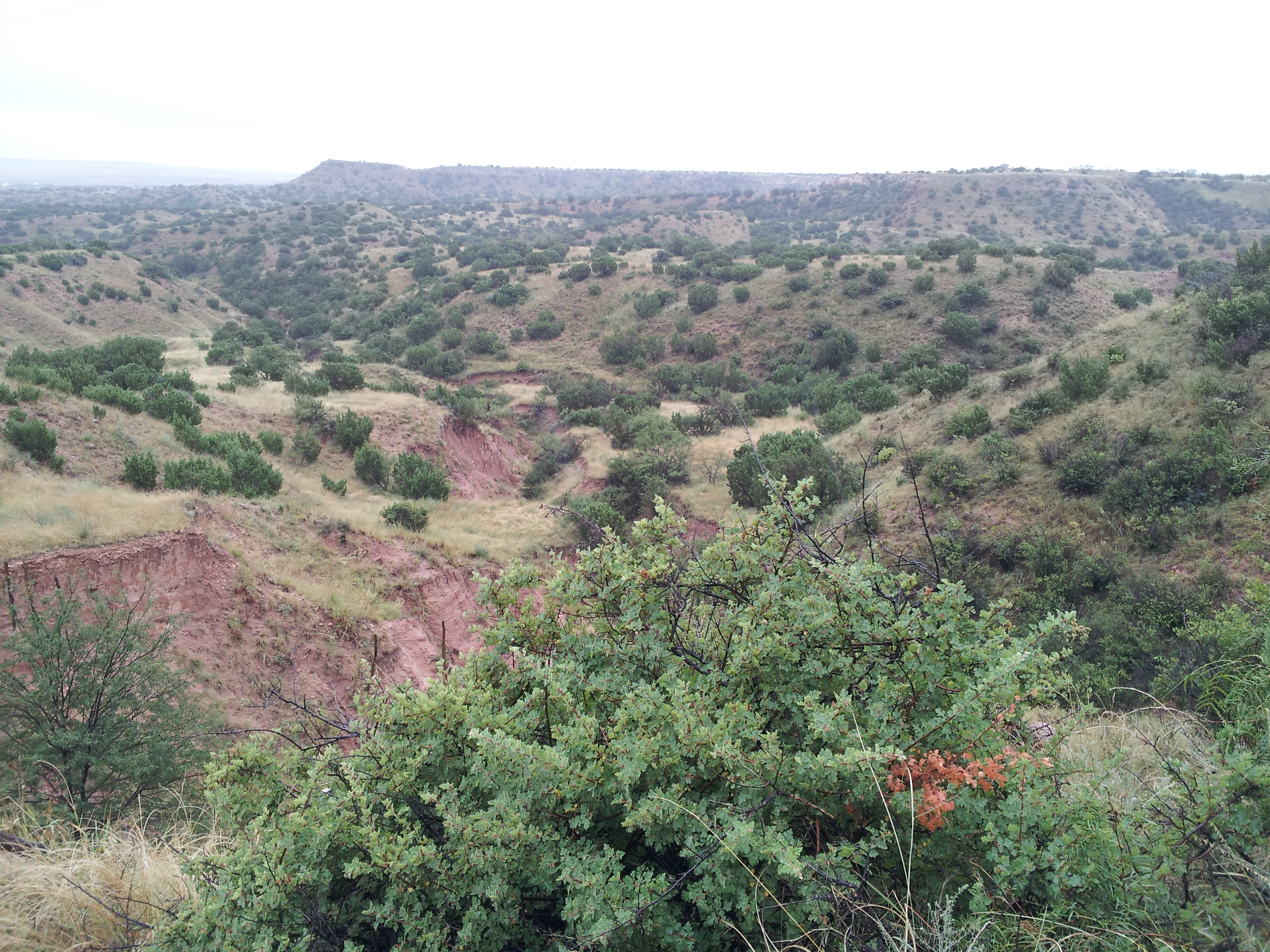
- Blanco Canyon, seen from the west rim, on Highway 82
Date	October 10, 1871
Location	Near Blanco Canyon, Texas 33°39′52″N 101°10′32″W
Result	Inconclusive, Comanche village escapes capture

Belligerents
United States; 4th Cavalry Regiment (United States), Tonkawa scouts	Comanche Kotsoteka and Quahadi Band

Commanders and leaders
Ranald S. Mackenzie (WIA); Clarence Mauck	Quannah Parker

Strength
600 men, including 20 Tonkawas	300–400

Casualties and losses
1 dead, 2 reported wounded, including Col. Mackenzie.	5
- Location within Texas

The Battle of Blanco Canyon was the decisive battle of Col. Ranald S. Mackenzie's initial campaign against the Comanche in West Texas and marked the first time the Comanches had been attacked in the heart of their homeland. It was also the first time a large military force explored the heart of Comancheria. On 12 August 1871 Mackenzie and Colonel Benjamin Grierson were asked by Indian Agent Lawrie Tatum to begin an expedition against the Kotsoteka and Quahadi Comanche bands, both of whom had refused to relocate to a reservation after the Warren Wagon Train Raid. Col. Mackenzie assembled a powerful force consisting of eight companies of the Fourth United States Cavalry, two companies of the Eleventh Infantry, and a group of twenty Tonkawa scouts.

== Onset of the Campaign ==
The force assembled at the site of old Camp Cooper, on the Clear Fork of the Brazos River on 19 September 1871. The force set out in a northwesterly direction on 30 September 1871, hoping to find the Quahadi village, which housed the warriors led by Quanah Parker. This village was believed to be encamped in Blanco Canyon near the headwaters of the Freshwater Fork of the Brazos River, southeast of the site of present Crosbyton, Texas. On the fourth night of the march, the expedition established a base camp at the junction of the Salt Fork of the Brazos and Duck Creek, near the site of present Spur, Texas. The following day, Col. Mackenzie decided to leave his infantry to fortify the base camp, and set out for Blanco Canyon with his cavalry, hoping to catch the Comanche by surprise, and strike a blow at them in their heartland.

In the afternoon of October 9, 1871, the cavalry force reached the White River and Blanco Canyon, the first non-Comanche military force to enter Blanco Canyon since the rise of the Comanche as a power on the plains. Near midnight, Quanah Parker personally led a small Comanche force which stampeded through the cavalry camp, driving off about seventy horses and mules. As the pursuing cavalry reached the top of a hill on the top of the canyon, they found a much larger party of Indians, who were waiting in ambush. The cavalry fought their way clear, but suffered the loss of one cavalryman, the sole Army fatality of the entire campaign. Lt. Robert Goldthwaite Carter and a detail of five men mounted a rear guard action against the Comanches, and the remainder of the unit retreated. This action on 10 October 1871, won Lt. Carter the Medal of Honor.

Mackenzie's main column and the Tonkawa scouts, hearing the gunfire, advanced and probably saved the detachment from slaughter, as more Comanche had managed to surround the retreating unit. With the arrival of the main cavalry column, Quanah Parker and his warriors retreated. The Comanches fought their way up the walls of Blanco Canyon, sniping at the oncoming troopers and taunting their Tonkawa enemies before disappearing from the Army's sight as they went over the Caprock Escarpment, and onto the Llano Estacado, Carter lacerating his leg against a boulder in the process.

== Second Phase of the Expedition ==
Col. Mackenzie pursued the Indians over the next few days, forcing them to abandon lodge poles, buffalo hides, tools, and most of their possessions as they fled. These were the necessities of life for the Comanche, and meant the coming winter would be unusually bleak, without shelter or accumulated food. The Army was able to catch up with the fleeing warriors, slowed by their families, in the late afternoon of October 12, 1871. Mackenzie was unable to attack them due to the arrival of an unseasonable "blue norther", (a winter storm from the Great Plains). High winds, blinding snow, hail and sleet halted the cavalry advance, and allowed the Comanche to again retreat safely. The cavalry force continued the pursuit the following morning, but the weather and conditions allowed the Comanche to disappear into the storm. Mackenzie ordered his troops to follow what the scouts believed was the Comanche trail for about forty miles, nearly to the vicinity of present-day Plainview, Texas. Given the deteriorating state of his men and horses, and low rations, Mackenzie reluctantly turned back.

== Re-Entering Blanco Canyon ==
On October 15, 1871, the cavalry re-entered Blanco Canyon and Army scouts saw two Comanches spying on the troops on the walls of the Canyon. In the brief fight that followed their discovery, the two Comanches were killed, while Mackenzie and another soldier were wounded. Despite his wound, Mackenzie continued with the command to the mouth of Blanco Canyon, where they rested for a week awaiting supplies from Henry Ware Lawton. On October 24, 1871, Mackenzie decided to continue the campaign, and began moving towards the headwaters of the Pease River. However, Mackenzie's wound became too painful and he placed Major Clarence Mauck in command, remaining back with the other disabled and dismounted troops at Duck Creek. On November 6, in the midst of a snow storm, Major Mauck's expedition returned to the camp at Duck Creek. On November 12, 1871, Mackenzie's force returned to Fort Griffin, ending the campaign at Fort Richardson on 17 Nov.

== Result of the Expedition ==
Col. Mackenzie regarded the entire expedition as unsuccessful. The command had marched 509 miles, and lost one man and many horses. He considered that they had accomplished nothing but frighten one hostile Comanche band. However, he had marched to the heart of the Comancheria (and mapped the region in the process), penetrated an area of the Llano Estacado no Americans except Comancheros had ever seen, destroyed the winter equipment of the Comanche he encountered, and temporarily driven them from their homeland. The lessons he learned about Plains Indian warfare as a result of the battle of Blanco Canyon and this expedition informed his plans and actions during the Red River War, and resulted a few years later in the surrender of the last free Comanche.

== See also ==
- Battle of Palo Duro Canyon
