= William Othello Wilson =

United States Army Medal of Honor recipient (1869–1928)

- Born: September 16, 1869; Hagerstown, Maryland, US
- Died: January 18, 1928 (aged 58)
- Military career
- Branch: United States Army
- Service years: 1889–1893
- Rank: Corporal
- Units: Company I, 9th U.S. Cavalry
- Conflicts: Indian Wars
- Awards: Medal of Honor
- Other work: Upholsterer; Cook; Carpenter

William Othello Wilson (September 16, 1869 – January 18, 1928) was an African-American corporal in the United States Army's 9th Cavalry Regiment. He is noted for having received the Medal of Honor.

== Army service ==
Wilson joined the Army from Saint Paul, Minnesota in August 1889. By December 1890 he was a corporal and one of the best marksmen in his unit. He was known for wearing a black leather coat and a broad-rimmed white hat.

Wilson's unit was involved with patrol duties during the Ghost Dance War with the Sioux. The day after the Wounded Knee Massacre, with D Troop and a supply train of wagons surrounded by about fifty Sioux warriors in the early morning of December 30, 1890, Wilson volunteered to carry a message to the Indian agency of the Pine Ridge Reservation two miles away after the Indian scouts refused. After leaving the wagon circle, he was pursued by the warriors but outran them and alerted the other troops at the agency to rescue the stranded soldiers. He earned the Medal of Honor on December 30, 1891, for bravery in volunteering to successfully carry a message to the Pine Ridge Indian Agency in South Dakota.

The 9th cavalry remained at the Pine Ridge reservation until the end of March 1891, lodging in their tents. Just a few weeks before the 9th Cavalry left the Pine Ridge reservation, Wilson took an unauthorized trip to Chadron, Nebraska and was accused of desertion. Wilson denied the charge and said he was under the influence of alcohol, and also blamed the overwintering stress at the Pine Ridge reservation. He spent a week in the guardhouse of Fort Robinson before his comrades from the 9th Cavalry left their winter lodgings through a blizzard to reach a barracks.

In 1893, during a trip to represent his regiment in an annual marksmanship contest in Nebraska, he did not return to his regiment. He kept his Springfield carbine and Colt revolver and the Army did not pursue him.

Wilson was the only black soldier to earn a Medal of Honor after desertion. Wilson was also last black soldier to earn the Medal of Honor for heroism on American soil.

== Medal of Honor citation ==
Rank and organization: Corporal, Company I, 9th U.S. Cavalry. Place and date: Sioux Campaign, 1890. Entered service at: St. Paul, Minn. Birth: Hagerstown, Md. Date of issue: September 17, 1891.

Citation:

Bravery.

A more detailed citation was published in General Order 100, on December 17, 1891:

December 30, 1890. Private (then Corporal) William O. Wilson, Troop I, 9th Cavalry: For gallantry in carrying a message for assistance through country occupied by the enemy, when the wagon train under escort of Captain Loud was attacked by hostile Sioux Indians, near the Pine Ridge Agency, South Dakota.

== Later life and death ==
After desertion in 1893, Wilson returned to civilian life in Maryland, working as an upholsterer, a cook, and a carpenter; he married and had seven children. Wilson died on January 18, 1928.

== Legacy ==
In February 2003, Wilson's only surviving daughter, Anna V. Jones, donated her father's medal to the then new Maryland African American Museum Corporation.

== See also ==
- List of Medal of Honor recipients
- List of Medal of Honor recipients for the Indian Wars
- William Wilson (soldier, born 1847), a two-time recipient of the Medal of Honor, with the same first and last name.
