= Henry A. McMasters =

United States Army Medal of Honor recipient

- Born: c. 1848; Augusta, Maine
- Died: November 11, 1872 (aged 23–24)
- Burial place: San Antonio National Cemetery, San Antonio, Texas
- Military career
- Allegiance: United States of America
- Branch: United States Army
- Rank: Corporal
- Units: Company A, 4th Cavalry Regiment
- Conflicts: Indian Wars; Battle of the North Fork of the Red River
- Awards: - Medal of Honor

Henry A. McMasters (c. 1848 – November 11, 1872) was a United States Army Corporal during the Indian Wars who received the Medal of Honor on November 19, 1872, for service at Red River, Texas on September 29, 1872 in combat with the Kotsoteka band of the Comanche.

== Medal of Honor citation ==
Citation:

Gallantry in action.

== See also ==
- List of Medal of Honor recipients
