= Battle of Palo Duro Canyon =

Attack on Plains Indians in Texas, US

- Part of the Red River War, American Indian Wars
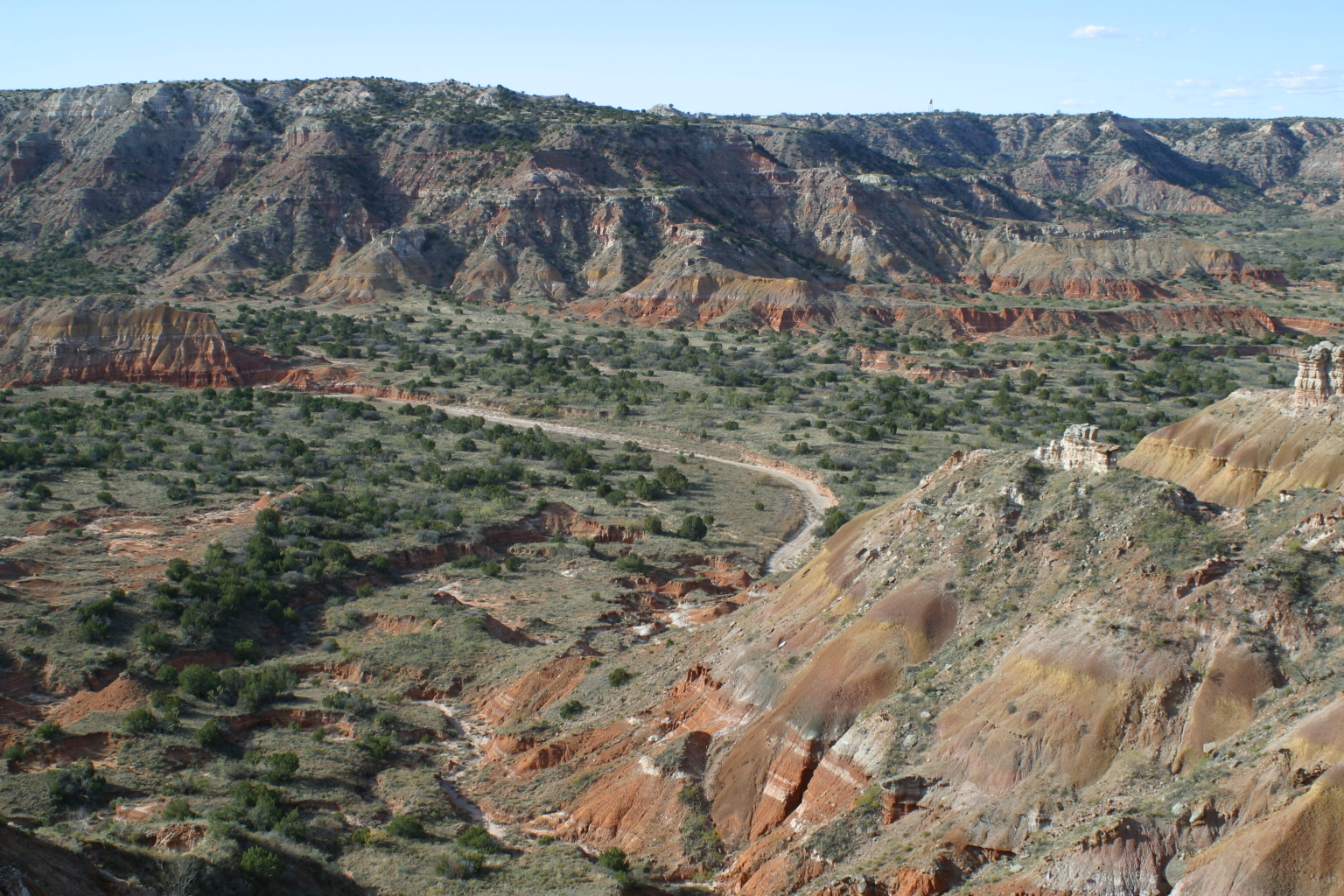
- Palo Duro Canyon
Date	September 28, 1874
Location	Palo Duro Canyon, Texas 34°52′40″N 101°36′20″W
Result	United States victory

Belligerents
United States; Tonkawa	Cheyenne; Comanche; Kiowa

Commanders and leaders
Ranald S. Mackenzie	Poor Buffalo; Lone Wolf

Strength
400 cavalry	1,500 warriors

Casualties and losses
1 wounded	15 killed at Tule; 50–60 killed at Palo Duro
- Location within Texas

The Battle of Palo Duro Canyon was a military confrontation and a significant United States victory during the Red River War. The battle occurred on September 28, 1874, when several U.S. Army companies under Ranald S. Mackenzie attacked a large encampment of Plains Indians in Palo Duro Canyon in the Texas Panhandle.

== Background ==
Late in the summer of 1874, Quahada Comanche, Southern Cheyenne, Arapaho and Kiowa warriors led by Lone Wolf left their assigned reservations and sought refuge in Palo Duro Canyon in the Texas Panhandle. There they had been stockpiling food and supplies for the winter. Colonel Ranald S. Mackenzie, leading the 4th U.S. Cavalry, departed Fort Clark, Texas on August 15, reached Fort Concho on the 21st and the mouth of Blanco Canyon on the 23rd with eight companies plus three from the 10th Infantry and one from the 11th Infantry. Mackenzie's orders from General Christopher C. Augur stated he was "at liberty to follow the Indians wherever they go, even to the Agencies."

Mackenzie formed three columns, the first column consisting of eight companies of the 4th Cavalry and two infantry companies, the second column under Lt. Col. George P. Buell consisting of five companies of the 9th Cavalry, one from the 10th Cavalry, and two infantry companies, and the third column under Lt. Col. John W. Davidson consisting of eight companies of the 10th Cavalry and two infantry companies. The first column moved north along the edge of the Staked Plains, the second advanced up the Red River and the third marched from Fort Sill. By September 25, Indians began to gather around Mackenzie's troops so that on the night of September 26–27, they were attacked near Tule Canyon and Boehm's Canyon, resulting in the deaths of 15 warriors including the Kiowa chief Woman Heart.

Early in September, Tonkawa and Black Seminole Scouts in advance of the 4th Cavalry were ambushed by Comanche near the Staked Plains and escaped with their lives. The scouts relayed and alerted the Comanche position to Mackenzie.

== The battle ==
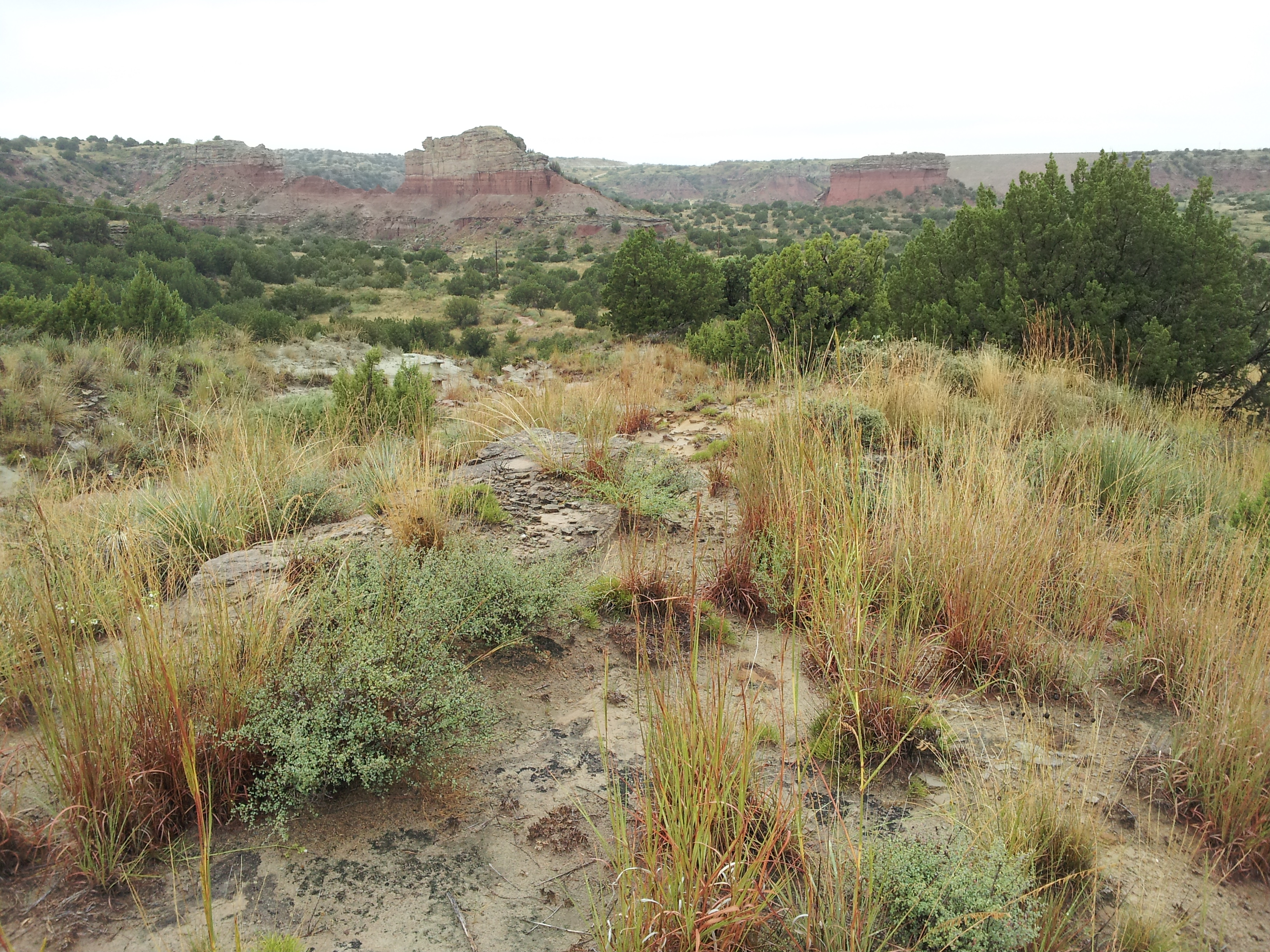
Tule Canyon as seen from Highway 207 north of Silverton, Texas

Early on the morning of September 28, two of Mackenzie's Tonkawa scouts found a "fresh trail" and Mackenzie resumed the march, reaching a "wide and yawning chasm" at dawn, where they could see the Indian lodges. Mackenzie's cavalry dismounted and led their horses single-file along a narrow zig-zag path.

Mackenzie first hit Chief Lone Wolf's Kiowa camp and routed it. Chiefs Poor Buffalo and Lone Wolf and the Indians managed to get away, leaving behind their possessions and horses, climbing up both sides of the canyon. The Indian warriors began firing on the troops from 800 to 1000 feet above, making "it so hot", it prompted one to say, "How will we ever get out of here", to which Mackenzie stated, "I brought you in, I will take you out". Part of the command started a retreat up the "precipitous cliffs" from which they had descended while others pulled down the lodges, chopped up the lodge poles, and burned all of the Indian belongings in huge bonfires. Almost 2000 horses were captured and moved from the canyon with the remaining troops by 4 PM. Mackenzie's troops made it back to their supply camp in Tule Canyon on the morning of the 29th.

== Results ==
The loss of the Palo Duro camp meant the loss of the Indians' safe haven and all of their winter supplies. Some horses fled with the Indians onto the plains but Mackenzie was able to capture 1,500–2,000 ponies, which he slaughtered to prevent them from falling into the hands of the Indians. Casualties were light in the engagement since it had been a complete rout, but without sufficient mounts or supplies the tribes could not hold out over the winter and many returned to the Fort Sill reservation by November 1874; Lone Wolf's Kiowas did not return until February 1875. The battle marked the final major engagement of the Red River War and was one of the last battles of the Texas-Indian Wars. Col. R. S. Mackenzie recommended seven soldiers of the 4th U.S. Cavalry and Adam Payne of the Black Seminole Scouts for the Medal of Honor.

== See also ==
- Battle of Blanco Canyon
- Prairie Dog Town Fork Red River
- Llano Estacado
- Caprock Escarpment
