= Ranald S. Mackenzie =

Union army general (1840–1889)

Ranald Slidell Mackenzie
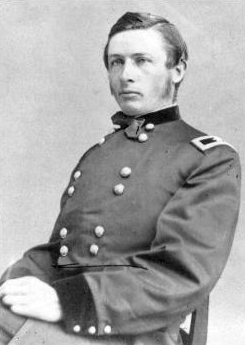
- Born: July 27, 1840; Westchester County, New York, U.S.
- Died: January 19, 1889 (aged 48); Staten Island, New York, U.S.
- Burial place: West Point Cemetery
- Alma mater: United States Military Academy
- Relatives: John Slidell (uncle); Alexander Slidell Mackenzie (father); Alexander Slidell MacKenzie (brother)
- Military career
- Allegiance: United States; Union
- Branch: United States Army; Union Army
- Service years: 1862–1884
- Rank: Brigadier General; Brevet Major General
- Nicknames: "Bad Hand", "No-Finger Chief", "Three-Finger Jack"
- Commands: 2nd Connecticut Heavy Artillery; 41st U.S. Infantry; 24th U.S. Infantry; 4th U.S. Cavalry
- Conflicts: American Civil War; Battle of Second Bull Run; Battle of Antietam; Battle of Gettysburg; Overland Campaign; Second Battle of Petersburg; Battle of Cedar Creek; Battle of Five Forks; Battle of Appomattox Courthouse; American Indian Wars; Battle of Blanco Canyon; Battle of the North Fork; Remolino Raid; Red River War; Battle of Palo Duro Canyon; Dull Knife Fight

Ranald Slidell Mackenzie, also called Bad Hand, (July 27, 1840 – January 19, 1889) was a career United States Army officer and general in the Union Army during the American Civil War. He was described by General Ulysses S. Grant as its most promising young officer. He also served with great distinction in the following Indian Wars.

== Early life and education ==
Mackenzie was born in Westchester County, New York, to Commodore Alexander Slidell Mackenzie and Catherine Alexander Robinson. He was the nephew of diplomat and politician John Slidell and the older brother of two United States Navy officers: Rear Admiral Morris Robinson Slidell Mackenzie and Lieutenant Commander Alexander Slidell MacKenzie. His grandfather was John Slidell, a bank president and a political power broker in New York City.

He initially attended Williams College, where he was a member of the Kappa Alpha Society, and then accepted an appointment to the United States Military Academy, where he graduated at the head of his class in 1862. He immediately joined the Union forces already fighting in the Civil War.

== Civil War military career ==
Commissioned a second lieutenant in the Corps of Engineers, Mackenzie served in the battles of Second Bull Run, Antietam, Gettysburg, and through the Overland Campaign and Petersburg in 1864. He was wounded at Bull Run, Gettysburg and Jerusalem Plank Road. His wounding at Jerusalem Plank Road during the siege of Petersburg cost him the first two fingers of his right hand and was the probable cause for his nickname, "Bad Hand". By June 1864, he had been brevetted to lieutenant colonel in the Regular Army due to bravery.

In July 1864, he was appointed colonel of the 2nd Connecticut Heavy Artillery. He moved with the VI Corps when it opposed Early's Washington Raid at the battle of Fort Stevens. He was again wounded at Opequon. He was given command of the 2nd Brigade, 1st Division, VI Corps and was again wounded at the Battle of Cedar Creek. Upon his recovery, on November 30, 1864, President Abraham Lincoln appointed Mackenzie brigadier general of volunteers, to rank from October 19, 1864. The President submitted the nomination to the U.S. Senate on December 12, 1864, and the Senate confirmed the appointment on February 14, 1865. After his appointment, Mackenzie assumed command of the Cavalry Division in the Army of the James, which he led at the battles of Five Forks and Appomattox Courthouse. Ulysses S. Grant wrote in his memoir that MacKenzie led an army corps at the very end of the battles to capture Lee's army. He wrote, "Griffin, Humphreys, and Mackenzie were good corps commanders, but came into that position so near to the close of the war as not to attract public attention. All three served as such, in the last campaign of the armies of the Potomac and the James, which culminated at Appomattox Court House, on the 9th of April, 1865. The sudden collapse of the rebellion monopolized attention to the exclusion of almost everything else. I regarded Mackenzie as the most promising young officer in the army. Graduating at West Point, as he did, during the second year of the war, he had won his way up to the command of a corps before its close. This he did upon his own merit and without influence."

Mackenzie was mustered out of the volunteer service on January 15, 1866. On January 13, 1866, President Andrew Johnson appointed Mackenzie to the brevet grade of major general of volunteers, to rank from March 31, 1865, for services in the Shenandoah Valley campaign and the U.S. Senate confirmed the appointment on March 12, 1866. Mackenzie was known for his harsh discipline and was not well liked by troops serving under him, who called him the "Perpetual Punisher". However, he was respected by his peers and superiors for his skill and abilities. He had been wounded six times and received seven brevets.

== Service in the Indian Wars ==
After the Civil War, Mackenzie remained in the regular army and reverted to his permanent rank of captain in the Army Corps of Engineers. Appointed colonel of the 41st U.S. Infantry (later 24th U.S. Infantry, one of the Buffalo Soldier regiments) in 1867, Mackenzie spent the rest of his career on the Frontier. Some officers were reluctant to lead African-American regiments, but Mackenzie did well with the 41st. On February 25, 1871, he assumed command of the 4th U.S. Cavalry at Fort Richardson in Jacksboro, Texas. He led the regiment in the Battle of Blanco Canyon and at the Battle of the North Fork in the Llano Estacado of West Texas. In October 1871, he was wounded a seventh time by an arrow in the leg. At Fort Clark he led a punitive raid against the Indians operating out of Mexico.

Mackenzie fought in the Red River War, routing a combined Indian force at the Battle of Palo Duro Canyon far to the north from his headquarters at Fort Concho in San Angelo, Texas. In 1876, he defeated the Cheyenne in the Dull Knife Fight, which helped bring about the end of the Black Hills War. This led to his appointment as commander of the District of New Mexico in 1881. In 1882, he was appointed brigadier general and assigned to the Department of Texas (October 30, 1883). He bought a Texas ranch and was engaged to be married; however, he began to demonstrate odd behavior which was attributed to a fall from a wagon at Fort Sill, Oklahoma, in which he injured his head. Showing signs of mental instability, he was retired from the Army on March 24, 1884, for "general paresis of the insane".

Mackenzie died at his sister's home in New Brighton, Staten Island, New York, and is buried in West Point National Cemetery. The New York Times, which had once followed and reported upon his career so closely over the years, printed only a short notice at his death. However, the Army and Navy Journal carried a lengthy article on his career and personal life, which began, "The sorrow with which the Army will learn of the death of the once brilliant Ranald Slidell MacKenzie derives an additional pang from the recollection of the cloud which overshadowed his later years and consigned him to a living death."

== Biography ==
In 1964, the Texas historian Ernest Wallace published Ranald S. Mackenzie and the Texas Frontier, a definitive study of the officer. Wallace also wrote the historical article "Colonel Ranald S. Mackenzie's Expedition Across the South Plains" in Volume 38 of the West Texas Historical Association Year Book.

== Memorials ==
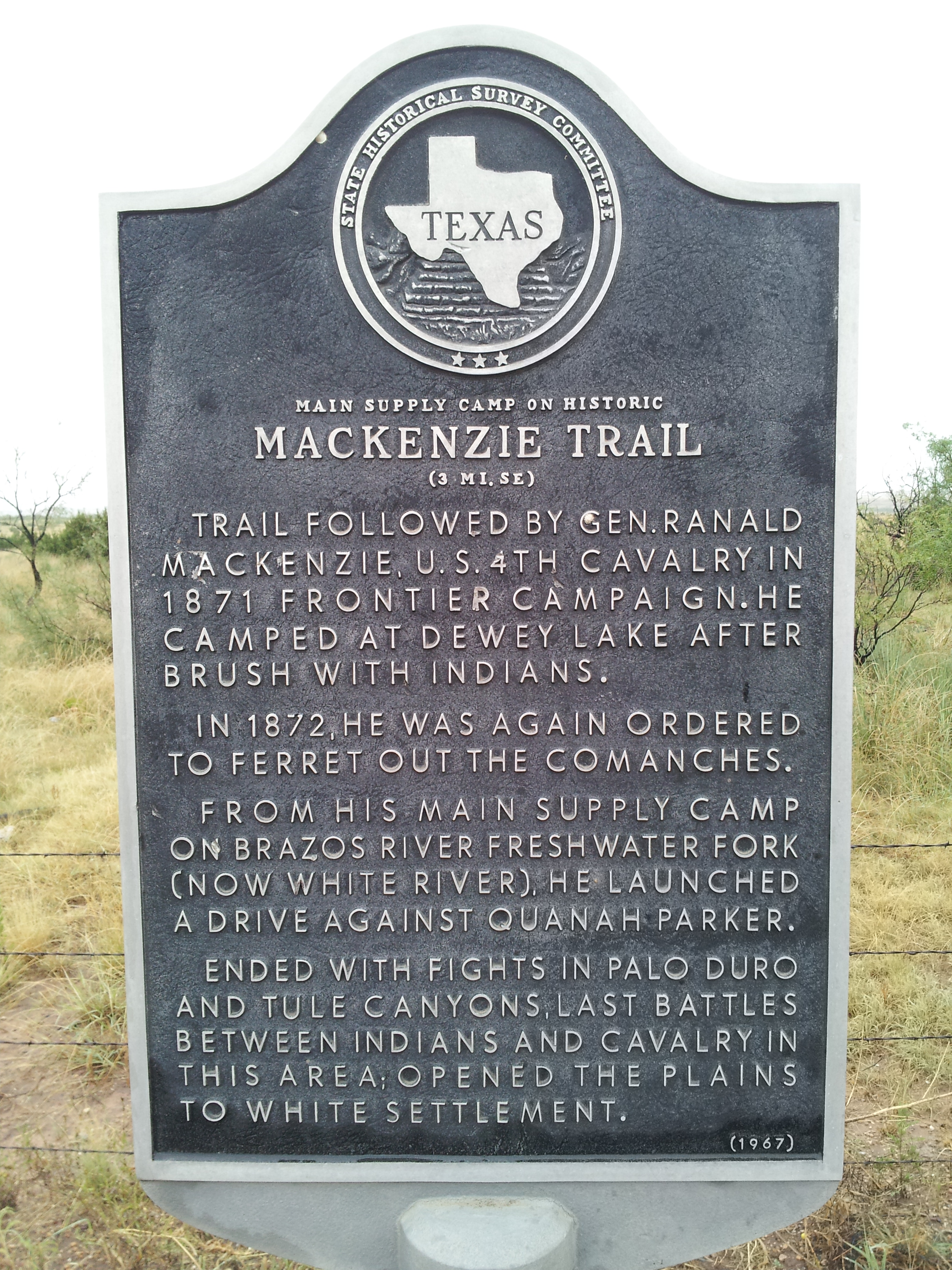
Texas Historical Marker on Highway 82 in Blanco Canyon for the Mackenzie Trail

- Fort Mackenzie (Military post: 1899–1918, VA Hospital 1922–Present) located at Sheridan, Wyoming was named for General Mackenzie. Opened in 1899, after 1913 the fort was largely unused, and in 1918 it was abandoned by the military, but it was transferred to the Bureau of Health and opened as a mental health hospital starting in 1922 for veterans of World War I. It has continued as a VA hospital for mentally ill patients to the present.
- Fort Mackenzie High School is an alternative education high school in Sheridan. The name comes from the VA Hospital nearby, which was, as noted, originally a military fort named for General Mackenzie.
- Mackenzie Road is a major transportation artery aboard the Fort Sill training area.
- There is a Fort Mackenzie Lane in Laramie, Wyoming.
- During Operation Iraqi Freedom, Forward Operating Base MacKenzie, a FOB was named for him.
- Mackenzie Park in Lubbock, Texas is named for General Mackenzie.
- Mackenzie Middle School in Lubbock, Texas.
- Lake Mackenzie in Tule Canyon, near his base camp (1874) in Briscoe County, Texas, is named for him.

== In popular culture ==
The 1950 John Ford film Rio Grande contains some similarities to Mackenzie's action on the frontier.

The 1958–1959 syndicated television series, Mackenzie's Raiders, starring Richard Carlson in the title role, is loosely based on Mackenzie's time at the former Fort Clark near Brackettville, Texas.

== See also ==
- List of American Civil War generals (Union)
