= Operation Shenandoah =

Part of the Vietnam War (1966)

- Part of the Vietnam War
Date	16 October – 2 November 1966
Location	Bình Long Province (now Bình Phước Province), South Vietnam 10.9°N 106.8°E
Result	U.S. victory

Belligerents
United States	Viet Cong

Commanders and leaders
BG William E. DePuy; Col. Sidney Berry	Senior Col. Hoàng Cầm

Units involved
1st Brigade, 1st Infantry Division	9th Division: 272nd Regiment

Casualties and losses
5 killed	74 killed

Operation Shenandoah was an operation conducted by 1st Brigade, 1st Infantry Division in Bình Long Province, lasting from 16 October to 2 November 1966.

== Prelude ==
Following the conclusion of Operation Tulsa, BG William E. DePuy kept Col. Sidney Berry's 1st Brigade in the field hoping to repeat the success of the Battle of Minh Thanh Road by establishing firebases in the area and then sending convoys along Highway 13 and the Minh Thanh Road to invite attack by the Viet Cong (VC).

== Operation ==
From 18 October 1st Brigade sent units from its base at Quản Lợi Base Camp along Highway 13 to Lộc Ninh, this did not provoke any response from the VC. From 24 October patrols were sent southwest onto the Minh Thanh Road but the VC also ignored these. From 25 to 26 October the Brigade searched the Minh Thanh Plantation without success.

On 28 October patrols encountered a VC force and Col. Berry ordered the 1st Battalion, 26th Infantry Regiment (1/26th Infantry) and the 1st Battalion, 28th Infantry Regiment (1/28th Infantry) to search the area. A platoon from the 1/26th Infantry ambushed a VC unit and Col. Berry decided to surround it by airlifting the 2/28th Infantry to the west of the scene while the 2nd Battalion, 18th Infantry Regiment was landed to the south, while the 1/26th Infantry covered the north and 1/28th Infantry covered the west. With this cordon established, at 17:45 the target area was hit by over 2000 rounds of artillery fire and 70 air sorties. During the night most of the VC were able to escape to the southwest through gaps in the American lines.

On 29 October BG DePuy assumed direct command of the operation and deployed his units to the southwest to search the probable escape routes, but they were unable to locate the VC. A search of the battlefield found 60 VC dead.

== Aftermath ==
Operation Shenandoah officially concluded on 2 November. BG DePuy considered it a limited success as the VC 9th Division generally avoided battle. Total US casualties were 5 killed, while VC losses were claimed to be 74 killed.
