= Battle of Minh Thanh Road =

Battle of the Vietnam War, 1966

- Part of Vietnam War
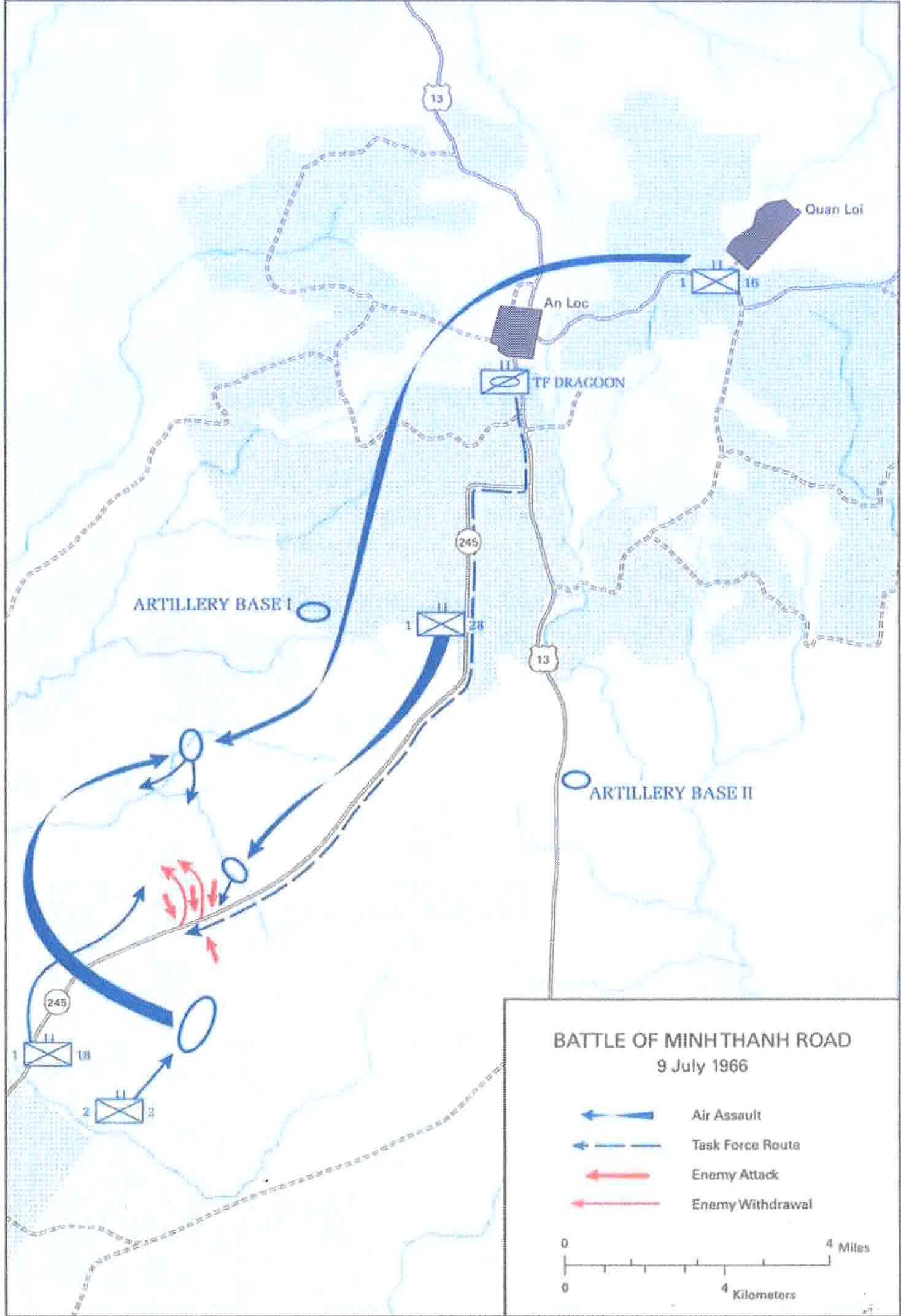
- Battle of Minh Thanh Road, 9 July 1966
Date	9 July 1966
Location	near An Lộc, Binh Phuoc Province, South Vietnam 11.525°N 106.532°E
Result	US claims victory

Belligerents
United States	Viet Cong

Commanders and leaders
Col. Sidney Berry	Col. Hoàng Cầm

Units involved
2nd Battalion, 2nd Infantry Regiment; 1st Squadron, 4th Cavalry Regiment; 1st Battalion, 18th Infantry Regiment; 1st Battalion, 28th Infantry Regiment	9th Infantry Division: 272nd Regiment

Casualties and losses
25 killed	US claim: 238 killed 44 weapons recovered PAVN claim: 128 killed 167 wounded

Part of Operation El Paso II, The Battle of Minh Thanh Road took place on 9 July 1966 when a Viet Cong (VC) force attacked a 1st Infantry Division column and in turn was attacked by a larger reaction force based on three infantry battalions and supporting fire. The VC, primarily armed with RPG-2, recoilless rifles and small arms engaged and destroyed some vehicles in the initial column but were pushed back by the combined reaction force. The attacking VC unit was able to fall back using the heavy jungle in the area as cover.

== Background ==
The commander of the 1st Infantry Division, General William E. DePuy tasked Colonel Sidney Berry with luring the VC to attack a small convoy and then destroying the VC with a much larger reaction force. Based on signals intelligence indicating the presence of a VC command post in the area large enough to support a regiment, Berry chose the Minh Thanh Road/Route 245, which branched off Highway 13 as the best site for the operation. DePuy let the province chief and his staff in Binh Long know a convoy of bulldozers and supply vehicles with a light armored cavalry escort would be sent from An Lộc to Minh Thanh, ostensibly to repair the Minh Thanh airfield. DePuy suspected the VC had one or more agents in the province chief's offices and felt this was the best way to lure the VC into launching an attack. But instead of a small convoy, the actual force consisted of two full armored cavalry troops with attached infantry (Task Force Dragoon) and four additional infantry battalions nearby as blocking and reaction forces.

On 7 July two artillery firebases were established: Artillery Base 1, 6km southwest of An Lộc and west of Highway 13 with a mixed battery of artillery; and Artillery Base 2, 8km south of An Lộc and east of Highway 13 with a battery of 105 mm guns. The 2nd Battalion, 2nd Infantry Regiment (2/2nd Infantry) was deployed in small groups to Minh Thanh, joining the 1st Battalion, 18th Infantry Regiment (1/18th Infantry). On 8 July the 1st Battalion, 28th Infantry Regiment (1/28th Infantry) deployed 2.5 kilometres east of Artillery Base 1 and the 1st Battalion, 16th Infantry Regiment was deployed at Quản Lợi Base Camp.

== Battle ==
At 07:00 on 9 July Task Force Dragoon (Company B, 1/2nd Infantry and Troops B and C, 1st Squadron, 4th Cavalry Regiment) left An Lộc. As the column moved down the Minh Thanh Road air and artillery strikes hit likely ambush sites.

Around 11:00 lead units from Troop C detected an L-shaped ambush along the road. At 11:10 the VC opened their ambush, attacking Troop C's 1st Platoon with automatic weapons, mortar and recoilless rifle fire. The tanks and M113s deployed into a Herringbone formation to direct fire against the VC positions, while air, artillery and gunship strikes soon followed. Two platoons of Troop B were moved forward to support Troop C and engage the main body of the VC, thought to be on the north of the road. By 12:30 the VC were beginning to withdraw and the 2/2nd Infantry and 1/18th Infantry were deployed to the north in an attempt to block their escape. Most of the attacking forces managed to escape the cordon through the dense jungle in the area.

Around 13:30 aerial reconnaissance saw a large VC force moving northwest of the ambush area and 1/28th Infantry was deployed by helicopter to engage them. A two hour long moving firefight took place before the VC withdrew and 1/28th Infantry swept the area before setting up a night defensive position north of the Minh Thanh Road.

At 16:00 the 1/18th Infantry located a small VC unit and following an artillery strike overran their position, killing 12 VC. Most of the VC attacking force escaped the cordon, using the dense jungle in the area as cover for their retreat.

== Aftermath ==
The Battle of Minh Thanh Road was considered a US victory as the US had lured the VC into attacking a stronger force and then used firepower to inflict serious losses on the ambushers. Total US casualties were 25 killed and 113 wounded, while initial reports claim VC losses were 238 killed (body count) and a further 300 were believed to have been killed, but the bodies were removed. Captured North Vietnamese documents acknowledged that the 272nd Regiment had "suffered heavy losses" due to its "unsatisfactory organization of its withdrawal from the battlefield". A total of 44 weapons were recovered, and 13 crew-served weapons were found. A post-war assessment of the battle from PAVN sources listed 128 killed and 167 wounded.
