= Operation El Paso =

Part of the Vietnam War (1966)

Operation El Paso/El Paso II
- Part of the Vietnam War
Date	19 May – 13 July 1966
Location	Bình Long Province (now Binh Phuoc Province, South Vietnam 10.9°N 106.8°E

Belligerents
United States; South Vietnam	Viet Cong

Commanders and leaders
BG William E. DePuy; Col. William Brodbeck; Col. Sidney Berry	Senior Col. Hoàng Cầm

Units involved
(United States) 1st Infantry Division: 1st Brigade; 3rd Brigade; 1st Squadron, 4th Cavalry Regiment; 2nd Battalion, 18th Infantry Regiment; 2nd Battalion, 28th Infantry Regiment (South Vietnam) 5th Infantry Division	9th Division: 271st Regiment; 272nd Regiment; 273rd Regiment

Casualties and losses
(United States) 125 killed (South Vietnam) ~19 killed	825 killed 1,249 estimated killed

Operation El Paso and Operation El Paso II were operations conducted during the Vietnam War by the U.S. Army's 3rd Brigade, 1st Infantry Division in Bình Long Province, lasting from 19 May to 13 July 1966.

== Prelude ==
In April 1966, prisoner interrogations revealed that the Viet Cong (VC) 271st and 273rd Regiments of the 9th Division were moving into War zone C. In early May a captured VC notebook revealed plans for a major offensive near Lộc Ninh. A CIDG patrol also killed a VC officer 5 kilometres southeast of Lộc Ninh and retrieved documents showing that 3 regiments from the 9th Division and the People's Army of Vietnam (PAVN) 101st Regiment planned attacks near Lộc Ninh by 10 May. The attack did not materialize, but on 17 May Army of the Republic of Vietnam (ARVN) forces tangled with VC from the 271st and 273rd Regiments west of An Lộc. BG William E. DePuy instructed Col Brodbeck's 3rd Brigade to counter the coming offensive.

== Operation ==
=== El Paso ===
From 19–20 May, the 3rd Brigade's three infantry battalions moved to Lộc Ninh and began area searches. By 24 May the searches had failed to locate the VC and BG DePuy ordered the 3rd Brigade to withdraw from the area.

=== El Paso II ===
In late May, US intelligence learned that the VC had postponed their Bình Long offensive and now planned to cut Highway 13 and attack An Lộc, Chơn Thành and Lộc Ninh. MG Jonathan O. Seaman ordered BG DePuy to counter this new offensive and Operation El Paso II was launched on 2 June. The 3rd Brigade already in the operational area would be reinforced by the 1st Squadron, 4th Cavalry Regiment (1/4th Cavalry), the 2nd Battalion, 18th Infantry Regiment (2/18th Infantry) and the 2nd Battalion, 28th Infantry Regiment.

On 8 June, Troop A 1/4th Cavalry comprising 9 M48 tanks and 32 other armored vehicles left Phu Loi Base Camp to move to An Lộc. That afternoon near the village of Tau O the lead M48 was disabled by a mine as part of an ambush by 2 battalions of the 272nd Regiment. The remaining vehicles formed a perimeter and fought off the VC attack for several hours before reinforcements from the ARVN 5th Division arrived and the VC withdrew. Searches of the area found 105 VC bodies and it was estimated that a further 200-250 dead had been removed, US losses were 14 killed and ARVN losses were 19 killed.

On 9 June, the operation was expanded by the addition of Col Sidney Berry's 1st Brigade, 1st Infantry Division which was tasked with searching for the VC from Highway 13 west to Minh Thanh.

On 11 June, Company A 2/28th Infantry patrolling northwest of Lộc Ninh with a CIDG platoon was engaged by the VC 1st Battalion, 273rd Regiment located on two adjacent hills, Hill 150 and Hill 175. As the battle developed Company C 2/28th Infantry was deployed as reinforcements and following air and artillery strikes assaults were launched on the hills. At 14:30 Company C and the battalion's reconnaissance platoon assaulted Hill 177 from the south and west but were pushed back by a VC counterattack. The reconnaissance platoon took position in a trench which was covered by a VC machine gun and lost 19 killed. Despite this by 16:15 the VC were forced from the hill and withdrew northwest harassed by air and artillery strikes. On Hill 150 Company A made 2 assaults both of which were repulsed, Company B then joined the fight and by 16:30 had forced the VC from the hill where they were ambushed by a waiting CIDG Company. US losses were 33 killed, while VC losses were 98 by body count and subsequent intelligence indicated that half of the 1st Battalion had been killed.

On 30 June, Troops B and C 1/4th Cavalry and Company C 2/18th Infantry left An Lộc to escort engineers to repair a bridge at Cam Le and carry out reconnaissance along Highway 13 north of the bridge. At 09:40 as Troop B proceeded north of the intersection of Highway 13 and Highway 17, they drove into an L-shaped ambush by the 271st Regiment. Within 30 minutes all of Troop B's M48s had been disabled. Air strikes and gunships were directed to support the beleaguered unit and Troop C rushed to the scene allowing Troop B to withdraw south and then west to set up blocking positions. By midday the VC began to withdraw to the west, fighting their way past reinforcements arriving at the battlefield. The 1st Brigade was ordered to pursue the VC and deployed west towards the Cambodian border. In order to cover the 271st Regiment's withdrawal, the VC commander Senior Col. Hoàng Cầm ordered the 273rd Regiment to attack Company A 2/18th Infantry which was in a night defensive position near the border. At sunset on 1 July the position was assaulted by a VC platoon, Company C 2/18th Infantry moved to reinforce Company A and the VC withdrew by 20:00. At 05:45 on 2 July the VC attacked the position again with mortar fire and several ground assaults, bad weather delayed US airstrikes but they eventually forced the VC to withdraw by 09:00. US losses were 13 killed, while VC losses were 98 killed and an estimated further 110-152 bodies removed.

== Aftermath ==
Operation El Paso II officially concluded on 13 July. Operation El Paso III was then launched by the 1st Brigade in the same area and continued until 3 September with negligible results. Total US casualties were 125 killed, while the US/MACV claimed VC losses were 825 killed through body count, with a further 1,249 estimated killed.
