= 4th Cavalry Regiment (United States) =

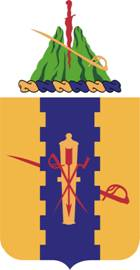
- 4th Cavalry Regiment coat of arms
- Founded: 1855
- Country: United States
- Branch: United States Army
- Type: Armored cavalry
- Mottos: "Prepared and Loyal"
- Engagements: American Civil War; Indian Wars; Philippine Insurrection; World War II; Vietnam War; War in Southwest Asia; Global war on terrorism Iraq Campaign

Commanders
- Notable commanders: Edwin V. Sumner (1855–58); Joseph E. Johnston (1855–60); Robert E. Lee (1861); Ranald S. Mackenzie (1871–81); H. R. McMaster (1999–2002; 1st Squadron)

Insignia
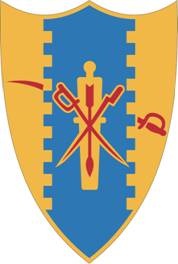
- Regimental distinctive insignia

The 4th Cavalry Regiment is a United States Army cavalry regiment, whose lineage is traced back to the mid-19th century. It was one of the most effective units of the Army against American Indians on the Texas frontier. Today, the regiment exists as separate squadrons within the U.S. Army. Presently, 1st Squadron, 4th Cavalry and 5th Squadron, 4th Cavalry are parts of the 1st Infantry Division's 1st Brigade and 2nd Brigade combat teams, respectively. 1st Squadron, 4th Cavalry's official nickname is "Quarterhorse", which alludes to its "1/4 Cav" designation. The 3rd Squadron, 4th Cavalry, officially nicknamed "Raiders," serves as part of the 25th Infantry Division. The 4th Squadron, 4th Cavalry, was officially stood up in September 2009 at Fort Riley, Kansas, as part of the 1st Infantry Division. It was inactivated in October 2015. The 6th Squadron, 4th Cavalry, served as part of the recently inactivated 3rd Brigade Combat Team, 1st Infantry Division at Fort Knox, Kentucky.

== Origin and early service ==
In 1855, the United States Congress recognized the need for mounted regiments in the U.S. Army in addition to the First and Second Regiments of Dragoons and the Regiment of Mounted Riflemen. The 1st Cavalry Regiment—later re-designated as the 4th Cavalry Regiment—was organized under the act of 3 March 1855. On 26 March 1855, the regiment was organized at Jefferson Barracks, Missouri. The regiment's first commander was Colonel Edwin V. Sumner, who served from 3 March 1855 to 16 March 1861. In August 1855, the regiment was transferred to Fort Leavenworth, Kansas. Colonel Sumner had two missions. The first was to keep the peace between the enslaver and free state factions in Kansas; the second was to protect settlers from attacks by Cheyenne warriors.

The 1st Cavalry Regiment, along with the 2nd Cavalry Regiment, was authorized in 1855 and formed at Jefferson Barracks, Missouri. All field grade officers (majors or above) and one-half of the company grade officers (captains and lieutenants) were drawn from existing army units. The other half of the company, the grade officers, and most of the enlisted men came from civilian life. Each company sent out one lieutenant and one sergeant to city after city to recruit men to fill the ranks. Posters, displayed in each city, promised good clothing, rations, and medical attention. The pay rate was $12.00 a month for privates, $14.00 for corporals, $17.00 for Duty Sergeants, and $22.00 for First Sergeants.

The regiment had four field-grade officers: one full colonel in command, one lieutenant colonel as second-in-command, and two majors. Each of the ten companies had a captain, one first lieutenant, one second lieutenant, four sergeants, four corporals, and eighty-four privates. Also attached to each company were one farrier and blacksmith, and two buglers.

Each company had horses of a distinctive color. This served two purposes. In addition to the dramatic effect on parade, the distinctive color made it easy for members of the regiment to locate their company in the heat of battle. The assigned colors were in the following order: Company A had sorrels, Company B, grays; Company C, sorrels; Company D, bays; Company E, roans; Company F, sorrels; Company G, blacks; Company H, bays; Company I, sorrels; and Company K, bays. The buglers had white horses. The officers each had two horses. They could select any color. Officers were required to provide their uniforms, equipment, and horses.

The following were the initial officers of the First Cavalry. Many rose to high rank during the Civil War.

Colonel: Edwin Vose Sumner

Lt. Colonel: Joseph Eggleston Johnson

Majors: William Hemsley Emory; John Sedgwick

Captains: Delos Bennett Sackett; Thomas John Wood; George Brinton McClellan; Samuel Davis Sturgis; William D. DeSaussure; William Stephen Walker; George Thomas Anderson; Robert Selden Garnett

First Lieutenants: William Nelson Rector Beall; George Hume Steuart; James McQueen McIntosh; Robert Ransom Jr.; Eugene Asa Carr; Alfred Iverson Jr.; Frank Wheaton

Second Lieutenants: David Sloane Stanley; James Ewell Brown Stuart; Elmer Ignatius Otis; James B. McIntyre; Eugene W. Crittenden; Albert V. Colburn, Francis Laurens Vinton; George Dashiell Bayard; Lunsford Lindsay Lomax; Joseph H. Taylor

After a physical exam, the recruits were trained in horsemanship and as cavalrymen at Fort Leavenworth and Jefferson Barracks.

In the fall of 1855, the regiment was ordered to participate in an expedition against the Sioux. As it turned out, the regiment was not directly involved in the major engagement with the Sioux.

In 1856, the regiment was engaged in maintaining the peace in the Kansas Territory between the pro-slavery group, who fought to make the territory a slave state, and the free-state faction, who bitterly opposed them. This conflict had given rise to the term "Bleeding Kansas".

During the summer of 1856, Cheyenne war parties attacked four wagon trains, killing twelve people and kidnapping two. The commander of the Department of the West recommended that the Cheyenne be punished for their attacks on emigrant trains. He recommended that any action be put off until the spring of 1857.

=== Campaign against the Cheyenne of 1857 ===
In May 1857, preparation began for the expedition with the organizing of the 1st Cavalry under Colonel Edwin Vose Sumner at Fort Leavenworth. Sumner divided the regiment into two columns to circle the Cheyenne hunting grounds in central Kansas Territory. One column, under Major John Sedgwick, departed on 18 May with four companies, five Delaware scouts, and forty wagons, heading west along the Arkansas River past Bent's Fort north up to the South Fork of the Platte River. There they were to meet Sumner's column, which had left Fort Leavenworth on 20 May, with four cavalry companies, 300 cattle, and 51 wagons. Sumner's column went north and then west up to Fort Kearny, where three companies of the 6th Infantry Regiment and two companies of the 2nd Dragoons, five Pawnee scouts, and ten more wagons were added. After considerable difficulty in crossing the South Platte River, Sumner's column and Sedgwick's columns met at the South Platte as planned on 4 July. The whole regiment then traveled east through central Kansas to their rendezvous with the Cheyenne on the Solomon River. The inset map shows the routes taken by both columns.

Meanwhile, the Cheyenne, about three hundred strong, were midway between the two columns, probably around the Republican River, where they had spent the previous winter. The Cheyenne consisted of both Northern Cheyenne and Southern Cheyenne. They knew the U.S. Cavalry was searching for them, so they remained banded together longer than they normally did.

On 29 July 1857, the Regiment caught up with the Cheyenne on the bank of the Solomon River. As the two groups paused within about a mile of each other, the cavalry commander, Col. E.V. Sumner, gave the command "Gallop march." Both groups approached each other at full speed. Col. Sumner then commanded, "Sling carbines! Draw Sabers! Charge." It was the first time sabers had been used in the West. The astonished Indians, whose medicine, administered by holy men before the battle, protected them from carbines but not from sabers, became terrified when they saw the sabers. They pivoted and ran as fast as their horses would carry them away from the troopers. The chase lasted for about seven miles before the Indians, having faster horses, pulled ahead too far for the cavalry to follow. During the brief fighting that took place during the chase, two troopers were killed and nine, including Lieutenant J.E.B. Stuart (the future Confederates' most famous cavalry general during the Civil War), were wounded. An estimated nine Indians were killed on the field, and an unknown number were wounded. The cavalry was wounded, and a detachment of infantry was left behind in a makeshift fort while the rest of the 1st Cavalry followed the Indians as best they could.

This engagement was the climax of The Cheyenne Expedition, which began two and a half months earlier at Ft. Leavenworth, Kansas. After the battle, the regiment left the wounded, including J.E.B. Stuart and one company of infantry, and followed the trail of the Cheyenne south towards the Arkansas River. They found and destroyed a large abandoned village that had recently been occupied, but were not able to catch the rapidly dispersing Indians. The regiment received orders to split up and send four companies under Major Sedgewick to join Col. Albert Sidney Johnston at Fort Kearney to become part of the Utah Expedition, while the other two companies were to proceed to Fort Leavenworth under Col. Sumner. However, before reaching Fort Kearney, Major Sedgewick received further orders to return to Fort Leavenworth to rejoin the rest of the regiment.

The regiment was Col. Robert E. Lee's last command in the U.S. Army before the American Civil War. With the outbreak of the Civil War in 1861, the 1st Cavalry Regiment was dissolved and reorganized. Many of its commissioned officers rose to prominence during the war, including Lee as well as George B. McClellan and J.E.B. Stuart.

== Civil War ==
As early as 1854, the War Department had wanted to redesignate all mounted regiments as cavalry and renumber them in order of seniority. As the 1st Cavalry Regiment was the fourth-oldest mounted regiment in active service, it was redesignated the 4th United States Cavalry Regiment on 3 August 1861.

Most of the regiment was assigned to the Western Theater and fought against the Confederates in Tennessee, Missouri, Arkansas, and the Indian Territory. In 1861–62, two companies served with distinction in Virginia in the Army of the Potomac before being reunited with the rest of the regiment in Tennessee. Those companies fought in the major battles of First Bull Run, the Peninsula Campaign, Fredericksburg, and Antietam.

The bulk of the regiment fought gallantly and continuously in the western theater from Shiloh to Macon, participating in the fights at Chickamauga, Stones River, and Battle of Nashville.

=== Civil War service ===
With so many regiments being sent east for the war effort, the 1st U.S. Cavalry was initially kept on the frontier until militia-type units were raised to protect against Indian raids. On 22 June 1861, former 1st Cavalry officer George McClellan, now a major general, requested Company A and Company E to serve as his personal escort. These two companies saw action in the Bull Run, Peninsula, Antietam, and Fredericksburg campaigns, and did not rejoin the regiment until 1864. The rest of the 1st Cavalry was committed to action in Mississippi and Missouri.

Since 1854, it had been advocated that all mounted regiments be redesignated as cavalry and renumbered in order of seniority. This was done on 3 August 1861. As the 1st Cavalry was the fourth-oldest mounted regiment, it was redesignated the 4th Cavalry Regiment.

During the early years of the Civil War, Union commanders dispersed their cavalry regiments, conducting company-, squadron (two companies), and battalion (four companies) operations. The 4th Cavalry was no exception, with its companies scattered from the Mississippi River to the Atlantic Coast carrying out the traditional cavalry missions of reconnaissance, screening, and raiding.

In the first phases of the war in the West, companies of the 4th Cavalry saw action in various Missouri, Mississippi, and Kentucky campaigns, as well as the seizure of Forts Henry and Donelson and the Battle of Shiloh. On 31 December 1862, a two-company squadron of the 4th Cavalry attacked and routed a Confederate cavalry brigade near Murfreesboro, Tennessee. In 1863–64, companies of the 4th saw further action in Tennessee, Georgia, and Mississippi. On 30 June 1863, another squadron charged a six-gun battery of Confederate artillery near Shelbyville, Tennessee, capturing the entire battery and three hundred prisoners.

By the spring of 1864, the success of the large Confederate cavalry corps of J.E.B. Stuart had convinced the Union leadership to form their own Cavalry Corps in the East under General Philip Sheridan. The 4th Cavalry was ordered to reunite as a regiment and, on 14 December 1864, it joined in the attack on Nashville, Tennessee, as part of the Western Cavalry Corps commanded by General James Wilson. In the hard-fought battle, the 4th helped turn the Confederate flank, sending them into retreat. As the Confederate forces attempted a delaying action at West Harpeth, Tennessee, an element of the 4th Cavalry led by Lt. Joseph Hedges charged and captured a Confederate artillery battery. For his bravery, Hedges received the Medal of Honor, the first one to be bestowed on a member of the 4th Cavalry.

In March 1865, General Wilson was ordered to take his cavalry on a drive through Alabama to capture the Confederate supply depot at Selma. Wilson had devoted considerable effort to preparing his cavalry for the mission, and it was a superbly trained and disciplined force that left Tennessee, led by the 4th Cavalry. As the column moved south into Alabama, it encountered Confederate cavalry leader Nathan Bedford Forrest. With superior numbers and firepower, Wilson's force defeated the Confederates, allowing the Union troopers to arrive in Selma the next day. On 2 April 1865, the attack on Selma commenced, led by the 4th Cavalry in a mounted charge. A railroad cut and fence line soon halted the mounted attack. Dismounting, the regiment pressed the attack and stormed the town. Selma's rich store of munitions and supplies were destroyed, along with the foundries and arsenals.

Wilson next turned east to link up with General Sherman. His force took Montgomery, Alabama, and Columbus, Georgia, before arriving in Macon, Georgia, where word came of the surrender of Lee's and Johnston's armies. The regiment remained in Macon as occupation troops. After participating in the Battle of Columbus—the last battle of the war—the regiment assisted in capturing fugitive Confederate President Jefferson Davis.

== Indian Wars ==
In August 1865, the 4th Cavalry was sent to Texas. At various times during the next thirteen years, units from its twelve companies occupied military posts between the Rio Grande and Jacksboro, and between San Antonio and San Angelo. {See Fifth Military District for reports of the 4th Cavalry in Texas between 1867-1869}. Before 1871, the operations of the regiment were limited to guarding the mail and settlements against Indians and to desultory attempts to overtake bands of Indian raiders. The regiment's commander during this period, Col. Lawrence Pike Graham, never had to lead a major campaign, and none of the regiment's fourteen skirmishes with Indians was of major significance.

However, in December 1870, Colonel Ranald S. Mackenzie was assigned command of the 4th Cavalry, with orders to put a stop to Comanche and Kiowa raids along the Texas frontier. On 25 February 1871, Mackenzie took command of the 4th Cavalry at Fort Concho. A month later, he moved the regiment's headquarters to Fort Richardson, near Jacksboro; some companies of the 4th remained at Fort Griffin and Fort Concho. In May, while General William T. Sherman, then the commanding general of the army, was at Fort Richardson, the Kiowas brutally mutilated some teamsters from a wagon train on nearby Salt Creek Prairie (see Warren Wagon Train Raid). A few days later at Fort Sill, Sherman had three leaders of the raid, Satanta (White Bear), Satank (Sitting Bear), and Addo-etta (Big Tree), arrested and had Mackenzie return them to Jacksboro to stand trial for murder. On the way, an enlisted trooper killed Satank when he tried to escape; White Bear and Big Tree were later sentenced to life imprisonment.

In August 1871, Mackenzie led an expedition into Indian Territory against the Comanches and Kiowas who had left the agency, but he was later ordered to return to Texas. He then led eight companies of the 4th Cavalry and two companies of the 11th U.S Infantry, about 600 men, in search of Quahadi Comanches, who had refused to go onto the reservation and were plundering the Texas frontier. On 10 October, he skirmished with a group of them in Blanco Canyon, near the site of present Crosbyton, but the entire band escaped across the plains.

The following summer, Mackenzie, with six companies of the 4th Cavalry, renewed his search for the Quahadis. After establishing his supply camp on the Freshwater Fork of the Brazos River (now the White River) southeast of present Crosbyton, Mackenzie with five companies of cavalry followed a cattle trail across the unexplored High Plains into the New Mexico Territory and returned by another well-watered Comanchero road from Fort Bascom, near the site of present Tucumcari, New Mexico, to the site of present Canyon. At the head of 222 cavalrymen on 29 September, he surprised and destroyed Chief Mow-way's village of Quahadi and Kotsoteka Comanches on the North Fork of the Red River about six miles (10 km) east of the site of present-day Lefors, Texas. An estimated 52 Indians were killed and 124 captured, with a loss of 3 cavalrymen killed and 3 wounded. For almost a year, both the Kiowas and Comanches remained at peace.

In March 1873, Mackenzie and five companies (A, B, C, E, and K) of the 4th Cavalry were transferred to Fort Clark with orders to put an end to the Mexican-based Kickapoo and Apache depredations in Texas, which had cost an alleged $48 million (~$1.17 billion in 2025). On 18 May 1873, Mackenzie, with five companies of the 4th Cavalry, crossed the Rio Grande into Mexico; they then surprised and burned three villages of the raiders near Remolino, Coahuila; the cavalrymen killed nineteen Indians and captured forty-one, with a loss of one trooper killed and two wounded. The soldiers recrossed the Rio Grande into Texas at daybreak the next morning, with some of the men having ridden an estimated 160 miles (260 km) in 49 hours. The raid and an effective system of border patrols brought temporary peace to the area. The John Wayne movie Rio Grande (part of John Ford's Cavalry Trilogy) is loosely based on this incident.

=== Red River War ===
When the Southern Plains Indians opened the Red River War in June 1874, the Grant administration discarded its Quaker peace policy and authorized the military to take control of the reservations and subdue all hostile Indians. General Philip H. Sheridan, commander of the Division of the Missouri, ordered five military expeditions to converge on their hideouts along the upper Red River country. In the ensuing campaign, the 4th Cavalry was the most successful. On 26–27 September, it staved off a Comanche attack at the head of Tule Canyon, and, on the morning of 28 September, descended by a narrow trail to the bottom of Palo Duro Canyon. There, it destroyed five Comanche, Kiowa, and Cheyenne villages, including large quantities of provisions, and captured 1,424 horses and mules, of which it slaughtered 1,048 at the head of Tule Canyon. Afterward, Mackenzie, with detachments of the regiment, made two other expeditions onto the High Plains. On 3 November, near the site of Tahoka, in their last fight with the Comanches, the cavalrymen killed two and captured nineteen Indians. In the spring of 1875, Mackenzie and elements of the 4th Cavalry from various posts in Texas were sent to Fort Sill to take control of the Southern Plains Indians.

Meanwhile, the Indians in Mexico had renewed their marauding in Texas. In 1878, General Sherman, at the insistence of the Texans, transferred Mackenzie and six companies of the 4th Cavalry to Fort Clark. This time, Mackenzie led a more extensive expedition into Mexico, restored a system of patrols, and reestablished peace in the devastated region of South Texas.

Outside Texas, Mackenzie and the 4th Cavalry administered and controlled the Kiowa-Comanche and the Cheyenne-Arapaho reservations for several years, and, after the defeat of George Armstrong Custer's command at the Battle of the Little Bighorn in June 1876, forced Crazy Horse and his band of Sioux and the Northern Cheyennes to surrender. In the autumn of 1879, Mackenzie, with six companies of the 4th Cavalry, subdued the hostile Utes in Southern Colorado without firing a shot, and in August 1880 forced them to move to a reservation in Utah Territory.

=== Apache War ===
Immediately thereafter, the 4th Cavalry was transferred to Arizona Territory, where Mackenzie was to assume full command of all military forces in the department and subdue the hostile Apaches. Within less than a month, the Apaches had surrendered or fled to Mexico, and on 30 October, Mackenzie and the 4th Cavalry were transferred to the new District of New Mexico. By 1 November 1882, when W. B. Royall replaced Mackenzie as colonel, the 4th Cavalry had forced the White Mountain Apaches, Jicarilla Apaches, Navajos, and Mescaleros to remain peacefully on their respective reservations.

From 1884 to 1886, the 4th Cavalry again operated against the Apaches in Arizona and helped capture Geronimo. Particularly noteworthy was B troop's pursuit of Geronimo into Northern Mexico, led by Capt. Lawton and Surgeon Leonard Wood.

Sergeant James T. Daniels of the 4th Cavalry was a recipient of the Medal of Honor for his actions during the Cherry Creek Campaign in March 1890 against the Apaches in Arizona.

In 1890, the regimental headquarters was moved to Fort Walla Walla, Washington. The regiment split, with half going to the Department of the Columbia, and half to the Department of California at the Presidio of San Francisco. The California contingent provided the first superintendent and park guardians for the General Grant, Sequoia, and Yosemite National Parks in 1891.

== Philippine Insurrection ==
Once the Spanish–American War had ended in 1898, Admiral Dewey called for reinforcements to defend the Philippines from insurgents and dissident elements of the Philippine Revolutionary Army. Six troops of the 4th Cavalry were sent out in August 1898 and began to garrison Manila. After Filipino forces fired on American soldiers on the San Juan Bridge, the Battle of Manila began. American troops drove out the Filipino forces, and the 4th Cavalry began marching on Malolos, the enemy capital. Because of a mix-up regarding supply and shipping, the regiment's mounts were unloaded in Hawaii and the Troops E, I, and K were forced to ride Philippine ponies, and Troops C, G, and L acted dismounted during the Battle of Santa Cruz under General Henry Ware Lawton, who had served with B Troop of the 4th Cavalry in 1888 during the Geronimo campaign. By August 1899, the remainder of the regiment had arrived, and in the fall the troopers engaged in the Battle of Paye in an attempt to capture the Philippine General Emilio Aguinaldo. Gen. Lawton was killed in action while leading the troops. In January 1901, the 4th Cavalry, now commanded by Camillo C. C. Carr, was assigned pacification duties in the southern region of Luzon and finally shipped home on 31 September 1901. During the Philippine Insurrection, the 4th Cavalry Regiment had fought in 119 skirmishes and battles.

Upon returning home from the Philippines, the three squadrons were sent to Fort Leavenworth, Fort Riley, and Jefferson Barracks respectively. In 1905, the troopers returned to the Philippines, when the Moro Rebellion began. This time, the troopers would operate in the southern Philippines on the islands of Mindanao and Jolo. Between 5–8 March 1906, the 4th Cavalry fought in the First Battle of Bud Dajo, where rebellious forces of the Islamic Sultanate of Sulu had fortified the Bud Dajo volcano. 211 dismounted troopers advanced up the sides of the steep volcano alongside other elements of the US Army and Philippine Constabulary. The going was tough, and they had to slash through the jungle with machetes up a 60% slope. After reaching the enemy defensive positions, the troopers engaged in a gun battle, then charged, and the American bayonet clashed with the Filipino Kris. Nearly 1,000 Filipinos were killed, including civilians not engaged in the battle, and 21 Americans were killed and 70 were wounded. This was the bloodiest battle of the Moro Rebellion, and it is depicted today at the top of the 4th Cavalry's Coat of Arms.

== Early 20th century ==
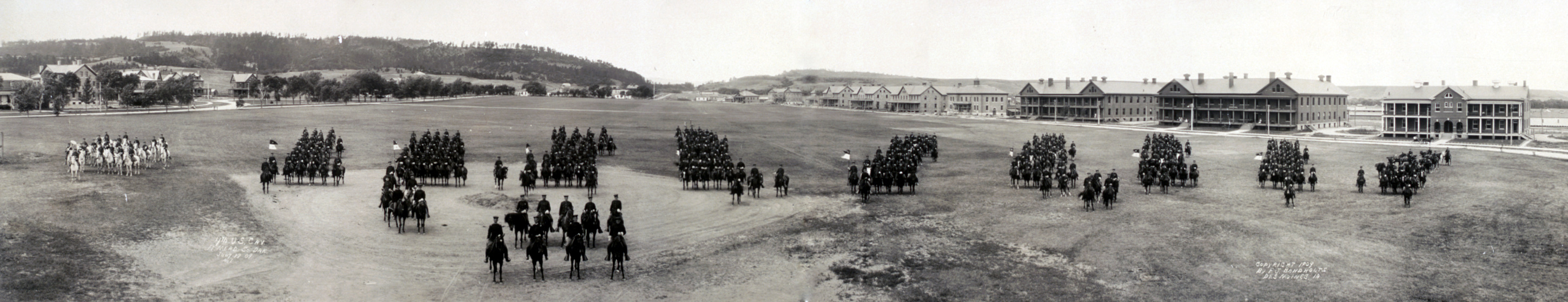
4th U.S. Cavalry at Fort Meade, South Dakota, 17 July 1909

In 1907, the balance of the regiment was reassigned to Fort Meade, South Dakota, while the 3rd Squadron was assigned to Fort Snelling, Minnesota. The 4th Cavalry served on the Mexican border in Texas from 1911 to 1913. For the next six years, the regiment served at Schofield Barracks in the Territory of Hawaii and did not participate in World War I. In 1919, the 4th returned to the Mexican border and patrolled the area near Brownsville, Texas. In 1921, they were transferred to Fort Sam Houston, Texas, and in 1922, the regimental Coat of Arms and Distinctive Unit Insignia were approved by the War Department. In 1925, the regiment returned to Fort Meade, SD, and conducted normal peacetime training and field operations in Wyoming. In 1926, John Philip Sousa, impressed with the 4th Cavalry's reputation, wrote a march for the unit: "Riders for the Flag."

== World War II ==
In 1939, World War II erupted in Europe, and by 1940, the US Army realized that its armored warfare capabilities were inadequate should war come to America. The 4th Cavalry Regiment was redesignated as a Horse-Mechanized Corps Reconnaissance Regiment. The 2nd Squadron was mechanized, but the 1st Squadron retained its horses until the spring of 1942, when it was mechanized as well. In January 1943, the 4th Cavalry left for the Mojave Desert to begin training for desert warfare in preparation for the fighting in the North African Campaign. Orders were changed, however, and the unit was sent to England to serve as the reconnaissance element for the VII Corps. Arriving on 15 December 1943, they camped at Singleton, West Sussex. The 4th Cavalry's designation was then changed to the 4th Cavalry Group, Mechanized (later called the 4th Mechanized Cavalry Group, or MCG). During WWII, the term MCG was synonymous with regiment with regard to cavalry formations. 1st Squadron was renamed the 4th Cavalry Reconnaissance Squadron, Mechanized, and 2nd Squadron was renamed the 24th Cavalry Reconnaissance Squadron, Mechanized.

In preparation for the Invasion of Normandy, the 4th MCG was assigned the task of capturing the Îles Saint-Marcouf, 6,000 yards out from Utah Beach to neutralize the formidable fortifications the Wehrmacht had erected there. Along with this mission, the 4th was also tasked with landing two troops ashore to link up with elements of the 82nd Airborne Division and the 101st Airborne Division behind German lines, providing the paratroopers with armored support.

At 0430 on 6 June 1944, elements of A Troop 4th Squadron and B Troop 24th Squadron landed on the Saint-Marcouf islands. CPL Harvey S. Olson and PVT Thomas C. Killeran of Troop A (4th), and SGT John S. Zanders and CPL Melvin F. Kinzie of Troop B (24th) swam ashore armed only with knives to mark the beaches for the landing craft. They became the first seaborne American soldiers to land in France on D-Day. When the invasion began, the troops rapidly captured the islands with no resistance; the Germans had evacuated, but 19 men were killed or wounded due to enemy mines. On 7 June, just south of Utah Beach, a platoon of Troop B, 4th Squadron, linked up with elements of the 82nd Airborne and managed to ambush a German convoy in a mechanized cavalry charge, causing the enemy to retreat and leave behind 200 casualties. Rough seas prevented C Troop from landing, but they linked up with elements of the 101st on 8 June.

As US forces attacked toward the Cotentin Peninsula, the 4th MCG's two squadrons provided flank security for the 4th Infantry Division and the 9th Infantry Division. Near Cape de la Hague, 4th Squadron fought dismounted in a bloody five-day engagement and captured over 600 prisoners. Both Squadrons were awarded the French Croix de Guerre with Silver Star for their gallantry in the Battle of Cherbourg. After the Battle of Saint-Lô in July 1944, VII Corps began its drive towards Paris, and the 4th MCG assumed responsibility of covering the Corps' flanks. Paris was liberated on 24 August 1944; the 4th crossed the Seine River the next day and the Marne River by 31 August. As the men prepared to enter German-occupied Belgium, the 759th Light Tank Battalion, the 635th Tank-Destroyer Battalion (Self-Propelled), and the 87th Armored Field Artillery Battalion were attached to the 4th MCG, giving it the firepower of a light armored brigade. The Group penetrated the Siegfried Line and crossed into Germany on 14 September, but met stiff German resistance in the Battle of Hürtgen Forest.

On 16 December 1944, the Wehrmacht launched a major surprise attack on the Allied lines in the Ardennes in what would become known as the Battle of the Bulge. The attack landed on elements of VII Corps as well, and some of the fiercest fighting of the war for the 4th MCG occurred on 19–21 December on the edges of the Hürtgen Forest along the Roer River. Here, the troopers of the 4th MCG were ordered to seize the heavily defended town of Bogheim and the high-ground from the southeast. On the 19th, under a blanket of heavy fog, two troops from the 4th Squadron infiltrated Bogheim undetected and engaged the Germans. Still, the two other troops coming to support were spotted and engaged in the open as the fog lifted, and took heavy casualties. Despite this, the Germans were driven out of town by the afternoon. All four troop commanders were casualties, as well as a quarter of all the enlisted men. Nevertheless, the 4th Squadron charged, dismounted, across 200 yards of open field the next morning to capture the nearby high ground. In the Battle of Bogheim, the 4th Squadron had defeated two battle groups of the 947th German Infantry and a company of the 6th Parachute Regiment. For its bravery in action despite heavy casualties, the 4th Cavalry Reconnaissance Squadron was awarded a Presidential Unit Citation.

As the German offensive resumed, VII Corps was sent south into Belgium to block the enemy's advance. By 23 December, the 4th MCG was once again in contact and screened the movement of VII Corps units. On 24 December, the 4th was attached to the 2nd Armored Division. It was tasked with defending the key road junction at Humain to prevent the Germans from separating the 2nd Armored Division and the 84th Infantry Division defensive lines. 4th Squadron left to screen the flanks of CCA and CCB of the 2nd Armored Division, leaving 24th Squadron to defend Humain. By midnight of 24–25 December 1944, Troop A, 24th Squadron, had taken Humain, but was repulsed by a German panzer attack on Christmas morning. The 24th attempted to retake the town, but its light armor was no match for the heavy German panzers, and the troopers made little progress. On 26 December, reinforced by tanks from the 2nd Armored Division, the 24th drove out the Germans from Humain and halted their advance in that sector.

After retaking the ground lost in the Battle of the Bulge, Allied forces resumed their drive into Germany. The 4th MCG conducted more screening operations for the VII Corps advance during the closing of the Ruhr Pocket. As the war in Europe began winding down, the 4th MCG participated in the operation to eliminate a force of 85,000 Germans holding out in the Harz Mountains, and this mission was accomplished on 21 April 1945, with most of the enemy surrendering. The 4th continued advancing and mopped up along the Elbe River, and was in Leipzig on VE Day, 8 May 1945.

== Occupation of Germany and Austria ==
After the Allied victory in World War II, the US Army organized the United States Constabulary to perform occupation duties in Allied-occupied Germany, West Berlin, and Austria. The 4th Mechanized Cavalry Group was redesignated the 4th Constabulary Regiment with the 4th and 24th Constabulary Squadrons. The regimental HQ was located at Camp McCauley in Hörsching, Austria. The 4th Constabulary Squadron was stationed in Wels and the 24th was stationed in Ebelsberg. Several troops were separated and posted to other areas within the American zone of occupation in Austria, where they maintained law and order and security. The 4th Constabulary Regiment was inactivated on 1 May 1949, but its subordinate units remained active. The same day, the 24th Constabulary Squadron was sent to Bad Hersfeld, West Germany, and conducted surveillance along the Iron Curtain until 15 December 1952, when it was deactivated. However, on 21 April 1953, the squadron was redesignated as inactive and renamed the 524th Reconnaissance Squadron. The 4th Constabulary Squadron was redesignated as the 4th Reconnaissance Squadron on 1 April 1949, and then on 1 December 1951 as the 4th Armored Reconnaissance Battalion. After several reorganizations and renamings, it was registered in an inactive status as the Headquarters and Headquarters Troop, 14th Squadron, 4th Cavalry on 1 April 1963.

== Vietnam War ==
Initially, senior US commanders believed that armored cavalry formations would not have success in the dense jungles of South Vietnam, but the successful actions of 1-4 Cavalry, attached to the 1st Infantry Division, and 3-4 Cavalry, attached to the 25th Infantry Division, proved that armored formations could be decisive in the Vietnam War when used in conjunction with mechanized infantry and air cavalry to defeat the People's Army of Vietnam (PAVN) and Viet Cong (VC).

=== 1st Squadron ===
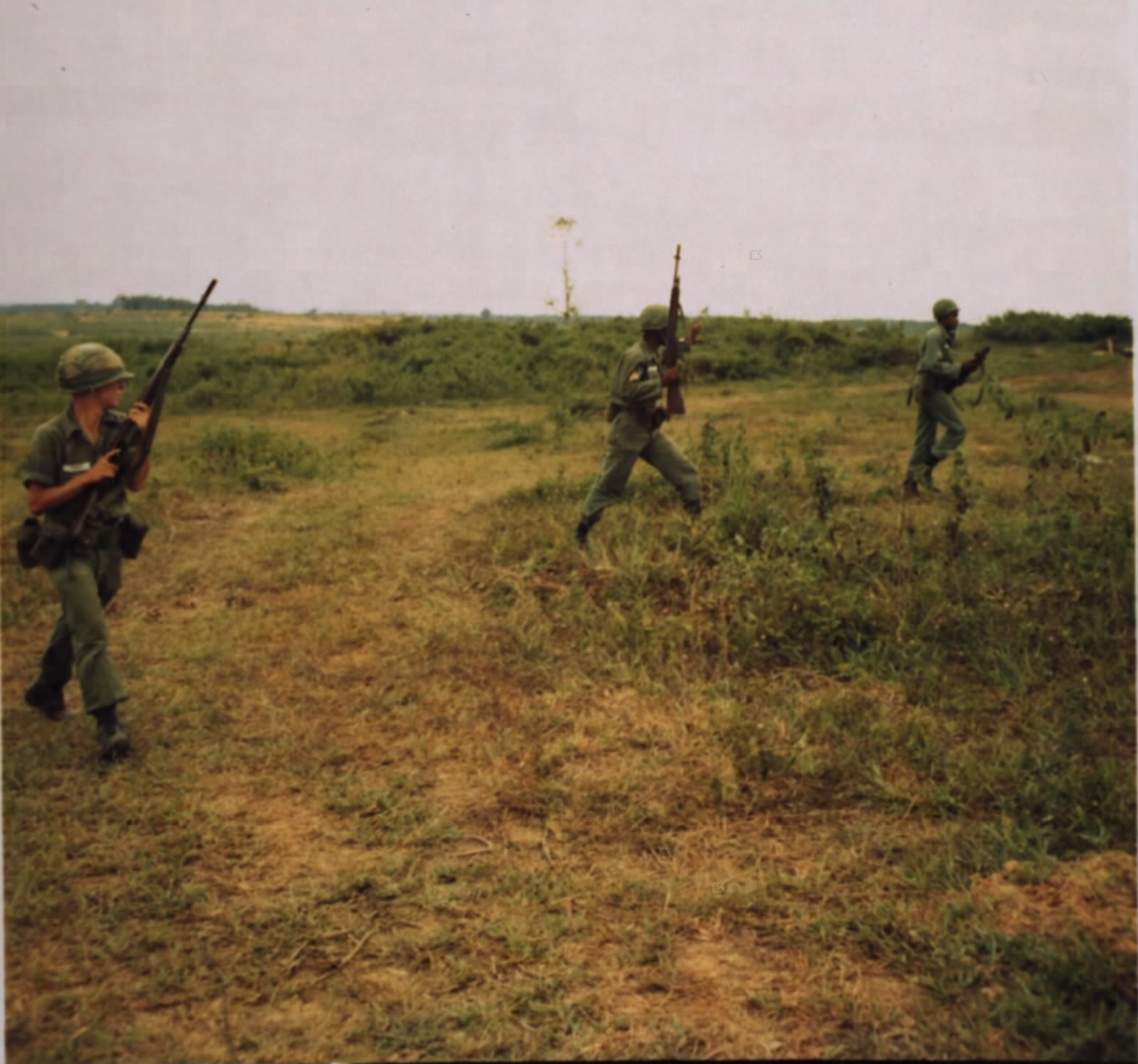
Men of B Troop, 1st Squadron, 4th Cavalry, 1st Infantry Division, deploy from an armored personnel carrier to make a detailed search of an area north of Saigon, 20 October 1965

1st Squadron, 4th Cavalry (1-4 Cavalry, popularly called "Quarterhorse") was assigned as the divisional reconnaissance squadron of the 1st Infantry Division, based at Di An. It arrived at Vung Tau on 7 October 1965, making it the first element of the 4th Cavalry to deploy to Vietnam. Commanded by LTC Paul M. Fisher, the Squadron was ready for action. On 12 November 1965, 1-4 Cavalry received its baptism by fire in the Vietnam War when Troop A, attached to 2-2 Infantry, engaged a VC regiment in the village of Bau Bang. Three enemy probing attacks were thrown back, and on the fourth charge, .50 caliber machine-gun fire broke up their assault, and the enemy retreated, leaving 146 dead. On 24 February 1966, Troop B fought a stiff skirmish with the VC and repulsed the enemy. In April 1966, LTC Fisher became the executive officer of the 1st Brigade, 1st Infantry Division, and his replacement was LTC Leonard L. Lewane. LTC Lewane led the squadron in several operations in conjunction with other elements of the 1st Infantry Division, including Operations Birmingham, El Paso, and Shenandoah.

On 8 June 1966, during Operation El Paso II, Troop A, en route to An Loc, was ambushed by the VC 272nd Regiment along Route 13. The battle lasted 5 hours and resulted in 14 US and 19 South Vietnamese killed. VC losses were 105 dead (body count), and it was estimated that the bodies of a further 200+ were removed. For their courage, Troop A was awarded the Vietnamese Cross of Gallantry. On 30 June 1966, HQ, Troops B, C, D, and C Company 2-18 Infantry engaged the VC 271st Regiment while conducting reconnaissance and managed to kill 300 VC during the seven-hour battle. On 9 July, 1-4 Cav troopers engaged the enemy again in the Battle of Minh Thanh Road and killed 250 VC. For these three engagements, the squadron was awarded the Presidential Unit Citation.

Throughout the Vietnam War, the troopers of 1st Squadron, 4th Cavalry Regiment participated in numerous battle and operations including; Operation Niagara, Operation Cedar Falls, Operation Williston, Operation Tucson-Delta, Operation Junction City, Operation Manhattan, Operation Shenandoah II (where Troop C handed the VC one of their heaviest defeats of the war), the Tet Offensive, and many more in numerous small villages along the Cambodia-South Vietnam border, and throughout South Vietnam. Meanwhile, Troop D provided helicopter support for the 1st Infantry Division and acted as air cavalry, a new concept in the Army. The 1st Squadron participated in eleven campaigns of the Vietnam War from 20 October 1965 to 5 February 1970. The 1st Squadron was awarded the Presidential Unit Citation for its heroism in Binh Long Province as well as a Valorous Unit Award for Binh Duong Province. Troop A, 1st Squadron received a Valorous Unit Award for its actions at the battle of Ap Bau Bang.

=== 3rd Squadron ===
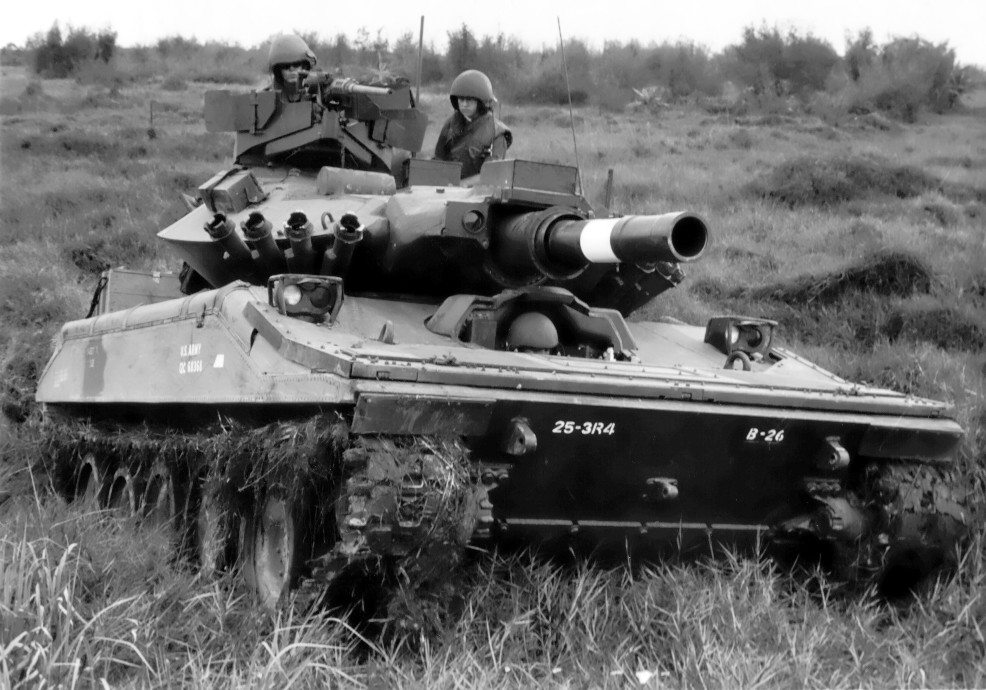
M551 Sheridan and crew members of the 3rd Squadron, 4th Cavalry, 1969

The 3rd Squadron, 4th Cavalry (3-4 Cavalry, or popularly known as "Three-Quarter Horse" or "Mackenzie's Riders" after Ranald S. Mackenzie) acted as the reconnaissance squadron for the 25th Infantry Division. Deploying to Vietnam on 24 March 1966, the men were based at Cu Chi Base Camp northwest of Saigon, while Troop C served with the division's 3rd Brigade in the Central Highlands. Here, Troop C pioneered the use of armored vehicles in dense jungle terrain and fought fiercely against PAVN and VC units. The Troop received a Valorous Unit Award for engaging VC forces in Quảng Trị Province and later joined the rest of 3-4 Cavalry on 1 August 1967. The 3rd Squadron participated in 12 campaigns from 24 March 1966 to 8 December 1970. The squadron's primary mission was to conduct route and convoy security along South Vietnam's Route 1, ensuring that the main supply and communications route from Saigon to Tay Ninh remained secure. By 1967, Mackenzie's Riders was escorting some 8,000 vehicles each month, both day and night. It also participated in large-scale combined arms operations such as Cedar Falls, Junction City, and the invasion of Cambodia. During the Tet Offensive during the Vietnamese New Year in January 1968, 3-4 Cavalry was rushed to Tan Son Nhut Air Base near Saigon, where it successfully repelled a massive VC attempt to seize the air base. For its gallantry at Tan Son Nhut, the 3rd Squadron was awarded a Presidential Unit Citation. In addition, the squadron received two Valorous Unit Awards for battles along the Cambodian border and in Bình Dương Province. Also, Troop D (Air), 3rd Squadron received a Presidential Unit Citation for gallantry in Tay Ninh Province. Troop A, 3rd Squadron, received a Valorous Unit Award for contributing to the defeat of VC forces in the Cu Chi District. The 1st Platoon, Troop A, 3rd Squadron also received a Presidential Unit Citation while attached to 1-5 Infantry during the Battle of Bến Củi.

Troop F, 4th Cavalry, was activated on 10 February 1971 in Vietnam and assigned to the 25th Division as a separate air cavalry troop in support of the 25th Division's 2nd Brigade. After the 2nd Brigade left Vietnam on 30 April 1971, Troop F remained assigned to the 25th while serving with the 11th and 12th Aviation Groups. It was one of the last Army units to leave Vietnam on 26 February 1973.

== Gulf War ==
Three elements of the 4th Cavalry Regiment participated in the Gulf War. 1-4 Cavalry continued to serve with the 1st Infantry Division (part of VII Corps) as a reconnaissance squadron, 2-4 Cavalry served with the 24th Infantry Division (part of XVIII Airborne Corps), and Troop D, 4th Cavalry served with 197th Infantry Brigade, which was in turn attached to the 24th Infantry Division, and Troop D was attached to2-4 Cav control.

In 1990, the First Squadron deployed to Saudi Arabia, as part of Operation Desert Shield. The ground warfare phase, Operation Desert Storm, began on 24 February 1991 in the XVIII Airborne Corps sector of operations, on the left flank of the coalition force. The 24th Infantry Division had the mission of blocking the Euphrates River valley to block the escape of Iraqi forces in Kuwait and then to attack east with VII Corps to destroy the Republican Guard divisions. 2-4 Cav and D Troop, operating independently and under the control of the 197th, crossed the Iraqi border 6 hours ahead of the main assault and scouted north along the two axes of advance. 2-4 Cavalry and D Troop in their sectors found little evidence of the enemy, which enabled the 24th Division to make rapid progress. With elements of the 4th Cavalry screening 5 to 10 miles in front of the attacking brigades, the 24th continued north until around 0141 hours when D Troop set a screen at the 197th Infantry first objective 75 miles inside Iraq. By 27 February, the 4th day of fighting, the 24th Infantry Division had destroyed all Iraqi units it had encountered securing the Euphrates River Valley, and had successfully trapped most of the Republican Guard divisions for the two Corps to destroy.

In the VII Corps sector, the 1st Infantry Division was given the mission of breaching the enemy's defensive line, and the 1-4 Cavalry was selected to lead the way. First Squadron was assigned to 1-41 Infantry to breach Iraq's initial defensive network on the Saudi Arabian-Iraqi border. This joint effort would be known as Task Force Iron. The 1st Squadron had arrived in Saudi Arabia without its tanks, which had been in storage while the squadron served as the Opposing Force (OPFOR) in 1st Division maneuvers in Germany and was short on tank-qualified personnel. 1-4 Cavalry began quickly integrating new replacements fresh from training and readied newly issued tanks for A and B Troops. On schedule, 1-4 Cavalry with its two armored cavalry troops and two air cavalry troops launched the VII Corps attack destroying around 27 Iraqi tanks and armored vehicles in the initial attack. The Big Red One soon had destroyed some ten miles of enemy defenses and had created a breach in the Iraqi lines for the VII Corps to pour through. Now moving east, the Corps with the 1st Division on the south passed through the cavalry screen and attacked the Iraqi forces. By 27 February the 1st Division had destroyed 2 Iraqi armored divisions. The 1st Squadron, 4th Cavalry then set up blocking positions on the Al Basrah – Kuwait City highway preventing Iraqi forces from escaping from Kuwait. 1-4 Cavalry received a Valorous Unit Award for its actions during Operation Desert Storm. Excerpt from orders: "The 1st squadron, 4th cavalry led the 1st infantry divisions attack across Iraq and Kuwait cutting the Iraqi army's escape route, the Kuwait city/Basra highway. The squadron continued its rapid advance, culminating with the capture of the Safwan airfield. During this drive the squadron destroyed 65 tanks, 66 armored personnel carriers, 66 trucks, 91 bunkers, and captured 3,000 enemy soldiers."

A cease-fire was declared at 0800, 28 February 1991. Thus ended the quickest and most overpowering victory in U.S. Army history. The 4th Cavalry Regiment elements that participated in Desert Storm, 1-4 Cav, 2-4 Cav, and Troop D.

== Balkans conflict ==
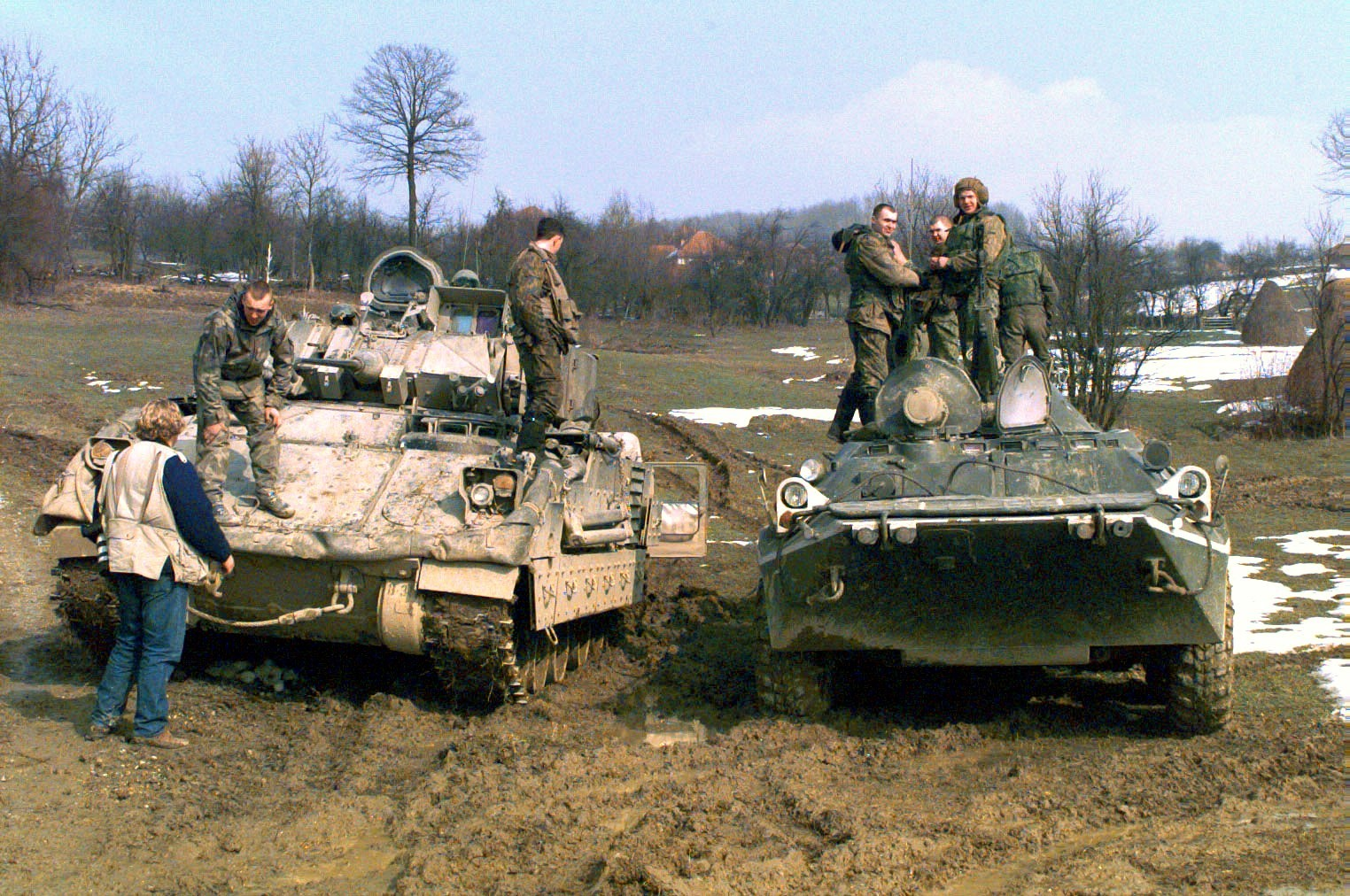
A Russian BTR-80 next to a 4th Cavalry Regiment M2 Bradley Fighting Vehicle during a joint patrol of Zvornik, February 1996

In 1995, 3-4 Cavalry deployed to Bosnia and Herzegovina, (along with 1-1 Cavalry from Buedingen, Germany, under 1st Armored Division) supporting the peace enforcement mission set forth by the Dayton Peace Accord, for a period of eleven months at Camp Molly, Camp Alicia called the "Dog Pound" near Kalesija and Eagle Camp at Tuzla Main. While deployed, 3-4 Cavalry was re-flagged to 1-4 Cavalry and, at the Division level, from 3rd Infantry to 1st Infantry.

1999 saw 1/4 Cavalry returning to the Balkans, this time Kosovo. A "Avenger" and B "Bulldog" troops, ground element, along with E Troop, air element, of 1-4 Cavalry, deployed to Skopje, Macedonia, leaving C troop "Charlie Rock", ground, behind in Schweinfurt, Germany, as a reserve element. In April 1999, the Scout platoons of C Troop were deployed to Camp Able Sentry as dismounted Cavalry to provide additional security support after 3 troopers from Bravo Troop were captured. This event turned the mission from a United Nations mission to a NATO mission. In May, the Squadron redeployed to Germany to prepare for redeployment to Macedonia as a mounted element for forward movement into Kosovo. At the end of June, the squadron was notified of a change of mission, and the drive into Kosovo was handed off to elements of the 1st Armored Division. During the summer of 1999, in support of Operation Joint Guardian, Kosovo Force (KFOR) used OH-58D Kiowa Warrior helicopters to support reconnaissance and security operations in the MNBG-E region of Kosovo. Later that same year, in November 1999, D Troop, 1-4 Cavalry, followed by additional OH-58D Kiowa Warrior helicopters, deployed to Skopje, Macedonia, while awaiting completion of Camp Bondsteel in Kosovo.

== Kosovo ==
The Schweinfurt-based "Quarterhorse" was tasked to be part of the 1st Infantry Division's 3rd Brigade task force due to rotate into Kosovo, in late 2002. The squadron was to lead the U.S. contingent's aviation task force of OH-58D Kiowa and UH-60 Blackhawk helicopters, as well as provide force protection personnel for the U.S. headquarters at Camp Bondsteel. In late-October 2002, soldiers with 1st Infantry Division's, 1st Squadron, 4th Cavalry Regiment were abruptly told they would not deploy to Kosovo for peacekeeping duties, after working for several months to ready equipment they had received for their peacekeeping mission. 1st Infantry Division officials in Kosovo said they could not comment on the change, while a spokesman for V Corps, the division's Corps headquarters, referred all questions to EUCOM, the overall combatant command for V Corps. An EUCOM spokesman said he could not comment on the change, referring all questions back to V Corps. The first trainloads of the squadron's equipment bound for the Balkans from Germany was called back after departing Schweinfurt, en route to the Balkans.

== War on terrorism ==
On 6 November 2002, the 1st Infantry Division published a warning order establishing ARFOR-T (Army Forces Turkey). This mission was enormous, encompassing the subordinate units of 2 heavy mechanized divisions, 4th ID, and 1st ID. Normally, these missions are assigned to corps headquarters. The following months involved extensive planning, command post exercises, and a joint warfighter with 1st ID key personnel traveling to Ft Hood, TX, to conduct planning with the 4th ID staff. During this time, the 1st Squadron's commander, Lt. Col. James H. Chevallier, designated about 40 personnel to form an Advanced Echelon (ADVON), which deployed to Turkey in early February. Their mission was to conduct a detailed route reconnaissance from the seaport of debarkation (SPOD) at İskenderun, on the Mediterranean Sea coast, in south-central Turkey, to the border crossing near the tactical assembly areas located near the towns of Silopi, Dicle, and Cizre, near the Turkish-Iraqi border. The route reconnaissance conducted by less than 30 officers and non-commissioned officers is believed to the longest route recon conducted in modern times; the men assigned the task cataloged every bridge, route constriction and obstruction, hill grade, and curve radius for nearly 500 miles (800 km). The goal of ARFOR-T was to open a second front, to crush Iraqi armed resistance from the North. The Quarterhorse, mounted on the hastily drawn and refurbished HMMWVs they had prepared initially for their Kosovo rotation, would conduct a screen along one of the 4th ID's flanks as it charged south out of Turkey. While the Quarterhorse was conducting route reconnaissance, the Turkish government debated at length whether to allow Coalition forces to invade from their territory, finally signaling in early March 2003 that such an invasion would not be permitted on their soil. By early April, all of the Quarterhorse troopers returned to Schweinfurt, unsure what the future held, as the Iraqi regime was toppled by forces assaulting north from Kuwait. The main body of the squadron never deployed out of Germany, despite being on standby and prepared to move for nearly two weeks in early March.

While the invasion from the north never materialized, the Quarterhorse participated in an accidental yet convincing and important deception that led Saddam Hussein to order several armored divisions to the north to meet the invasion force. Because of this, the enemy force strength, or Order of Battle, was significantly reduced in the South, enabling the rapid assault from Kuwait in the opening days of Operation Iraqi Freedom.

=== Operation Iraqi Freedom (OIF) II ===
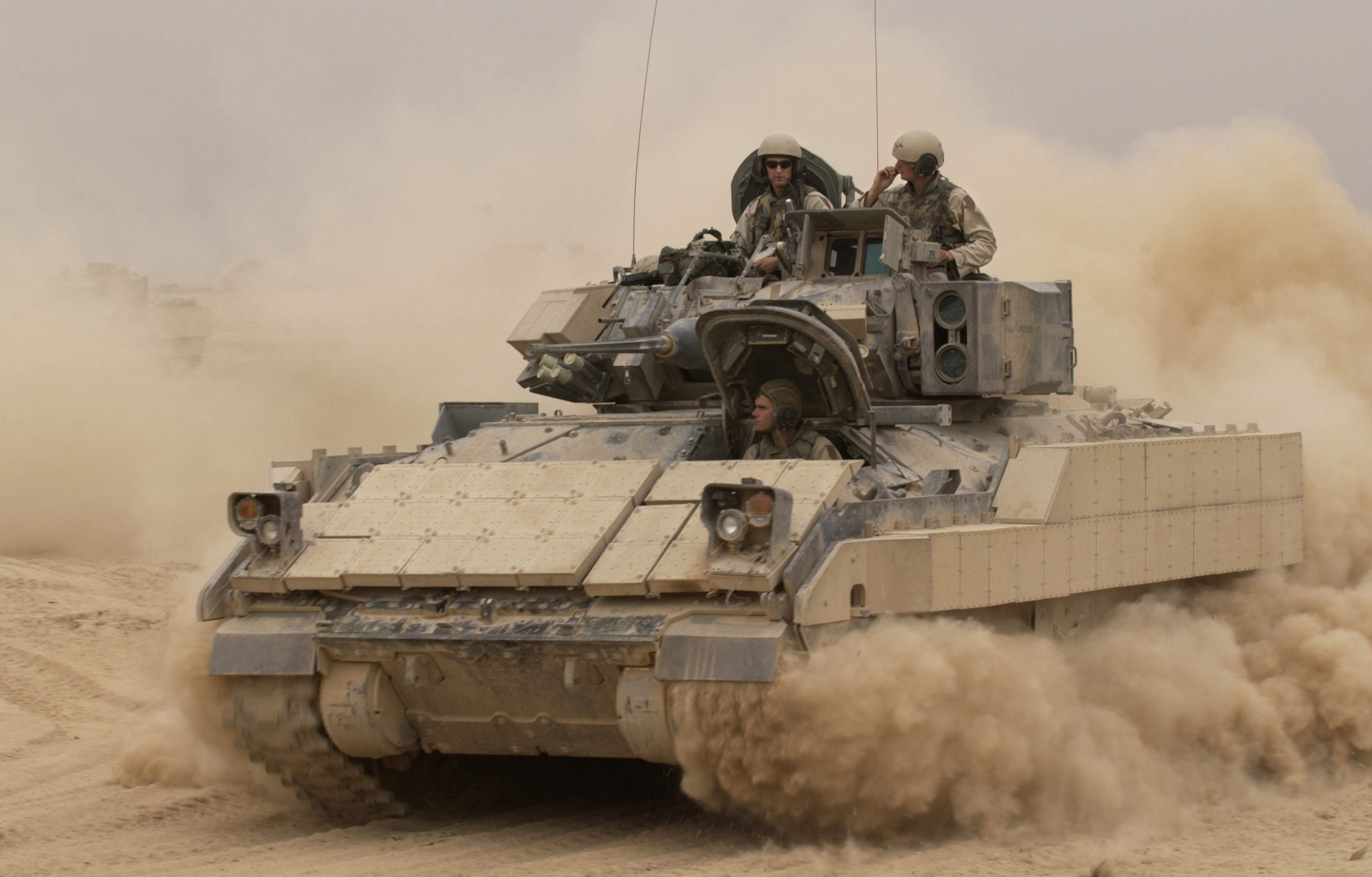
An M2A2 Bradley Fighting Vehicle of 1st Battalion, 4th Cavalry Regiment leaves Forward Operating Base MacKenzie, Iraq for a mission. 30 October 2004

1-4 Cavalry acted as the divisional reconnaissance squadron for the 1st Infantry Division, and Troops D, E, and F acted as the three brigade reconnaissance troops during Operation Iraqi Freedom II (2004–2005). 1ID operated as a part of Task Force Danger in the city of Tikrit, and 1st Squadron with attached elements was organized as Task Force Saber. Their mission was to conduct security and stability operations from FOB MacKenzie near the town of Ad Duluyuah. Attached to the 2nd Brigade, 1st Infantry Division during operations in the city of Samarra from 1 October 2004 through 1 November 2004, 1-4 Cavalry's gallantry resulted in the receipt of a Valorous Unit Award. Troop D served with the 1st Brigade in Al Anbar Province from January to September 2004, also receiving a Valorous Unit Award. Troop E served with 2nd Brigade alongside 1st Squadron from February 2004 to February 2005 and received a Meritorious Unit Commendation. Troop E received a Valorous Unit Award for its actions in the city of Samarra from 1 October 2004 to 1 November 2004. Troop F served with the 3rd Brigade from February 2004-March 2005. Troop F was awarded a Presidential Unit Citation for extraordinary heroism in action during the Second Battle of Fallujah from 8 to 20 November 2004. In January 2005, Quarterhorse oversaw the conduct of the first Iraqi parliamentary elections after the 2003 invasion within their sector. It passed over control of their sector to elements of the 3rd Infantry Division before redeploying to Schweinfurt, Germany in February and March 2005.

=== Operation Enduring Freedom (OEF) 2004–2005 ===
3rd Squadron, 4th Cavalry served in the War in Afghanistan (Operation Enduring Freedom) for one year; from April 2004 – 2005. Initially based at Kandahar Airfield, the 3rd Squadron was under the operational control of the 25th Infantry Division's 3rd Brigade Combat Team organized as Task Force Bronco. Initially, 3-4 Cavalry was responsible for security and stability operations throughout Kandahar Province. Organized as Task Force Saber (not to be confused with Task Force Saber in Iraq), the squadron's two air cavalry Troops (Troops B and C) initiated the first OH-58D helicopter operations in Afghanistan logging over 6,000 hours in support of Task Force Bronco's security and stability missions, while Troop A was mounted on Humvees and conducted screening and route security missions. In addition, the squadron initiated and oversaw numerous reconstruction and educational projects in Kandahar Province. In August 2004, hostilities broke out between Afghan warlords in the western city of Herat. Coalition forces including Task Force Saber halted the hostilities. Task Force Saber remained in the area to disarm the militias, to successfully secure polling sites for the October national presidential elections and to conduct operations to block Taliban infiltration of Regional Command West. In February, the squadron returned to Kandahar Province where it resumed security and stability operations. For its accomplishments in Afghanistan, the 3rd Squadron was awarded a Meritorious Unit Commendation. In April 2005 the squadron returned to its home at Wheeler Army Air Field, Hawaii.

=== Operation Iraqi Freedom (OIF) 2006-2007 ===
In July, 2006, the 3rd Squadron began a tour of duty in Iraq with the 3rd Brigade Combat Team. For most of its Iraq tour of duty, the 3rd Squadron served under the operational control of the 4th Brigade Combat Team, 1st Cavalry Division. It was based in Tal Afar, in western Nineveh Province near the Syrian border. The 3rd Squadron, 4th Cavalry returned to Schofield Barracks in October 2007. Army Cpl. Casey P. Zylman was killed in action on 25 May 2007, of wounds sustained when an improvised explosive device (IED) detonated near his vehicle in Mosul, Iraq.

=== Operation Enduring Freedom (OEF) 2008–2009 ===
In June 2008, the 6th Squadron, 4th Cavalry Regiment, deployed to Kunar Province, Afghanistan, to replace the 173rd Airborne Brigade. They were stationed at FOB Bostick and COP Lowell. They were originally scheduled for 15 months, but halfway through, the deployment was reduced to 12 months. Their mission was to work with and support the local villages while neutralizing enemy insurgents in the area. On May 1st, 2009, an Afghan/US observation post, OP Bari Alai, several kilometers South of FOB Bostick, was overrun by insurgents. FOB Bostick fired constant artillery rounds to stop the attack while FOB Bostick's Quick Reaction Force(QRF) drove down to support the OP. However, the rugged terrain and distance meant the QRF team would never arrive in time. 6-4 Cav returned to Ft. Hood in June 2009.

=== Operation Iraqi Freedom (OIF) 2008-2009 ===
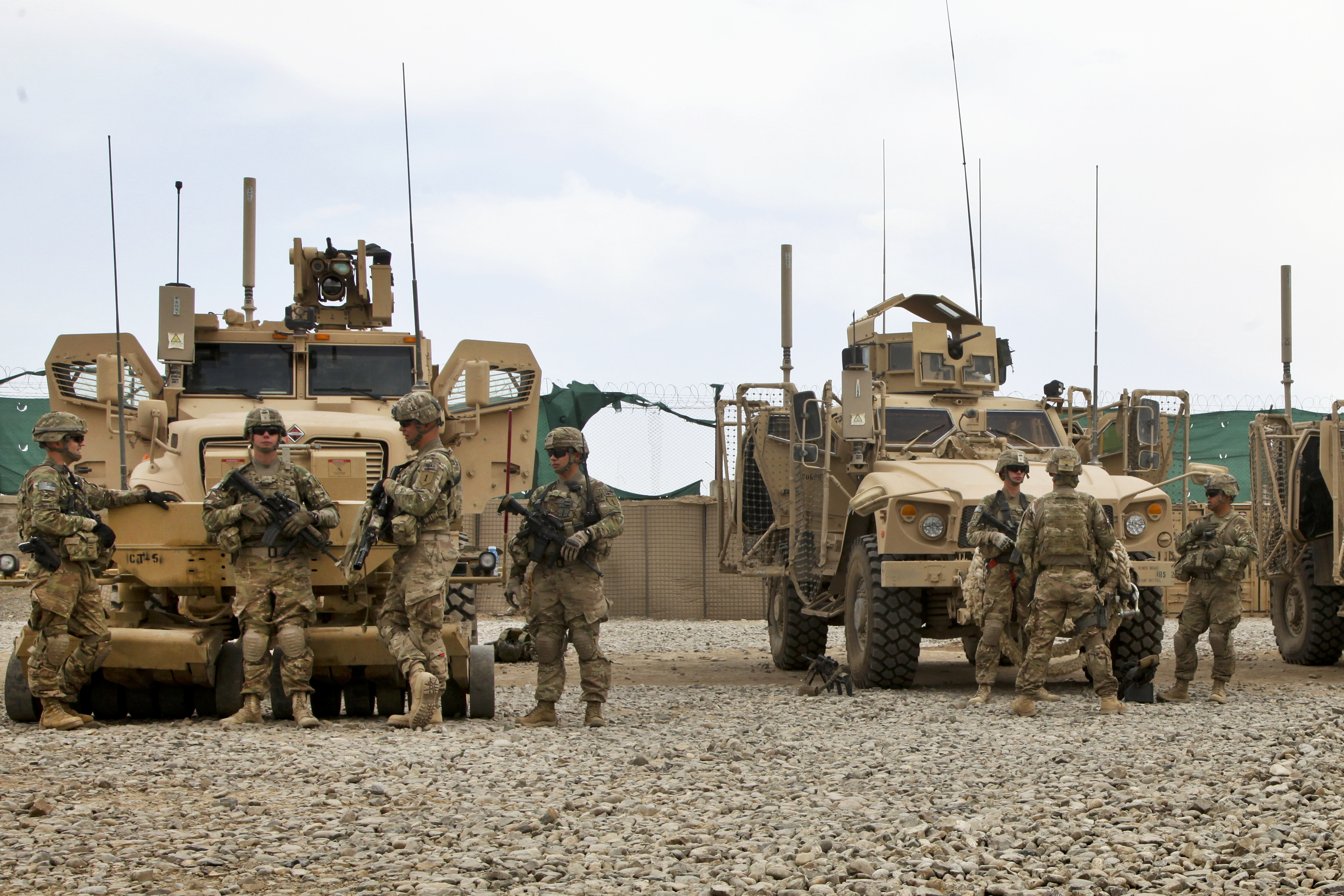
4th Cavalry Regiment soldiers prepare to go on a patrol in Paktika province, Afghanistan. June 2012

In October 2008, the 3rd Squadron returned to northern Iraq for a twelve-month tour of duty. The squadron operated in the Saladin Governorate, north of Baghdad, in the vicinity of Balad City, where it was primarily involved in economic revitalization efforts and joint security operations with Iraqi forces. A-Troop (Apache) was assigned to FOB Paliwoda. For the 3rd Squadron's exceptional accomplishments, it was awarded a Meritorious Unit Commendation and received participation credit for the Iraqi Surge and Iraqi Sovereignty campaign phases. The 3rd Squadron returned to Schofield Barracks in October 2009.

=== Operation Enduring Freedom (OEF) 2011–2012 ===
The 3rd Squadron, 4th Cavalry returned to Afghanistan with the 3rd BCT after an absence of six years in April 2011, and, on 3 May 2011, as part of Regional Command-East, assumed responsibility for security and stability operations in eastern Nangarhar Province, located along the border with Pakistan. The squadron's mission was to provide security, support governance, and assist in the province's economic development. A-Troop (Apache) was assigned to FOB Shinwar. Other elements of 3rd Squadron were assigned to Jalalabad Air Base (Dakota Troop) FOB Connolly (Comanche Troop), FOB Fenty (Huron Troop) and FOB Hughie (Blackfoot Troop), 4-4 CAV was also stationed with 10th MTN at FOB Pasab formerly FOB Wilson.

== Current status ==
- 1st Squadron is the cavalry squadron of the 1st BCT, 1st Infantry Division stationed at Fort Riley, Kansas.
- 3rd Squadron is the cavalry squadron of the 3rd Brigade Combat Team, 25th Infantry Division, stationed at Schofield Barracks, Hawaii.
- 4th Squadron was inactivated in October 2015.
- 5th Squadron is the armored reconnaissance squadron of the 2nd BCT, 1st Infantry Division, stationed at Fort Riley, Kansas.

== Honors ==
=== Campaign participation credit ===
- Indian Wars:
1. Comanches;
2. Solomon River, Kansas; July 1857
3. Little Bighorn;
4. Red River;
5. Remolino;
6. Palo Duro Canyon;
7. Geronimo's Apaches Expedition; 1886
- Civil War:
1. First Bull Run;
2. Peninsula Campaign;
3. Antietam;
4. Fredericksburg;
5. Chickamauga;
6. Murfreesboro;
7. Nashville;
8. Columbus, Georgia;
9. Capture of Jefferson Davis;
- World War II:
1. D-Day – hedgerows of Normandy; 1944
2. Huertgen Forest, Battle of the Bulge; 1944
- Korean War:
- Vietnam:
1. Defense;
2. Counteroffensive;
3. Counteroffensive, Phase II;
4. Counteroffensive, Phase III;
5. Tet Counteroffensive;
6. Counteroffensive, Phase IV;
7. Counteroffensive, Phase V;
8. Counteroffensive, Phase VI;
9. Tet 69/Counteroffensive;
10. Summer–Fall 1969;
11. Winter–Spring 1970;
12. Sanctuary Counteroffensive;
13. Counteroffensive, Phase VII;
14. Consolidation I;
15. Consolidation II;
16. Cease-Fire
- Southwest Asia:
1. Defense of Saudi Arabia;
2. Liberation and Defense of Kuwait;
3. Cease-Fire
- Bosnia
- Kosovo
- Iraqi Campaign
1. Transition of Iraq
2. National Resolution
3. Iraqi Surge
- Afghanistan Campaign
1. Consolidation II

=== Decorations ===
The Below Decorations have been awarded to the regiment as a whole:

1. Presidential Unit Citation (Army), Streamer embroidered BOGHEIM GERMANY
2. Presidential Unit Citation (US) (Army) for BINH THUAN PROVINCE
3. French Croix de Guerre with Silver-Gilt Star, World War II, Streamer embroidered NORMANDY, 4th Cavalry Reconnaissance Squadron [less "B" Troop]
4. Valorous Unit Award for QUANG TIN PROVINCE
5. Valorous Unit Award for FISH HOOK
6. Meritorious Unit Commendation (Army) for SOUTHWEST ASIA
7. Valorous Unit Award for Desert Storm – 1st Squadron
8. Valorous Unit Award for Operation Iraqi Freedom, 1 Oct – 1 Nov 2004 – 1st Squadron
9. Valorous Unit Award For Operation Iraqi Freedom, 12 Mar – 30 Sep 2004 – 1st Squadron
10. Valorous Unit Award For Operation Iraqi Freedom, 14 Mar 2007 – 3 Apr 200 – 1st Squadron
11. Meritorious Unit Commendation (Army) for 30 Aug 2009 to 21 Jul 2010 – 1st Squadron
12. Superior Unit Award for Operation Joint Endeavour – 1st Squadron

== See also ==
- List of United States Regular Army Civil War units

== Bibliography ==
- 4th U.S. Cavalry Regiment Association
- "United States Army Center of Military History; CMH Publication 60-1; "Army Lineage Series: ARMOR-CAVALRY, Part I: Regular Army and Army Reserve." Library of Congress Catalog Card Number 69-60002". Archived from the original on 13 December 2007.
- Shelby L. Stanton; ORDER OF BATTLE: U.S. ARMY, World War II; 1984; Presidio Press; ISBN 0-89141-195-X.
- Merrill, James M. (1966). Spurs to Glory: The Story of the U.S. Cavalry. Chicago: Rand McNally. OCLC 569359.
- Ranald S. Mackenzie on the Texas Frontier, Wallace, Ernest, (Lubbock: West Texas Museum Association, 1964)
- Utley, Robert (1981). Frontiersmen in Blue: The United States Army and the Indian, 1848–1865. University of Nebraska Press. ISBN 978-0-8032-9550-6. OCLC 7169739.
- Bourque, Stephen A.; Burdan, John (2007). The Road to Safwan: The 1st Squadron, 4th Cavalry in the 1991 Persian Gulf War. Denton, Texas: University of North Texas Press. ISBN 9781574412321.
