= Operation Sheridan Sabre =

Part of the Vietnam War (1968–1969)

- Part of the Vietnam War
Date	7 November 1968 – 4 April 1969
Location	Bình Long Province, South Vietnam
Result	US operational success

Belligerents
United States; South Vietnam	North Vietnam

Commanders and leaders
George I. Forsythe	

Units involved
(United States) 1st Cavalry Division; 11th Armored Cavalry Regiment (South Vietnam) 36th Rangers	

Casualties and losses
(United States) 219 killed 6 missing (South Vietnam) 32 killed 1 missing	US body count: 2,898 killed 53 captured

Operation Sheridan Sabre was a security operation during the Vietnam War in Bình Long Province to prevent People's Army of Vietnam (PAVN) infiltration from Cambodia, that took place from 7 November 1968 to 4 April 1969.

== Background ==
On 26 October the 1st Cavalry Division was ordered to move from northern I Corps to III Corps northwest of Saigon near the Cambodian border in an operation named Operation Liberty Canyon. The 3rd Brigade, 1st Cavalry Division was the lead element of the Division and was air-lifted to Quản Lợi Base Camp to begin operations. The 1st Brigade, 1st Cavalry Division established a base of operations at Tây Ninh Combat Base, while 2nd Brigade, 1st Cavalry Division concluded Operation Comanche Falls III and began moving to its base of operations at Tonle Cham Camp.

The operation was part of II Field Force, Vietnam's Operation Toan Thang II and began on 7 November 1968, as the 1st Cavalry Division moved into III Corps. The mission of the division during this operation was to conduct offensive operations in an assigned tactical area of operations, interdict movement of major PAVN forces south into critical areas of III Corps, locate and destroy PAVN forces, facilities, and material, and be prepared to deploy all or part of the division throughout III/IV Corps.

== Operation ==
The 1st Brigade was to conduct offensive operations against PAVN forces and installations in northeastern Tây Ninh Province with one battalion making a reconnaissance in force north and west of Thien Nhon (11.59°N 105.997°E). The 2nd Brigade was located on Landing Zone Rita (11.571°N 106.377°E) and on Landing Zone Billy (11.616°N 106.318°E) and was to conduct offensive operations in the Fishhook area and Saigon River infiltration routes to destroy PAVN forces and installations and secure Highway 13 in the zone. The 3rd Brigade at Quản Lợi was to conduct offensive operations in the vicinity of Serges Road (a PAVN/Vietcong (VC) infiltration route also known as the Song Be corridor that followed the Binh Long and Phước Long Province boundary south southeast from Sông Bé Province) to interdict PAVN infiltration routes and to locate and destroy PAVN caches in that area. One battalion based vicinity Sông Bé Base Camp was to conduct reconnaissance-in-force operations in the vicinity of Adams Road (a PAVN/VC infiltration route through mountains east of Sông Bé Province).

At 23:30 on 13 November Landing Zone Dot occupied by the Army of the Republic of Vietnam (ARVN) 36th Rangers supported by Battery D, 1st Battalion, 5th Artillery came under heavy ground attack from all sides and received intense mortar and rocket fire as PAVN forces attempted to overrun the fire base. The attacking force was a regimental size unit, believed to have been the PAVN 95C Regiment, 1st Division. The attack was beaten back with support from aerial rocket artillery and artillery at nearby firebases. Over 3,000 artillery rounds and 1,500 rockets were expended during the contact which ended at 10:30 on 14 November, with successful defense of LZ Dot and a total of 287 PAVN killed, while ARVN losses were 4 killed and 23 wounded.

On 25 November, a coordinated attack by the PAVN was directed at Landing Zone Ann (11.587°N 106.822°E), at 06:40 elements of 1st Battalion, 7th Cavalry Regiment came under ground attack southwest of LZ Ann which was followed by a mortar attack on LZ Ann. Counter-mortar fires stopped the mortar attack, and the combined fire support from tube and aerial rocket artillery repulsed the ground attack resulting in 130 PAVN killed, 30 of which were credited to aerial rocket artillery.

On 3 December Company D, 2nd Battalion, 7th Cavalry Regiment conducted an air assault into the area northeast of Hớn Quản District. Although the landing zone showed no signs of PAVN activity the company came under heavy B-40 rocket, 82mm mortar, .51 caliber machine gun, automatic and small arms fire. In addition, the PAVN employed command detonated mines. Airstrikes, aerial rocket artillery and artillery support enabled the company to repulse a number of ground attacks by the estimated battalion size force. Company A, 2/7th Cavalry air assaulted into the landing zone to reinforce Company D. The contact broke after more than five hours of fierce battle. US losses were 24 killed and 1 missing, while PAVN losses were unknown. Sergeant John Noble Holcomb would be posthumously awarded the Medal of Honor for his actions in this battle.

On 9 December while conducting a reconnaissance in force in the vicinity of grid reference XT 685845 (11.615°N 106.545°E) southwest of Hớn Quản, Company A, 5/7th Cavalry came in contact with an estimated PAVN company. Troop C, 1st Squadron, 11th Armored Cavalry Regiment (11th ACR), provided fire support in the 5 hour long battle. The PAVN were defeated leaving behind 93 killed, 1 captured, 3 B-40 rocket launchers and 12 individual weapons. US losses were 14 killed.

On 14 December while operating in the vicinity of grid reference XT 182655 (11.446°N 106.093°E) north of Trang Sup, Troop A, 1st Squadron, 9th Cavalry Regiment helicopters spotted 30 PAVN and engaged with organic weapons resulting in 20 PAVN killed.

The Christmas ceasefire went into effect at 18:00 on 24 December, and extended until 18:00 25 December. At 11:00 on 25 December, surveillance helicopters received approximately 300 rounds of automatic weapons fire. Artillery and air strikes were placed on several suspected PAVN locations. On 27 December, approximately 60 PAVN were spotted at grid XT 575885 (11.652°N 106.444°E), artillery and air strikes were called in which resulted in 41 PAVN killed. On 27 December, two companies of 2nd Battalion, 2nd Mechanized Infantry Regiment which were under the operational control of the 2nd Brigade received intense automatic weapons fire from three sides. The contact lasted for approximately 4 hours during which support from artillery, aerial rocket artillery and air strikes resulted in 52 PAVN killed and 2 captured for US losses of 2 killed.

On 28 December 28 Troop B, 1/9th Cavalry conducted an aerial reconnaissance in the vicinity of grid reference XT 985785 (11.56°N 106.082°E), near Phuoc Binh and received heavy automatic weapons fire. The Troop engaged the PAVN with organic weapons and requested a tactical air strike. After the fire ceased, a search of the area was conducted revealing 59 PAVN killed. In a continued aerial search additional small groups of PAVN were sighted. In each case the Troop engaged with organic weapons, resulting in an additional 12 PAVN killed.

During January, PAVN activity increased throughout the 2nd Brigade area. On 8 January Company B, 2/2 Mechanized made contact with a PAVN enemy company in the vicinity of grid reference XT 814793 (11.568°N 106.663°E) resulting in 27 PAVN killed and 1 captured. On 11 and 12 January an estimated company size PAVN force ambushed a convoy of elements from 1st Squadron, 11th ACR and 2/2 Mechanized Infantry, on Highway 13 eight kilometers south of An Lộc. Two M113 armored personnel carriers were destroyed and 3 US killed. The convoy overran the ambush elements killing 31 PAVN. Artillery and air support killed an additional 106 PAVN. On 19 January Company C, 5/7th Cavalry at grid reference XT 545826 (11.6°N 106.417°E), received and repulsed a ground probe resulting in 5 PAVN killed and 3 captured. On 21 January Company C, 5/7 Cavalry in the vicinity of grid reference XT 547826 (11.6°N 106.419°E), found 15 bunkers containing an estimated 30 tons of large and small caliber ammunition including 147,620 rounds of small arms ammunition.

At 03:30 on 23 February a force from the VC 1st Battalion, 95th Regiment attacked Landing Zone Grant. The attack was repulsed with the VC losing 16 killed and 2 captured. At 00:30 on 8 March 1969 a PAVN force assaulted Grant again and the battle continued until 06:15 when the PAVN broke contact. The 2nd Battalion, 12th Cavalry Regiment defending the base lost 13 killed while PAVN losses were 157 killed and 2 captured and 23 individual and 10 crew-served weapons captured. At 01:45 on 11 March a PAVN/VC force assaulted Grant again supported by mortar and rocket fire before breaking contact at 03:30. The 2/12th Cavalry lost 15 killed while PAVN losses were 62 killed and 2 captured.

== Aftermath ==
US casualties were 219 killed and 6 missing, ARVN losses were 32 killed, 1 missing, while PAVN casualties were 2,898 killed and 53 captured.
