= John Holcomb =

John Holcomb may refer to:

- John Noble Holcomb, United States Army soldier and Medal of Honor recipient
- John W. Holcomb, American judge
