= William A. Knowlton =

United States Army general (1920–2008)

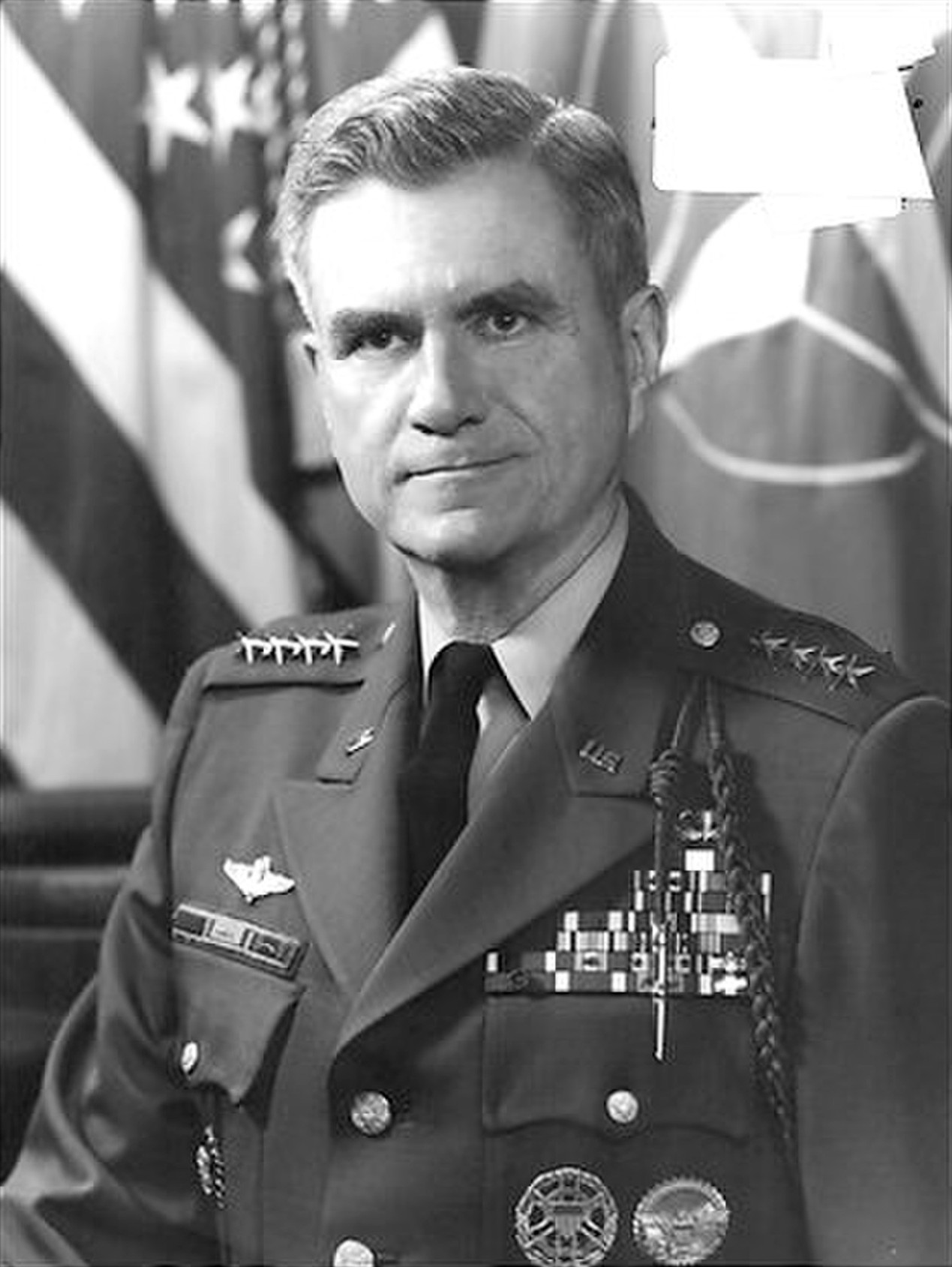
- Born: William Allen Knowlton; 19 June 1920; Weston, Massachusetts, U.S.
- Died: 10 August 2008 (aged 88); Arlington, Virginia, U.S.
- Children: Holly Petraeus
- Relatives: David Petraeus (son-in-law)
- Military career
- Allegiance: United States of America
- Branch: United States Army
- Service years: 1943–1980
- Rank: General
- Commands: Superintendent, United States Military Academy; Allied Land Forces South East Europe
- Conflicts: World War II; Cold War; Vietnam War
- Awards: Defense Distinguished Service Medal; Army Distinguished Service Medal; Silver Star (3); Distinguished Flying Cross; Bronze Star; Air Medals (10)

General William Allen Knowlton (19 June 1920 – 10 August 2008) was a United States Army four-star general, and a former superintendent of the United States Military Academy. As a full general, he served as Commander, Allied Land Forces South East Europe, and as the United States military representative to the North Atlantic Treaty Organization.

== Military career ==
In January 1943, after graduating from the United States Military Academy, Knowlton was commissioned in the cavalry. He reported for duty with the 7th Armored Division, and during World War II led an assault gun platoon in France, and later a reconnaissance troop in Germany, which linked up with the Russians, advancing from the east, in Ganzlin, northwest of Berlin. For this he was awarded the Silver Star.

Following the war, he held various staff postings, and graduated from the Command and General Staff College in 1955. Following graduation, he was assigned to his alma mater's Department of Social Sciences, becoming an associate professor. He next took command of a battalion of the 3rd Armored Cavalry Regiment, and then attended the U.S. Army War College. Before taking command of a brigade at Fort Knox, he served as military attaché in Tunis.

Returning from Tunis, he was assigned to the Pentagon in the Office of the United States Army Chief of Staff and later the Office of the Secretary of Defense. He deployed to Vietnam for two tours of duty where he oversaw Civil Operations and Revolutionary Development Support (CORDS) for General William Westmoreland, and served as assistant division commander for the 9th Infantry Division.

After his time in Vietnam, he became Secretary of the Army General Staff, and on 23 March 1970 he became the 49th Superintendent of the United States Military Academy, an assignment he held for four years. In 1974, during his tenure, the United States Supreme Court reaffirmed West Point's right to enforce the Honor Code in response to two challenges from cadets.

After his time as superintendent, he was assigned as chief of staff of the United States European Command. Promoted to full general in 1976, he took command of Allied Land Forces South East Europe, and finished his career as the United States representative on NATO's Military Committee.

== Decorations ==
Knowlton's awards and decorations include the Defense Distinguished Service Medal, the Army Distinguished Service Medal, the Silver Star with 2 oak leaf clusters, the Distinguished Flying Cross, the Bronze Star, Air Medal with 9 oak leaf clusters.

His foreign awards include the French Legion d'Honneur and the Großes Verdienstkreuz mit Stern from Germany.

- Defense Distinguished Service Medal
- Army Distinguished Service Medal
- Silver Star with two oak leaf clusters
- Distinguished Flying Cross
- Bronze Star
- Air Medal with one silver oak leaf cluster and three bronze oak leaf clusters

== Post military ==
In retirement, Knowlton served as a Senior Fellow at the National Defense University, lectured at the Armed Forces Staff College, served as an advisor for the Defense Nuclear Agency, and was a member of the Defense Intelligence Agency Science and Technology Advisory Board.

Knowlton was also on the board of Chubb Corporation.

He was the 2004 Distinguished Graduate Award recipient from the Association of Graduates, the United States Military Academy alumni organization.

A collection of Gen. Knowlton's military uniforms and awards is on display at the American Military Museum in Charleston, South Carolina.

He died in 2008 as a result of intracranial bleeding after a fall, along with Parkinson's disease. He was 88.

== Personal life ==
Knowlton's daughter, Hollister "Holly" Knowlton, married future four-star general David Petraeus two months after Petraeus graduated from West Point. Knowlton was Superintendent at the time. Holly is a graduate of Dickinson College.

Military offices
Preceded by Samuel W. Koster	Superintendents of the United States Military Academy; 1970–1974	Succeeded by Sidney Bryan Berry
