= Holly Petraeus =

American activist (born 1952)

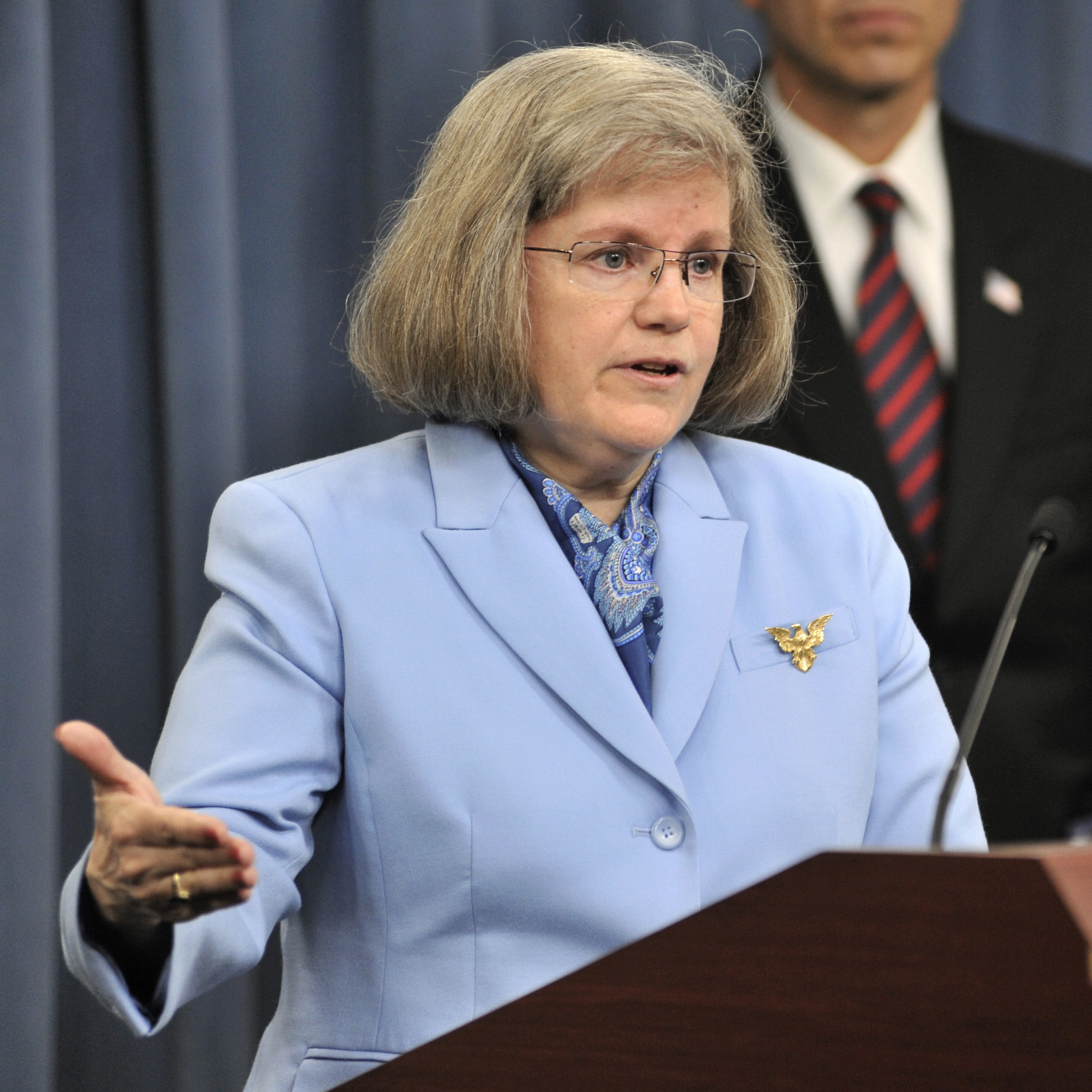
- Born: Hollister K. Knowlton; July 17, 1952 (age 74); Paris, France
- Education: Dickinson College (BA)
- Spouse: David Petraeus (m. 1974)
- Children: 2
- Father: William A. Knowlton

Hollister K. Petraeus (née Knowlton; born July 17, 1952) is a retired Assistant Director at the Consumer Financial Protection Bureau (CFPB), where she headed up the Office of Servicemember Affairs. She retired on January 12, 2017. Her work at the CFPB centered around educating service members on sound financial management and protecting them against predatory lending and cons. She is the wife of retired General David Howell Petraeus.

== Early life and education ==
Petraeus was born as Hollister K. Knowlton in Paris, France, into a military family. Her father, General William Allen Knowlton, was a United States Army four-star general, and a former Superintendent of the United States Military Academy. She was presented as a debutante to high society at the prestigious International Debutante Ball at the Waldorf-Astoria Hotel in New York City.

Petraeus graduated summa cum laude from Dickinson College in Carlisle, Pennsylvania in 1974, with honors in French. She is a member of Phi Beta Kappa.

== Career ==
Petraeus spent six years as the Director of BBB Military Line, a program of the Council of Better Business Bureaus providing consumer education and advocacy for service members and their families. She helped develop the curriculum now used to educate service members in sensible financial management.

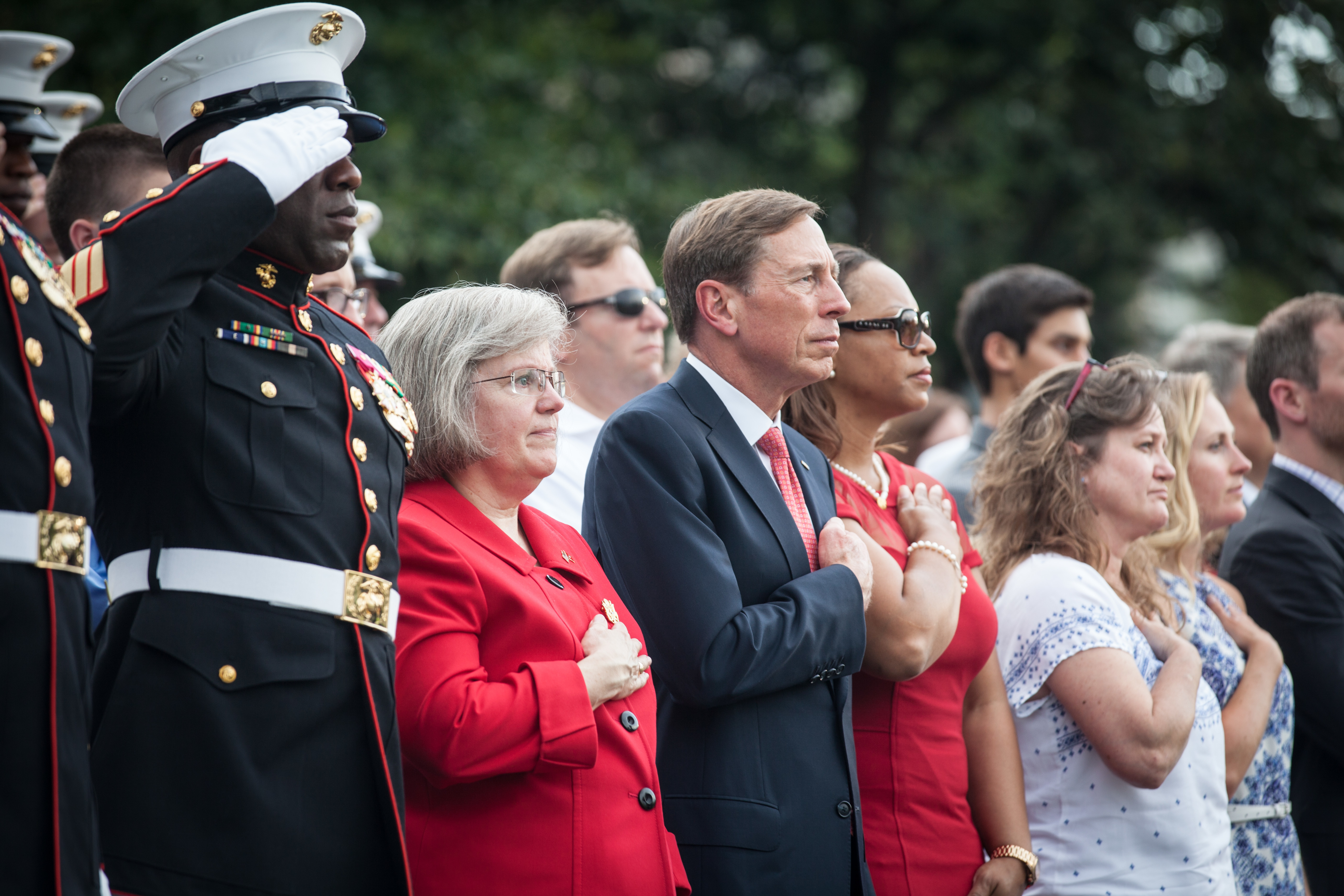
The 18th Sergeant Major of the Marine Corps, Ronald L. Green, hosts a sunset parade at the Marine Corps War Memorial in Arlington County, Virginia on August 11, 2015. The Honorable Mrs. Holly Petraeus, Assistant Director, Service Member Affairs at the Consumer Financial Protection Bureau, was the guest of honor at the parade.

In 2011, Elizabeth Warren appointed Petraeus to be Assistant Director of the Consumer Financial Protection Bureau, leading the Office of Servicemember Affairs. The office partners with the Pentagon to see that military families receive a strong financial education; monitors their complaints to the CFPB; and coordinates efforts of federal and state agencies regarding consumer protection measures for military families.

Petraeus wrote extensively for the CFPB's blog, with 50+ published articles as of July 2016. She has also been published in The New York Times, writing about exploitable clauses in the Higher Education Act that incentivize private for-profit colleges to see service members as “dollar signs in uniform” and recruit them aggressively. She is frequently interviewed in regards to her work, and has served as a public speaker at events like the National Conference of State Legislature's 2013 Legislative Summit.

Petraeus appeared before several Congressional committees in her role at the CFPB in order to increase U.S. lawmakers’ awareness of the financial difficulties facing military service members.

== Honors and awards ==
=== Honorary degrees ===
- Methodist University in Fayetteville, North Carolina, May 2011, honorary Doctor of Public Service
- University of San Francisco, May 2012, honorary Doctor of Humane Letters

=== Awards ===
- Department of Defense Medal for Distinguished Public Service (August 2011)
- Department of the Army Decoration for Distinguished Civilian Service (August 2011)
- Department of the Army Outstanding Civilian Service Award (June 2001)
- Oklahoma Medal of Freedom (Apr 2011)
- Beacon of Ethics Award, The Greater Omaha Alliance for Business Ethics at Creighton University (Sept 2010)
- PenFed Foundation “Community Hero Award” (May 2013)
- Easter Seals Serving DC, Maryland and Virginia "Advocacy Award" (May 2014)
- Daughters of the American Revolution (DAR), recipient of the first President General's Medallion (June 2012)
- HillVets 100 (2014)
- The Women's Center (McLean, Virginia) 28th Annual Leadership Conference Award (March 2014)
- National Military Family Association "Support of Military Families Award" (March 2017)
- American Bankruptcy Institute Annual Service Award (April 2022)

== Personal life ==
Petraeus comes from a family known for a history of military service. Her great-great grandfather fought in the Civil War and the Indian Wars; her great-grandfather was a brigadier general who fought in the Spanish–American War and World War I; her grandfather served in both World Wars, earning a Silver Star in the first and rising to lieutenant colonel in the second. Her father, William A. Knowlton, was a retired four-star general and NATO commander. He was also Superintendent of the United States Military Academy.

In 1974, she married David Petraeus, whom she met when he was a cadet at the United States Military Academy. They have a daughter and a son and reside in the Washington, D.C., area.
