= Landing Zone Grant =

Former U.S. Army base in Vietnam

Site information
- Type: Army
- Condition: abandoned

Location
- Coordinates: 11.416°N 106.271°E

Site history
- Built: 1969
- In use: 1969
- Battles/wars: Vietnam War

Garrison information
- Occupants: 1st Cavalry Division

Landing Zone Grant is a former U.S. Army base in Tay Ninh Province, Vietnam.

== History ==
The base was originally established by the 1st Cavalry Division during Operation Sheridan Sabre and located 11km east northeast of Nui Ba Den on a major People's Army of Vietnam (PAVN) and Vietcong (VC) infiltration route.

At 03:30 on 23 February 1969 a force from the VC 1st Battalion, 95th Regiment attacked Grant. The attack was repulsed with the VC losing 16 killed and 2 captured.

At 00:30 on 8 March 1969 a PAVN force assaulted Grant again and the battle continued until 06:15 when the PAVN broke contact. The 2nd Battalion, 12th Cavalry Regiment defending the base lost 13 killed while PAVN losses were 157 killed and two captured and 23 individual and 10 crew-served weapons captured.

At 01:45 on 11 March, a PAVN/VC force assaulted Grant again supported by mortar and rocket fire before breaking contact at 03:30. The 2/12th Cavalry lost 15 killed while PAVN losses were 62 killed and two captured.

== Current use ==
The base is abandoned and turned over to farmland.
