= John Noble Holcomb =

United States Army Medal of Honor recipient

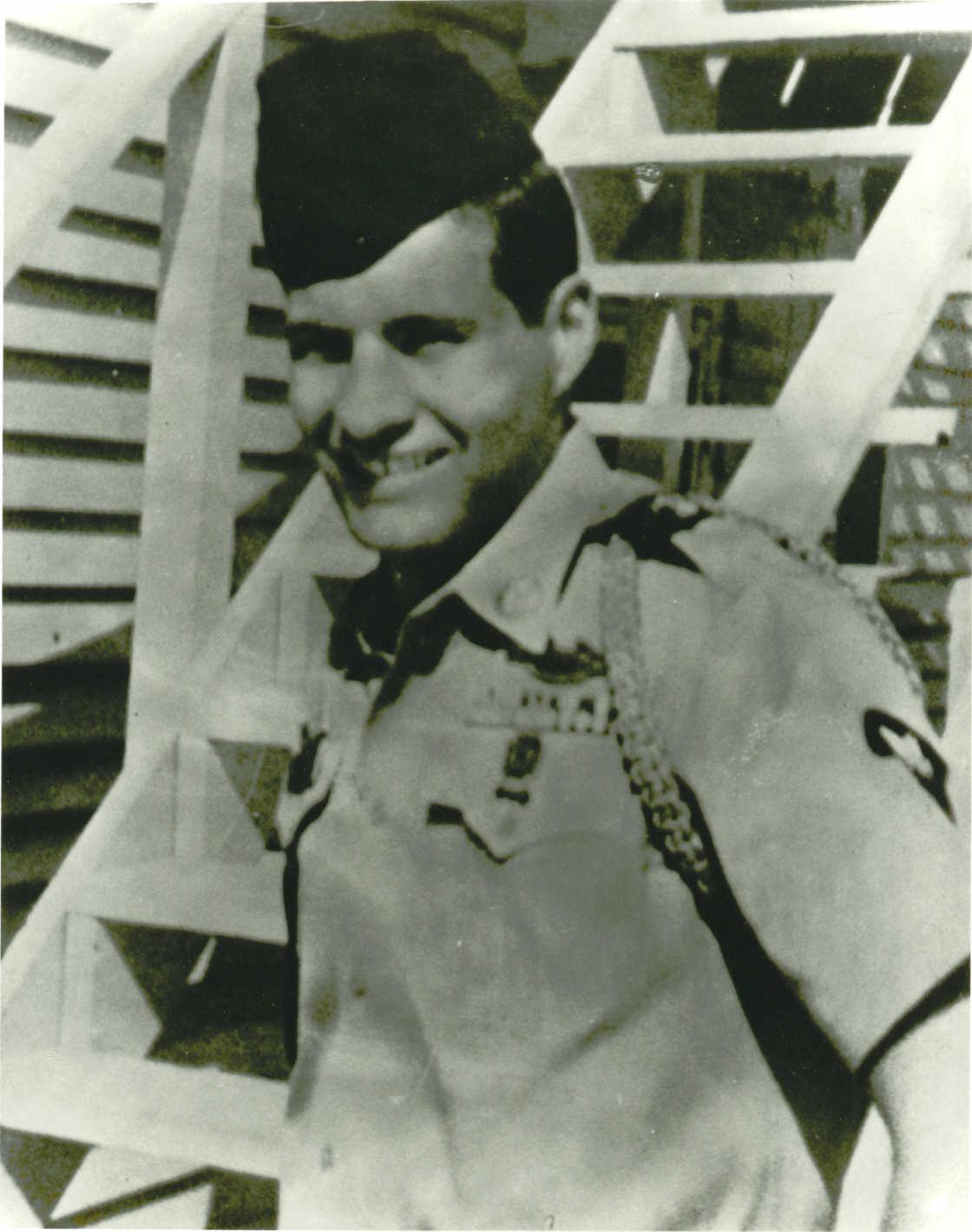
- Sergeant John Holcomb
- Born: June 11, 1946; Baker City, Oregon, U.S.
- Died: December 3, 1968 (aged 22) near Quản Lợi Base Camp, Binh Long Province, Republic of Vietnam
- Burial place: Eagle Valley Cemetery, Richland, Oregon
- Military career
- Allegiance: United States of America
- Branch: United States Army
- Service years: 1966–1968
- Rank: Sergeant
- Units: 7th Cavalry Regiment, 1st Cavalry Division
- Conflicts: Vietnam War: Operation Sheridan Sabre †
- Awards: Medal of Honor

John Noble Holcomb (June 11, 1946 – December 3, 1968) was a United States Army soldier and a recipient of the United States military's highest decoration—the Medal of Honor—for his actions in the Vietnam War.

== Biography ==
Holcomb was born in Baker, Oregon, the son of George Noble Holcomb and Wadean M. Rohner, and a descendant of Thomas Holcomb. He joined the Army from Corvallis, Oregon in 1966, and by December 3, 1968, was serving as a Sergeant in Company D, 2nd Battalion, 7th Cavalry Regiment, 1st Cavalry Division. During an enemy attack on that day, near Quản Lợi in the Republic of Vietnam during Operation Sheridan Sabre, Holcomb led his squad and later his platoon, after all other platoon leaders had been killed, in the defense of their position. Holcomb was mortally wounded during the battle and was posthumously awarded the Medal of Honor for his leadership.

Holcomb, aged 22 at his death, was buried in Eagle Valley Cemetery, Richland, Oregon.

== Medal of Honor citation ==
Sergeant Holcomb's official Medal of Honor citation reads:

For conspicuous gallantry and intrepidity in action at the risk of his life above and beyond the call of duty. Sgt. Holcomb distinguished himself while serving as a squad leader in Company D during a combat assault mission. Sgt. Holcomb's company assault had landed by helicopter and deployed into a hasty defensive position to organize for a reconnaissance-in-force mission when it was attacked from 3 sides by an estimated battalion-size enemy force. Sgt. Holcomb's squad was directly in the path of the main enemy attack. With complete disregard for the heavy fire, Sgt. Holcomb moved among his men giving encouragement and directing fire on the assaulting enemy. When his machine gunner was knocked out, Sgt. Holcomb seized the weapon, ran to a forward edge of the position, and placed withering fire on the enemy. His gallant actions caused the enemy to withdraw. Sgt. Holcomb treated and carried his wounded to a position of safety and reorganized his defensive sector despite a raging grass fire ignited by the incoming enemy mortar and rocket rounds. When the enemy assaulted the position a second time, Sgt. Holcomb again manned the forward machine gun, devastating the enemy attack and forcing the enemy to again break contact and withdraw. During the enemy withdrawal an enemy rocket hit Sgt. Holcomb's position, destroying his machine gun and severely wounding him. Despite his painful wounds, Sgt. Holcomb crawled through the grass fire and exploding mortar and rocket rounds to move the members of his squad, everyone of whom had been wounded, to more secure positions. Although grievously wounded and sustained solely by his indomitable will and courage, Sgt. Holcomb as the last surviving leader of his platoon organized his men to repel the enemy, crawled to the platoon radio and reported the third enemy assault on his position. His report brought friendly supporting fires on the charging enemy and broke the enemy attack. Sgt. Holcomb's inspiring leadership, fighting spirit, in action at the cost of his life were in keeping with the highest traditions of the military service and reflect great credit on himself, his unit, and the U.S. Army.

== See also ==
- List of Medal of Honor recipients
- List of Medal of Honor recipients for the Vietnam War
