= Minh Thạnh =

Minh Thạnh Xã Minh Thạnh Minh Hòa
- Commune
- Interactive map of Minh Thạnh
- Coordinates: 11°26′46″N 106°29′02″E
- Country: Vietnam
- Municipality: Ho Chi Minh City
- Established: June 16, 2025

Area
  - Total: 61.41 sq mi (159.06 km^{2})

Population (2024)
  - Total: 24,215
  - Density: 394.29/sq mi (152.24/km^{2})
- Time zone: UTC+07:00 (Indochina Time)
- Administrative code: 25780

Minh Thạnh (Vietnamese: Xã Minh Thạnh) is a commune of Ho Chi Minh City, Vietnam. It is one of the 168 new wards, communes and special zones of the city following the reorganization in 2025.

== History ==
Minh Thạnh was formerly a commune of An Lộc district, Bình Long province. It is located south of An Lộc and near Highway 13, in an area surrounded by other key military bases such as Quản Lợi, Chơn Thành and Lai Khê. Because of its strategic location along the corridor connecting Saigon to the Cambodian border, the area was used as a staging and base area for communist units and was the site of several search-and-destroy operations by U.S. forces. One of the most notable engagements nearby was the Battle of Minh Thanh Road in July 1966, when a U.S. armored column departing An Lộc was ambushed by Viet Cong forces operating from the surrounding plantation area.

On June 16, 2025, the National Assembly Standing Committee issued Resolution No. 1685/NQ-UBTVQH15 on the arrangement of commune-level administrative units of Ho Chi Minh City in 2025 (effective from June 16, 2025). Accordingly, the entire land area and population of Minh Hòa commune and part of Minh Tân, Minh Thạnh communes of the former Dầu Tiếng district will be integrated into a new commune named Minh Thạnh (Clause 147, Article 1).
