= Sidney Bryan Berry =

US Army general officer

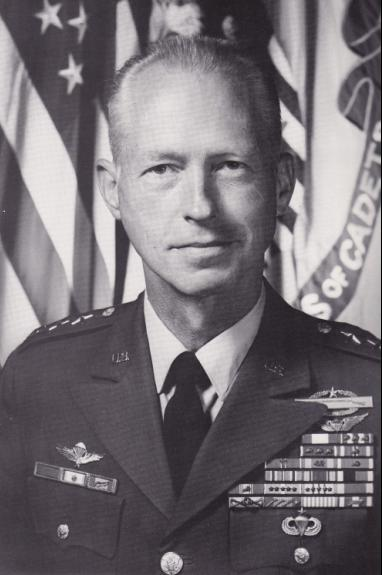
- LTG Sidney Bryan Berry
- Born: February 10, 1926; Hattiesburg, Mississippi, US
- Died: July 1, 2013 (aged 87) Kennett Square, Pennsylvania, US
- Allegiance: United States of America
- Branch: United States Army
- Service years: 1948–1980
- Rank: Lieutenant General
- Commands: A Company 1st Battalion 35th Infantry, Korea 1950–51, 1st Arm Rifle Battalion 54th Inf 4th Armor Div 1959–60, 1st Brigade 1st Div Republic of Viet Nam 1966–67, 101st Airborne Division, Assistant Division Commander, Republic of Viet Nam 1970–1971, 101st Airborne Div 197374, Superintendent, United States Military Academy, V Corps, US Army, Europe 1977–80.
- Conflicts: Korean War; Vietnam War
- Awards: Distinguished Service Medal (2); Silver Star (4); Legion of Merit (4); Distinguished Flying Cross (2); Bronze Star for Valor; Air Medal (42); Purple Heart (2); Combat Infantryman Badge (2)

Sidney Bryan Berry (February 10, 1926 – July 1, 2013) was a United States Army Lieutenant General, Superintendent of West Point (1974–1977), and Commissioner of Public Safety for the state of Mississippi (1980–1984).

== Early life and education ==
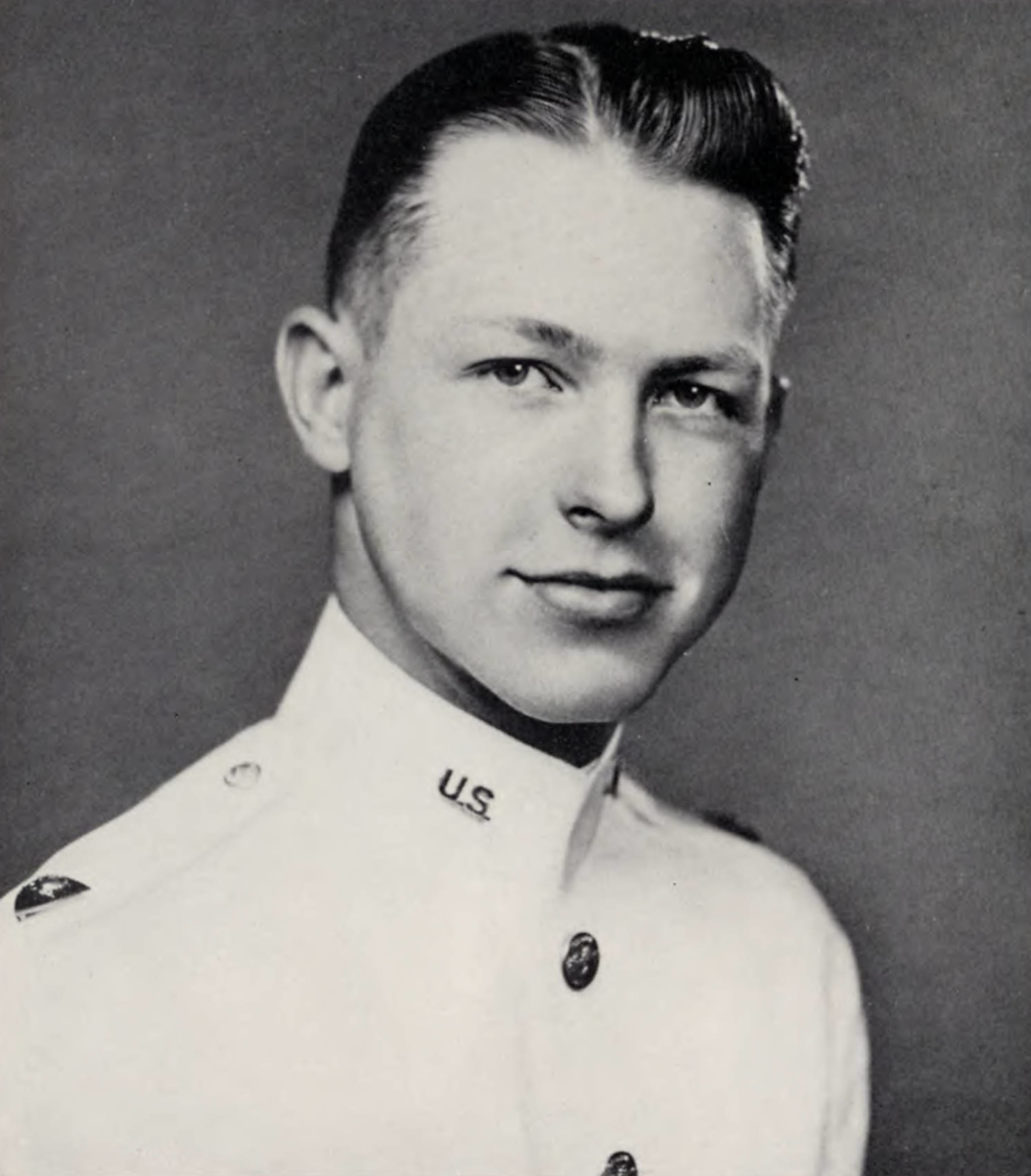
Berry as a United States Military Academy cadet c. 1948

Berry was born in Hattiesburg, Mississippi, on February 10, 1926. He received his appointment to the academy from Mississippi, graduating 160th in his class from West Point in 1948. He was commissioned a second lieutenant in the infantry branch, and assigned to his first unit in Japan in 1949.

== Military career ==
Berry's career spanned two wars. He first saw duty as a company commander in Korea. For service during the war in Korea, he was awarded two Silver Stars, a Bronze Star for Valor, a Purple Heart, and the Combat Infantryman Badge.

After duty in the Korean War, he earned a graduate degree from Columbia University (1951–1953). He then served as an instructor at West Point in the Department of Social Sciences (1953–1956). He was a military assistant to Secretary of Defense Robert McNamara (1961–1964), traveling to South Vietnam on multiple occasions. 1964–65, Berry was a student at the U.S. Army War College, in Carlisle Barracks, PA. He also served a year at the Council of Foreign Relations in New York City (1967–1968).

He would serve two and a half years in the Vietnam War between 1965 and 1971. His second combat wound occurred during his first tour (1965–1966) when he was serving as senior Military Assistance Command, Vietnam adviser to the Army of the Republic of Vietnam 7th Division. His awards for his service in South Vietnam included the Distinguished Service Medal, 2 Silver Stars, two Distinguished Flying Crosses, two Legions of Merit, the Purple Heart, 42 Air Medals, and a second Combat Infantryman Badge.

Berry became the 50th Superintendent of West Point in 1974. His time there would be trying, as he oversaw the integration of women in the summer of 1976 while at the same time dealing with a massive honor scandal involving cheating on an academic test involving the junior class. Following his tour as USMA Superintendent, Berry commanded the V Corps, US Army, Europe, from 1977 to 1980. He retired from active military service on 1 March 1980.

== Decorations ==
- Army Distinguished Service Medal with one oak leaf cluster
- Silver Star with three oak leaf clusters
- Legion of Merit with three oak leaf clusters
- Distinguished Flying Cross
- Bronze Star with Valor Device
- Air Medal with eight silver oak leaf clusters and one bronze oak leaf cluster
- Purple Heart with oak leaf cluster
- Combat Infantryman Badge with second award star

== Post military ==
Upon retirement from the military Berry served as Mississippi's Commissioner of Public Safety, 1980–1984. He then retired to Pennsylvania.

Berry died at a retirement home in Kennett Square, Pennsylvania, on July 1, 2013, of complications from Parkinson's disease. At his death he was 87 and was survived by his wife of 64 years, Anne; two daughters, a son and 12 grandchildren.

== Sources ==
- Atkinson, Rick (1999). The Long Gray Line. New York: MacMillan. ISBN 978-0805062915.
- Krueger, Dan (1975). Bugle Notes, 67th Vol. West Point, NY: United States Military Academy.

Military offices
Preceded by William Allen Knowlton	Superintendents of the United States Military Academy; 1974–1977	Succeeded by Andrew Jackson Goodpaster
