= Quản Lợi Base Camp =

Site information
- Type: Army Base

Location
- Coordinates: 11.674°N 106.663°E

Site history
- Built: 1967
- In use: 1967–72
- Battles/wars: Vietnam War; Battle of An Lộc

Garrison information
- Occupants: 1st Brigade, 1st Infantry Division; 11th Armored Cavalry Regiment; 3rd Brigade, 1st Cavalry Division; 5th Division

Quản Lợi Airfield
- IATA: none; ICAO: none

Summary
- Elevation AMSL: 508 ft (155 m)
- Interactive map of Quản Lợi Airfield

Runways
Direction	Length		Surface
Direction	ft	m	Surface
	3,900	1,189	laterite

Quản Lợi Base Camp (also known as LZ Andy or Rocket City) is a former U.S. Army and Army of the Republic of Vietnam (ARVN) base east of An Lộc, Binh Phuoc Province, in southern Vietnam.

== History ==
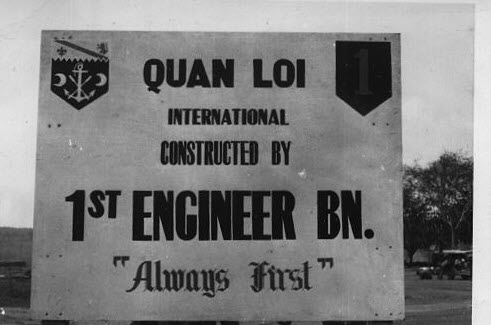
Sign erected by 1st Engineer Bn, 1967

=== 1967-71 ===
The base appears to have been initially used to support Operation Junction City in February–May 1967.

The base was established in 1967 on the site of a former French rubber plantation and was located approximately 6 km east of An Lộc in Bình Long Province.

The 1st Brigade, 1st Infantry Division comprising:

- 1st Battalion, 2nd Infantry Regiment
- 1st Battalion, 26th Infantry Regiment
- 1st Battalion, 28th Infantry Regiment

was based at Quản Lợi from March 1968 until August 1969.

The 1st Battalion, 5th Cavalry was based at Quản Lợi in April 1969.

In July 1969 the 11th Armored Cavalry Regiment moved to Quản Lợi and would remain here until September 1969. The regiment would be based here again from December 1969 to July 1970, during which time it participated in the Cambodian Incursion.

In February 1970 the 3rd Brigade, 1st Cavalry Division comprising:

- 1st Battalion, 5th Cavalry
- 1st Battalion, 7th Cavalry
- 2nd Battalion, 7th Cavalry
- 1st Battalion, 8th Cavalry
- 1st Battalion, 12th Cavalry

moved to Quản Lợi and would stay here until August 1970. The 3rd Brigade would participate in the Cambodian Incursion.

Other units stationed at Quản Lợi included:

- Battery F, 16th Artillery (October 1969-January 1970)
- 1st Battalion, 21st Artillery (1967-1968)
- 6th Battalion, 27th Artillery (January 1968-March 1970)
- 1st Squadron, 9th Cavalry

=== 1972-5 ===
The ARVN took over the base and at the start of the Battle of An Lộc in April 1972 it was defended by a battalion of the 7th Regiment, 5th Division and was also the base for the 9th Regiment. A combined 105mm and 155mm artillery battery was also based at Quản Lợi. On the evening of 7 April elements of the People's Army of Vietnam (PAVN/VC) 9th Division overran Quản Lợi, the 7th Regiment was ordered to destroy their heavy equipment and fall back to An Lộc. Once captured the PAVN/VC used Quản Lợi as a staging base for units coming in from Cambodia to join the siege of An Lộc and key members of COSVN were based there to oversee the battle.

On 8 August the ARVN 18th Division launched an assault to retake Quản Lợi but were stopped by the PAVN/VC in the base's reinforced concrete bunkers. A further attack was launched on 9 August with limited gains and attacks on the base continued for the next 2 weeks eventually gaining one third of the base. The ARVN finally attacked the PAVN/VC occupied bunkers with TOW missiles and M-202 rockets and this broke the PAVN/VC defense forcing the remaining defenders to flee the base.

== Current use ==
The base is largely overgrown but a small area appears to remain in use by the PAVN.

In November 2022 Bình Phước Province announced plans to redevelop the Quản Lợi military airport into a 350-hectare special-purpose airport.
