= Calvary Cemetery (Queens) =

Cemetery in Queens, New York City

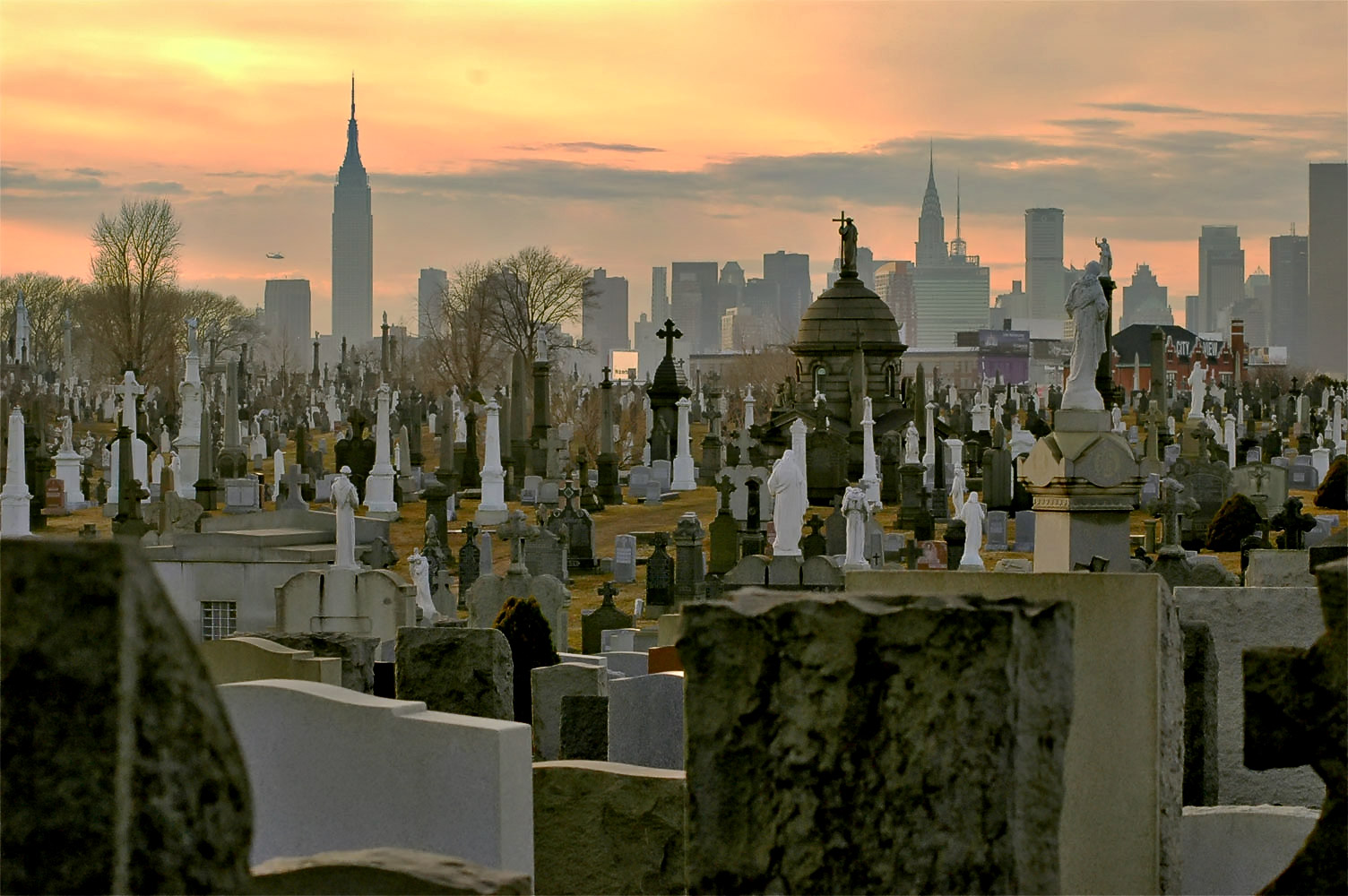
- The cemetery c. 2006, with the Manhattan skyline behind it
- Interactive map of Calvary Cemetery

Details
- Established: 1848
- Location: Sunnyside, Woodside, and Maspeth, Queens, New York City
- Country: U.S.
- Coordinates: 40°44′6″N 73°55′3″W
- Type: Catholic Cemetery
- Owned by: The Archdiocese of New York
- No. of interments: ≈ 3 million
- Website: www.calvarycemeteryqueens.com
- Find a Grave: 64107

Calvary Cemetery is a Catholic cemetery in Sunnyside, Maspeth, and Woodside, Queens, in New York City, United States. With about three million burials, it has the largest number of interments of any cemetery in the United States. Established in 1848, Calvary Cemetery covers 365 acres (148 ha) and is owned by the Archdiocese of New York and managed by the Trustees of St. Patrick's Cathedral.

Calvary Cemetery is divided into four sections, spread across the neighborhoods of Sunnyside, Maspeth and Woodside. The oldest, First Calvary, is also called "Old Calvary". The Second, Third and Fourth sections to the east are all considered part of "New Calvary".

== History ==
=== Establishment ===
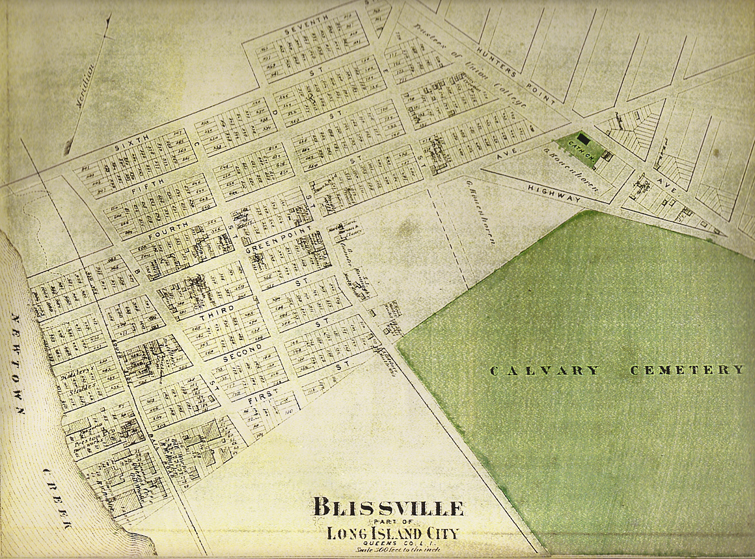
Map of Blissville from 1873, showing Calvary Cemetery, from the Greater Astoria Historical Society

In 1817, the Trustees of Old St. Patrick's Cathedral on Mott Street, Manhattan, realized that their original cemetery on Mulberry Street was almost full. In 1847, faced with cholera epidemics and a shortage of burial grounds in Manhattan, the New York State Legislature passed the Rural Cemetery Act authorizing nonprofit corporations to operate commercial cemeteries. On October 29, 1845 Old St. Patrick's Cathedral trustees had purchased 71 acres (29 ha) of land from John McMenoy and John McNolte in Maspeth and this land was used to develop Calvary Cemetery. The cemetery was named after Mount Calvary, where Jesus Christ was crucified according to the New Testament.

The first Calvary Cemetery burial occurred on July 31, 1848. The name of the deceased was Esther Ennis, who reportedly "died of a broken heart." The cemetery was consecrated by Archbishop John Hughes in August 1848.

=== Operation ===
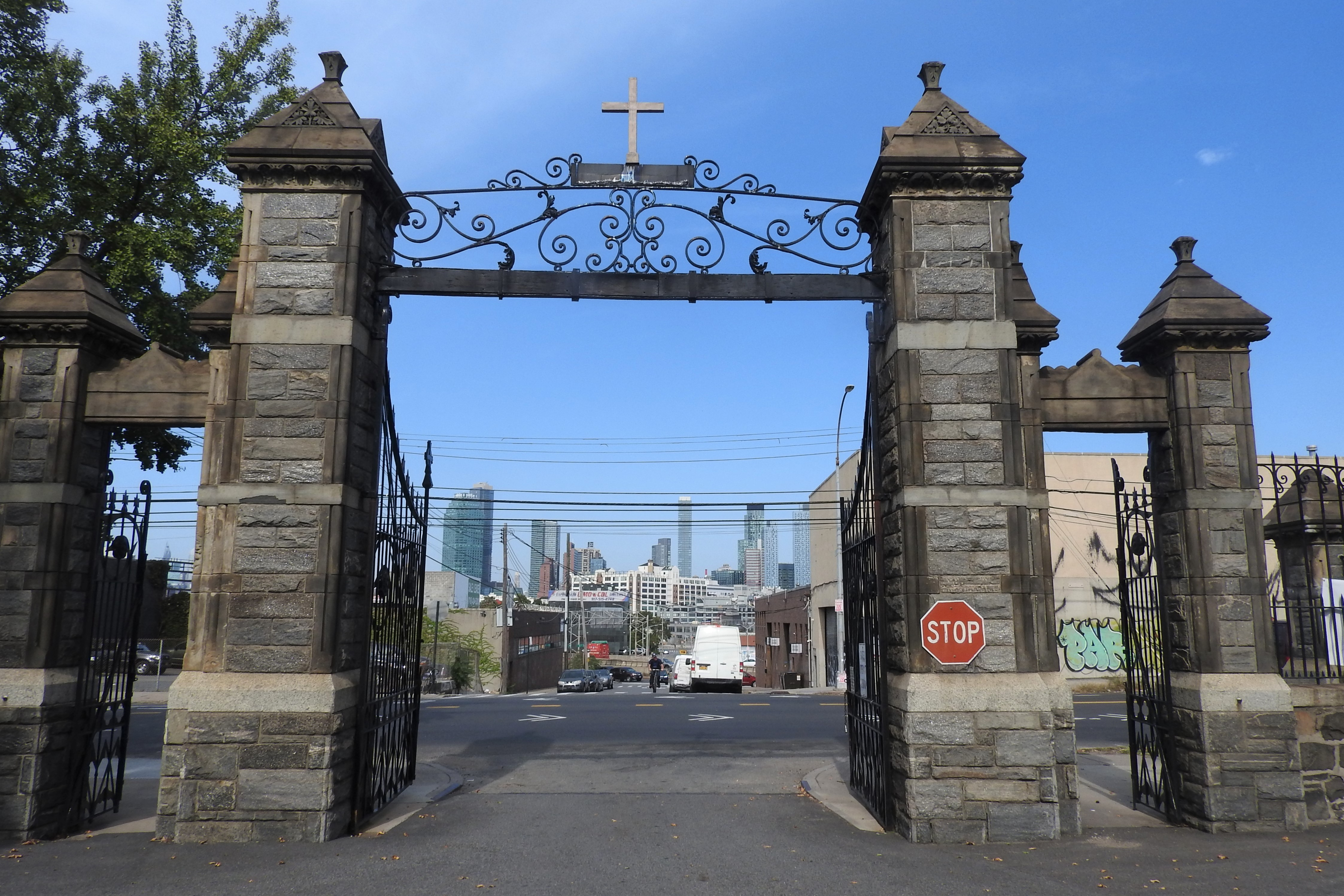
Blissville gate of Old Calvary

By 1852 there were 50 burials a day, half of them poor Irish under seven years of age. In the early 20th century, influenza and tuberculosis epidemics caused a shortage of gravediggers, and people dug graves for their own loved ones. The entire number of interments from the cemetery's opening in August 1848 until January 1898, was 644,761. From January 1898 until 1907 there were about 200,000 interments, thus yielding roughly 850,000 interments at Calvary Cemetery by 1907.

Calvary was accessible by ferryboats crossing the East River from 23rd Street in Manhattan. It cost an adult seven dollars to be buried there. Burial of children under age seven cost three dollars; children aged seven to fourteen cost five dollars. As development in Manhattan's East Village expanded, bodies buried in that neighborhood were transferred to Queens. In 1854, ferry service opened by 10th Street and the East River.

The original division of the cemetery, now known as First Calvary or Old Calvary, was filled by 1867. The Archdiocese of New York expanded the area of the cemetery, adding more sections, and by the 1990s there were nearly 3 million burials in Calvary Cemetery. The Cemetery continues to add plots and burial spaces can be purchased in advance.

In 1949, several hundred workers at the cemetery went on strike.

== Description ==
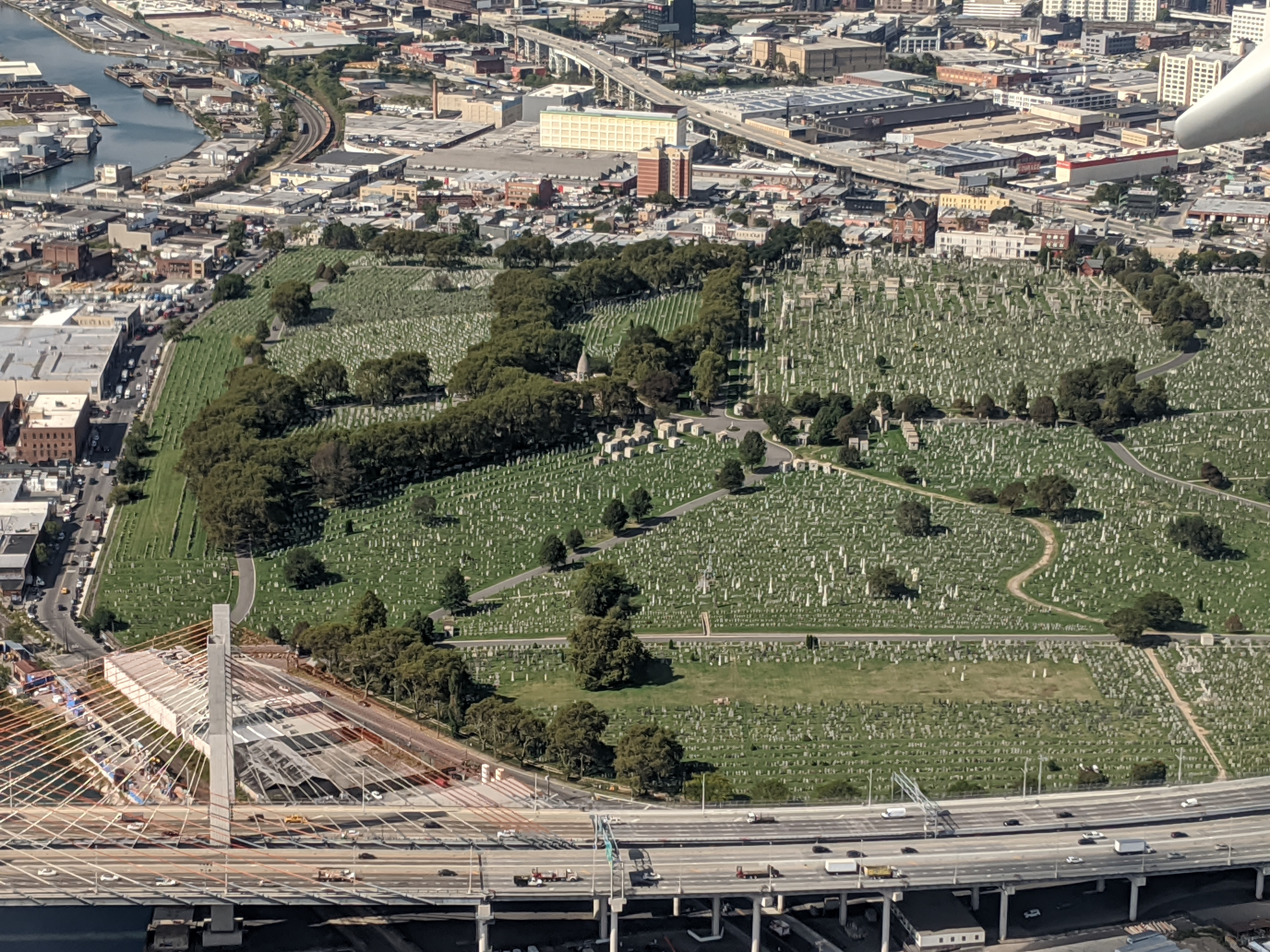
Aerial view of First Calvary in 2020

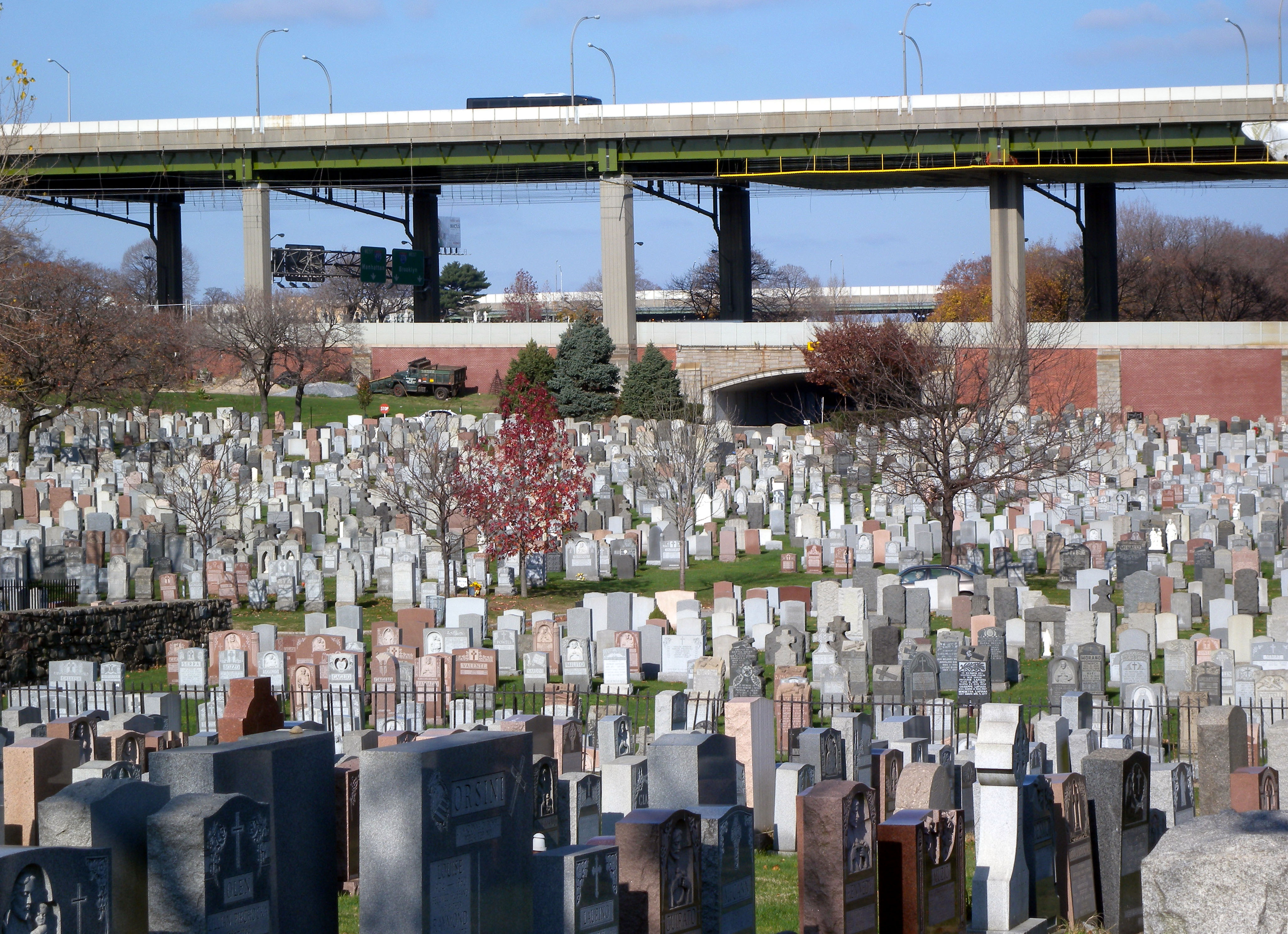
Fourth Calvary with the double-decked Long Island Expressway in 2009

Calvary is split into four sections. The first section is known as First Calvary or Old Calvary, and is located to the west of the section of the Brooklyn–Queens Expressway (I-278) that runs between the Long Island Expressway (I-495) interchange and Newtown Creek. The others are known collectively as New Calvary, and as a group to the east of the above-mentioned section of the Brooklyn–Queens Expressway.

1. First Calvary Cemetery is bounded by the Brooklyn–Queens Expressway, Review Ave and 37th Street.
2. Second Calvary Cemetery is in-between the Long Island and Brooklyn–Queens Expressways, and also bounded by 48th Street and 58th Street. The cemetery's offices are located here, at 49–02 Laurel Hill Boulevard.
3. Third Calvary Cemetery is north of the Brooklyn–Queens Expressway, and also bounded by Queens Boulevard, 49th Street and 58th Street.
4. Fourth Calvary Cemetery is south of the Long Island Expressway, and also bounded by 55th Avenue, 50th Street and 58th Street.

The cemetery's chapel is named for St. Callixtus and was designed by Raymond F. Almirall. Originally a frame structure, it was rebuilt using limestone in 1908.

=== Calvary Veterans Park ===
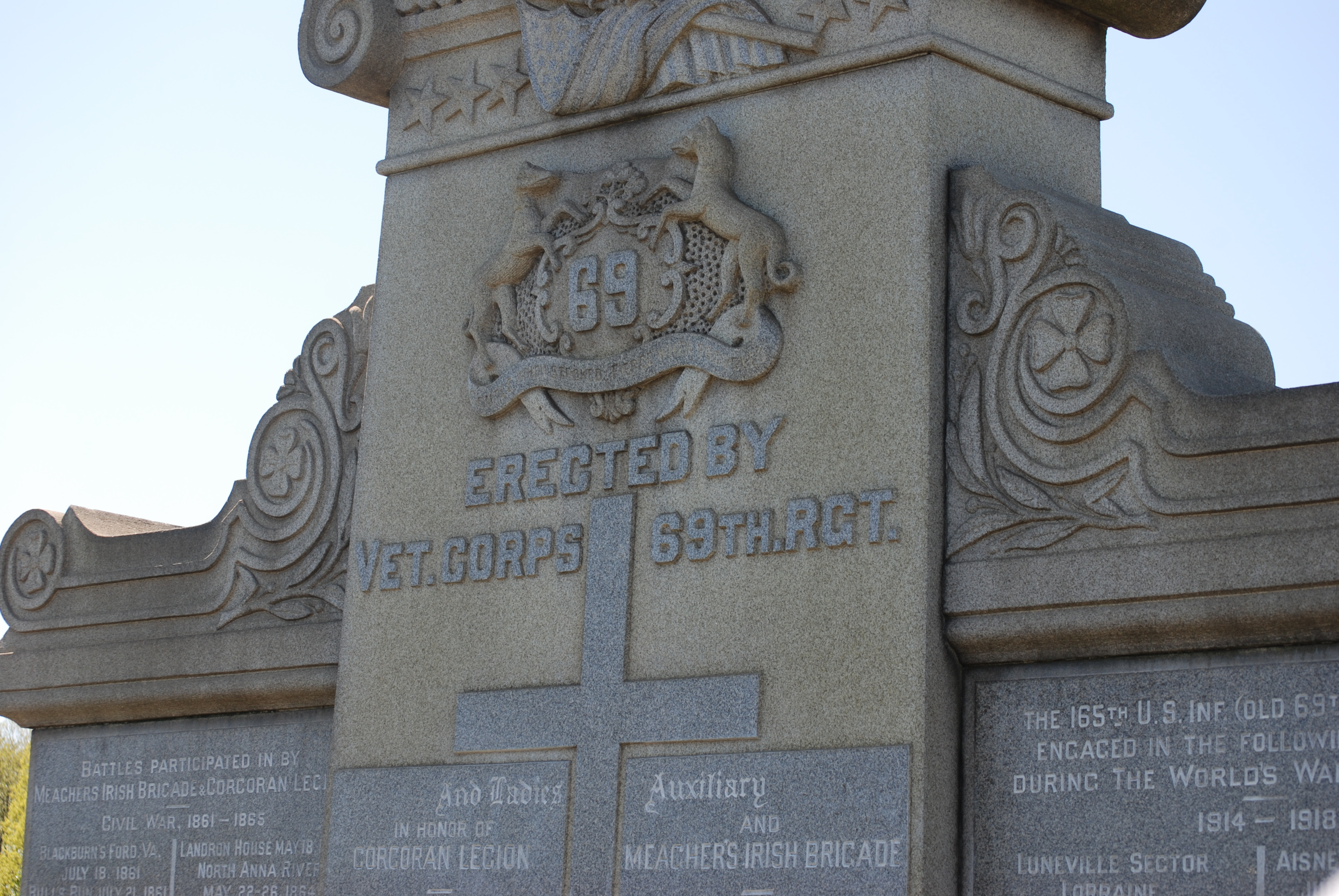
69th Regiment monument

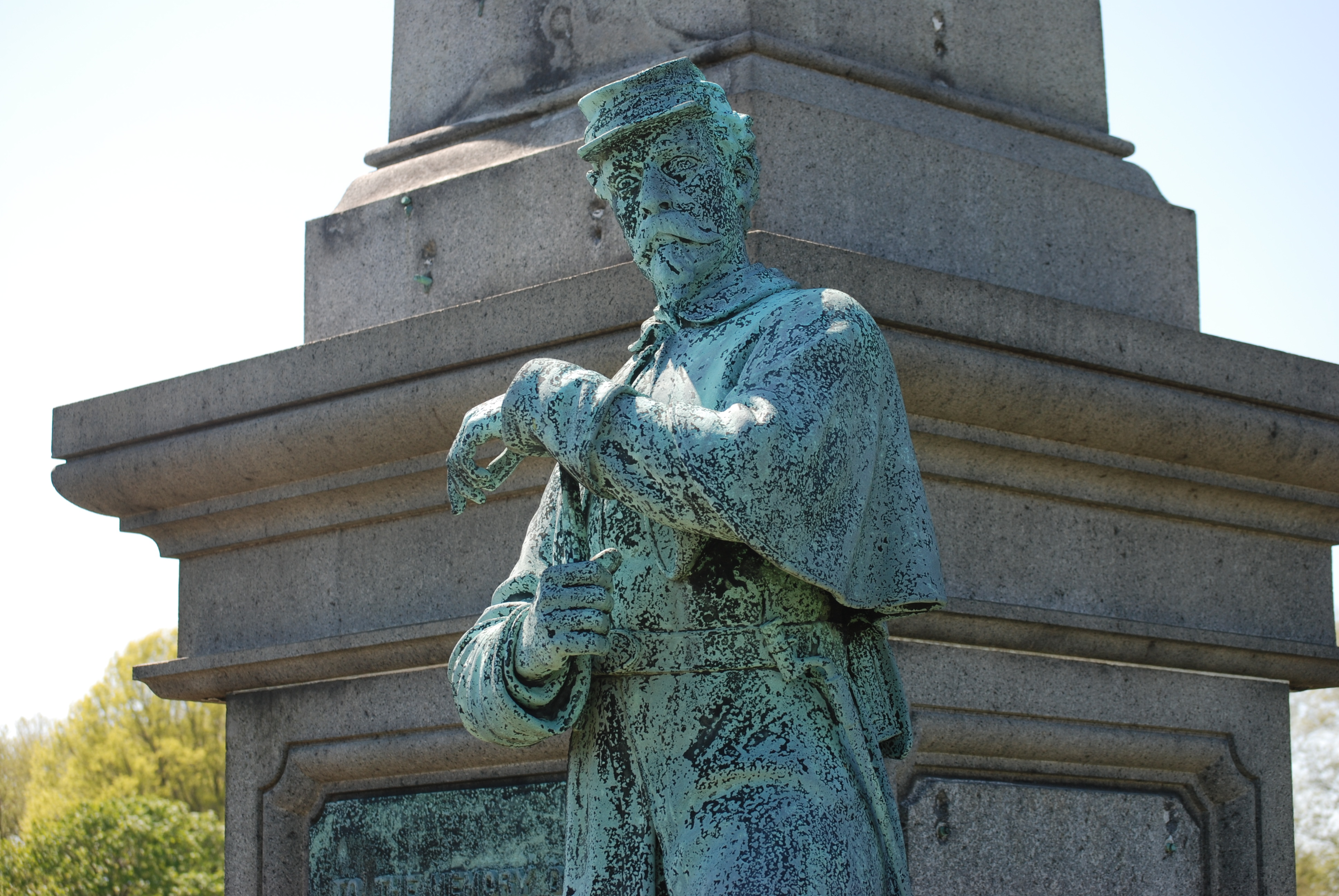
Statue of a Union soldier

A small part of the Old Calvary section of the cemetery is a city-owned public park that serves as a burial ground, the Calvary Veterans Park. It was purchased by the City of New York from the Trustees of St. Patrick's Cathedral in 1863, for use as a burial ground for Union soldiers who died in New York hospitals. Twenty-one soldiers were ultimately buried there, with the final burial occurring in 1909.

The Calvary Monument in the park, erected in 1866, originally with bronze sculptures is located in the park. The monument honors the 69th Regiment. It is by Daniel Draddy, one of the Draddy Brothers, who sculpted the obelisk to William James MacNeven. There is no signage from either entrance, nor any mention on the official web site's maps. It is located at 40.7309°N 73.9298°W. The monument was last renovated in 1929. A conservation effort was initiated in 2009, but as of 2022 is not done.

== Notable burials ==
=== Entertainers ===
- Tony Bennett (1926–2023), singer
- Nancy Carroll (1903–1965), actress
- Ferruccio Corradetti (1867–1939), opera singer
- Dom DeLuise (1933–2009), actor
- Tess Gardella (1894–1950), actress who played Aunt Jemima
- Patrick Gilmore (1829–1882), "Father of the American Band"
- Texas Guinan (1884–1933), actress and saloon-keeper
- Robert Harron (1893–1920), actor – "Second Calvary"
- James Hayden (1953–1983), actor
- Joseph E. Howard (1878–1961), American composer ("Emerson and Howard")
- Patsy Kelly (1910–1981), actress
- James Murray (1901–1936), actor
- Nita Naldi (1894–1961), actress
- Arthur O'Connell (1908–1981), actor
- Una O'Connor (1880–1959), actress
- Edward Le Roy Rice (1871–1938), producer of minstrel shows
- William J. Scanlan (1856–1898), singer
- Wini Shaw (1907–1982), actress
- Joe Spinell (1936–1989), actor
- Bert Wheeler (1895–1968), comedian
- Ti Manno (1953–1985), Haitian singer, guitar player, keyboard player, and percussionist
- Tony Sirico (1942–2022), actor

=== Law enforcement professionals ===
- Irma Lozada (1959–1984 †) a.k.a. "Fran," was a member of the New York City Transit Police who was slain in 1984, becoming the first female police officer to die in the line of duty in New York City.
- Joseph Petrosino (1860–1909), NYPD's first commanding officer of the "Black Hand Squad" (aka Italian Squad), a precursor to the NYPD's Bomb Squad, who investigated the Italian Mafia who used explosives to shake down businesses in NYC. Detective Lieutenant Petrosino, an Italian-American, was the first NYPD officer killed overseas in the "line of duty", while investigating organized crime in Italy. Subject of the film Pay or Die.
- Mary A. Sullivan (1878/1879–1950), first woman in NYPD to be a homicide detective, lieutenant and first grade detective. Founded the Policewoman's Endowment Association.

=== Military figures ===
- Edward Brown, Jr. (1841–1911), American Civil War Medal of Honor recipient
- Thomas Burke (1842–1902), American Civil War Medal of Honor recipient
- Richard Byrnes (1833–1864 †), American Civil War officer and commander of the Irish Brigade
- Dennis Conlan (1838–1870), American Civil War Medal of Honor recipient
- William C. Connor (1832–1912), American Civil War Medal of Honor recipient
- Michael Corcoran (1827–1863), American Civil War officer and commander of the 69th New York Irish Volunteers
- Thomas E. Corcoran (1838–1904), American Civil War Medal of Honor recipient
- William J. Creelman (1874–1928), Peacetime Medal of Honor recipient
- Cornelius Cronin (1838–1912), American Civil War Medal of Honor recipient
- Michael Doheny (1805–1863), Irish barrister, Young Irelander rebel leader, Fenian organizer and writer
- John Donnelly (1839–1895), American Civil War Medal of Honor recipient
- Patrick H. Doody (1840–1924), American Civil War Medal of Honor recipient
- George W. Ford (1844–1883), American Civil War Medal of Honor recipient
- Patrick Ginley (1822–1917), American Civil War Medal of Honor recipient
- Francis J. Herron (1837–1902), American Civil War general and Medal of Honor recipient
- Patrick Kelly (d. 1864 †), American Civil War officer and commander of the Irish Brigade
- Samuel W. Kinnaird (1843–1923), American Civil War Medal of Honor recipient
- Franz Kramer (1865–1924), Spanish–American War Medal of Honor recipient
- William McNamara (1835–1912), American Indian Wars Medal of Honor recipient
- James H. Morgan (1840–1877), American Civil War Medal of Honor recipient
- Charles J. Murphy (1832–1921), American Civil War Medal of Honor recipient
- John McLeod Murphy (1827–1871), American Civil War Army and Navy officer, and State Senator
- Thomas P. Noonan, Jr. (1943–1969 †) Vietnam War Medal of Honor recipient
- John Francis O'Sullivan (1850–1907), American Indian Wars Medal of Honor recipient
- James Quinlan (1833–1906), American Civil War Medal of Honor recipient
- Eliakim P. Scammon (1816–1894), American Civil War brigadier general
- Robert Augustus Sweeney (1853–1890), two-time Medal of Honor recipient
- Henry A. Thompson (1841–1889), American Civil War Medal of Honor recipient
- Hermann Ziegner (1864–1898), American Indian Wars Medal of Honor recipient

=== Organized crime figures ===
- Vito Bonventre (1875–1930), mobster
- Anthony Carfano (1898–1959), mobster aka "Little Augie Pisano"
- John "Johnny" Dolan (c. 1850–1876), executed for the murder of merchant James H. Noe; described (possibly inaccurately) as "Dandy" Johnny Dolan and the head of the Whyos street gang by Herbert Asbury in his book The Gangs of New York
- Natale "Joe Diamond" Evola (1907–1973)
- Stefano "Steve" Ferrigno (1900–1930)
- Giosue Gallucci (1864–1915)
- Paul Kelly (criminal) (1876–1936), mobster
- Joseph Lanza (1904–1968), racketeer; mobster
- Thomas Lucchese (1899–1967), mobster
- Ignatius "Lupo the Wolf" Lupo (1877–1947)
- Joe Masseria (1879–1931) – 1st Calvary
- Peter "Giuseppe" Morello (also known as the Clutch Hand) (1870–1930), the first head of the Morello crime family; now lies in a bare, forgotten grave
- Dominick "Sonny Black" Napolitano (1930–1981), mobster
- Bonaventura "Joseph" Pinzolo (1887–1930)
- Benjamin "Lefty" Ruggiero (1926–1994)
- Michael "Mickey" Spillane (1934–1977), mobster
- Ciro "the Artichoke King" Terranova (1888–1938)
- Nicolo Terranova (1890–1916)
- Vincenzo "Vincent" Terranova (1886–1922)

=== Politicians ===
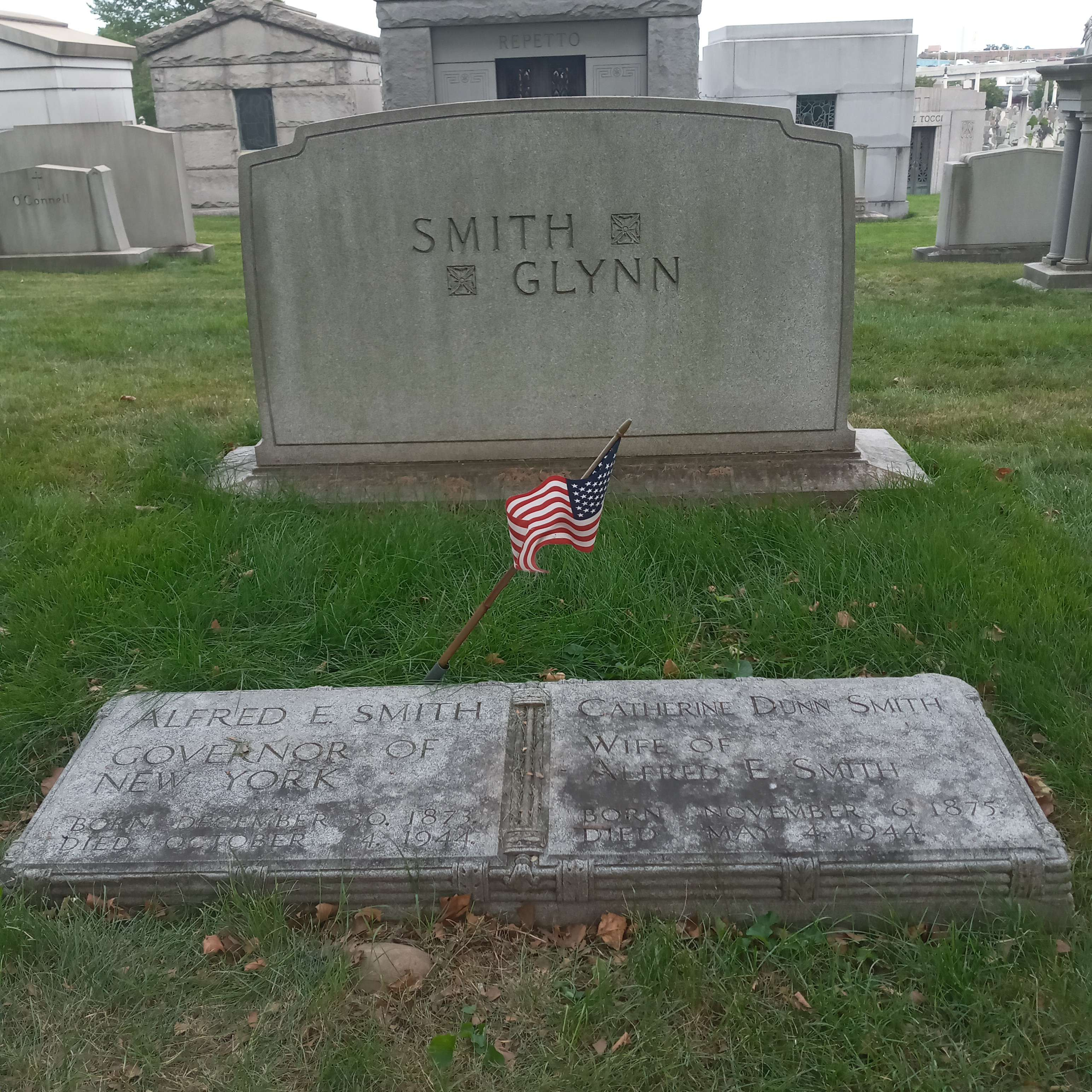
Grave of Al Smith

- Vincent H. Auleta (1886–1961), lawyer, assemblyman
- Stephen J. Colahan (1841–1874), lawyer, assemblyman
- James O'Brien (1841–1907) – New York City alderman (1864, 1866), Sheriff of New York County (1867), New York State Senator (1872–1873), and U.S. Representative from New York (1879–1881)
- William G. Carroll (1893–1969) – New York State Assemblyman
- Lawrence V. Cullen, J.D., USMC (1948–2012), Justice New York State Court of Claims (appointed by Gov. George Pataki), elected New York State Supreme Court, 11th Judicial District – 1st (Old Calvary – St. Callixtus)
- Thomas F. Denney (1874–1913), member of the New York State Assembly
- Carmine DeSapio (1908–2004), last head of the Tammany Hall political machine
- John E. Develin (1820–1888), lawyer, assemblyman
- Sylvester A. Dineen (1898–1950), member of the New York State Assembly
- Daniel Direnzo (1886–1933), Assistant District Attorney of New York City, Head of Court of Special Sessions
- Thomas J. Dunn (1849–1905), Sheriff of New York County (1897–1899)
- John Fox (1835–1914), U.S. Representative from New York and member of the New York City Council
- Patrick Jerome "Battle-Axe" Gleason (1844–1901) last mayor of Long Island City
- Hugh J. Grant (1857–1910), mayor of New York City
- Martin J. Kennedy (1892–1955) U.S. Representative in Congress (1930–1945) and New York State Senator (1924–1930)
- Thomas A. Ledwith, (1840–1898) New York State Assemblyman and State Senator
- Charles Francis Murphy (1858–1924), head of New York City's Tammany Hall
- Charles Novello (1886–1935), lawyer, assemblyman, alderman
- George Washington Plunkitt (1842–1924), Tammany Hall politician – unmarked grave
- James A. Rierdon (1854–1911), assemblyman
- Jere F. Ryan (1882–1948), member of the New York State Assembly and Commissioner of Public Markets
- Alfred E. Smith (1873–1944), Governor of New York State and 1928 U.S. presidential candidate
- Timothy Sullivan (1862–1913), U.S. Representative in Congress (1903–1906; 1912), long-term member of New York State Legislature and sponsor of the Sullivan Act
- Robert F. Wagner (1877–1953), U.S. Senator from New York State
- Robert F. Wagner Jr. (1910–1991), 102nd Mayor of New York City
- Robert Wagner III (1944–1993), president of the New York City Board of Education, son of Mayor Robert Wagner, Jr. and grandson of Senator Robert F. Wagner

=== Sportspeople ===
- Willie Keeler (1872–1923), Hall of Fame baseball player
- Phil O'Sullivan (1895–1952), Gaelic footballer
- Jim Shanley (1854–1904), baseball player
- Martin Sheridan (1881–1918), four-time Olympic gold medalist in the discus and shot put
- Mickey Welch (1859–1941), Hall of Fame baseball player

=== Writers ===
- Mary Letitia Martin (1815–1850), heiress, novelist
- Claude McKay (1890–1948), poet, journalist, novelist
- Lorenzo Da Ponte (1749-1838), librettist, poet

=== Others ===
- James W. Blake (1862–1935), part-time song lyricist who wrote the words to The Sidewalks of New York
- Steve Brodie (1863–1901), Brooklyn bookmaker, claimed to survive Brooklyn Bridge jump
- William R. Cosentini (1911–1954), mechanical engineer and founder of Cosentini Associates
- Francis E. Dec Polish-American disbarred lawyer and outsider writer
- Luigi Fugazy (1837–1930), Italian American banker and businessman
- Julia Grant (1873–1944), philanthropist
- Philip Martiny (1858–1927), sculptor
- Edward McGlynn (1837–1900), reformist Catholic priest
- Adolfo Müller-Ury (1862–1947), portrait artist
- John Mulvany (c. 1844–1906), artist
- Annie Moore Schayer (1874–1924), first person to be processed through Ellis Island
- Eugenie Baclini (1909–1912), second RMS Titanic survivor to die after the sinking – solitary, unmarked grave
- S. Joseph Barry, (1933–2019), professor emeritus of audiology and speech, Section 1W
- Anna Frances Levins (1876–1941), Irish American photographer, publisher, activist
- Etienne Aigner, (1904–2000), Érsekújvár, Austria-Hungary born designer of handbags and leather goods
- Joseph Medaglia (1933–1993), Franciscan priest, and actor; he portrayed Father Carmelo, in The Godfather

== See also ==
- List of United States cemeteries
