= Bill O'Connor =

Bill O'Connor may refer to:

- Bill O'Connor (American football), American football end, active 1948–1953
- Bill O'Connor (Australian footballer) (1908–1989), Australian rules footballer for South Melbourne
- Bill O'Connor (basketball), American basketball coach
- Bill O'Connor (comics), comics writer, see Atom
- Bill O'Connor (mountaineer and writer), see Cholatse
- Bill O'Connor (musician), country music performer at National Barn Dance
- Bill O'Connor (racing driver), see Camping World Grand Prix at The Glen and 1983 Formula Atlantic season
- Bill O'Connor (ice hockey), see 2006 World Junior A Challenge

== See also ==
- Billy O'Connor, musician
- William O'Connor (disambiguation)
