= Saturday Date with Billy O'Connor =

Canadian variety show

- Genre: Variety show
- Written by: Pat Patterson
- Presented by: Don Parrish
- Starring: Billy O'Connor
- Country of origin: Canada
- Original language: English
- No. of seasons: 1

Production
- Producer: Drew Crossan
- Running time: 30 minutes

Original release
- Network: CBC Television
- Release: 4 October 1958 – 27 June 1959

Saturday Date with Billy O'Connor is a Canadian variety show which aired on CBC Television from 1958 to 1959.

== Premise ==
Billy O'Connor, a musician who previously hosted CBC programs such as The Billy O'Connor Show and Club O'Connor, was seen in this program with performers Allan Blye and Vanda King. The house band was a quartet featuring an accordionist (Vic Centro), a bassist (Jackie Richardson), a drummer (Doug McLeod) and a guitarist (Kenny Gill).

== Scheduling ==
This half-hour program was broadcast on Saturdays at 7:30 p.m. (Eastern time) from 4 October 1958 to 27 June 1959, prior to the hockey broadcast during the National Hockey League season.
