= John F. Carew =

American politician

John Francis Carew
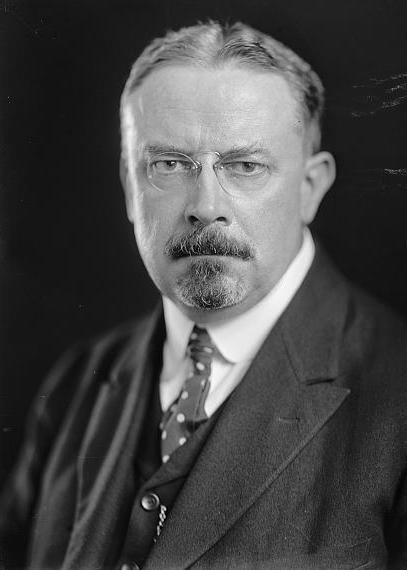

Member of the U.S. House of Representatives from New York
- In office March 4, 1913 – December 28, 1929
- Preceded by: Henry George, Jr.
- Succeeded by: Martin J. Kennedy
- Constituency: 17th district (1913–19); 18th district (1919–29)

Member of the New York State Assembly from the New York County, 24th district
- In office January 1, 1904 – December 31, 1904
- Preceded by: Leo P. Ulmann
- Succeeded by: James J. Nugent

Personal details
- Born: April 16, 1873 Brooklyn, New York
- Died: April 10, 1951 (aged 77) Rockville Centre, New York
- Party: Democratic Party
- Education: Columbia College; Columbia Law School
- Occupation: Attorney, Judge

John Francis Carew (April 16, 1873 – April 10, 1951) was an American lawyer and politician who served eight terms as a U.S. representative from New York from 1913 to 1929. He was a nephew of Thomas Francis Magner.

== Biography ==
Born in Williamsburg, Brooklyn, New York, Carew attended the public schools of Brooklyn and New York City and the College of the City of New York. He graduated from Columbia College in 1893 and from Columbia Law School in New York City in 1896. He was admitted to the bar in 1897 and thereafter practiced law in New York City. Carew was a member of the New York State Assembly (New York Co., 24th D.) in 1904. He was a delegate to the Democratic State Conventions held from 1912 to 1924, and a delegate to the 1912 and 1924 Democratic National Conventions.

=== Tenure in Congress ===
Carew was elected as a Democrat to the Sixty-third and to the eight succeeding Congresses, holding office from March 4, 1913, until his resignation on December 28, 1929, having been appointed a justice of the New York Supreme Court.

=== Judicial career ===
He was subsequently elected to a fourteen-year term on that court in November 1930, and served until December 31, 1943, when he reached the constitutional age limit. Thereafter, he served as an official referee for the court. Carew is best remembered as the judge who presided over the trial for custody of 10-year-old Gloria Vanderbilt in 1934.

=== Death ===
Carew died in Rockville Centre, New York, on April 10, 1951, and was interred in Calvary Cemetery, Queens, New York.

New York State Assembly
Preceded by Leo P. Ulmann	New York State Assembly; New York County, 24th District; 1904	Succeeded by James J. Nugent
U.S. House of Representatives
Preceded by Henry George, Jr.	Member of the U.S. House of Representatives from New York's 17th congressional district 1913–1919	Succeeded by Herbert Pell
Preceded by George B. Francis	Member of the U.S. House of Representatives from New York's 18th congressional district 1919–1929	Succeeded by Martin J. Kennedy
