= William Connor (disambiguation) =

William Connor may refer to:

- William Connor (1909–1967), British journalist
- William D. Connor (1864–1944), American politician, Lieutenant-Governor of Wisconsin
- William C. Connor (born 1832), Irish soldier and Medal of Honor recipient
- William Connor (gymnast) (1869–1964), British Olympic gymnast
- William Herbert Connor (born 1895), Canadian salesman and political figure in Ontario
- William Connor, a character from Twilight Zone: The Movie
- William Durward Connor (1874–1960), U.S. Army general
- William E. Connor II, American-born, Hong Kong–based businessman and car collector
- Bill Connor (American football) (1899–1980), American football player
- Bill Connor (trade unionist) (born 1941), British trade unionist and politician

== See also ==
- William Conner (disambiguation)
- William O'Connor (disambiguation)
- William Connors (disambiguation)
