= William O'Connor =

William O'Connor may refer to:

- William O'Connor (fencer) (1864–1939), American fencer
- William O'Connor (Australian politician) (1910–1987)
- William O'Connor (darts player) (born 1986), Irish darts player
- William Aloysius O'Connor (1903–1983), American prelate of the Roman Catholic Church
- William D. O'Connor (1832–1889), American author
- William Patrick O'Connor (1886–1973), American clergyman of the Roman Catholic Church
- William Joseph O'Connor (1862–1892), Canadian professional rower - single sculls
- Willie O'Connor (born 1967), Irish hurler
- William O'Connor (artist) (1970–2018), American game artist

== See also ==
- Bill O'Connor (disambiguation)
- Billy O'Connor, musician
- William Connor (disambiguation)
