= James Quinlan =

James Joseph Quinlan
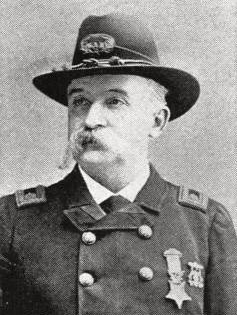
- James J. Quinlan, postwar
- Born: September 13, 1833; Clonmel, County Tipperary, Ireland
- Died: August 29, 1906 (aged 72); Queens, New York, US
- Burial place: Calvary Cemetery (Queens, New York)
- Military career
- Allegiance: United States of America; Union
- Branch: United States Army; Union Army
- Service years: 1861 - 1863
- Rank: Lieutenant Colonel
- Unit: (New York (state)) 88th New York Infantry
- Conflicts: American Civil War Battle of Savage's Station
- Awards: Medal of Honor

James Joseph Quinlan (September 13, 1833 – August 29, 1906) was a Union Army officer during the American Civil War and a recipient of America's highest military decoration—the Medal of Honor—for his actions at the Battle of Savage's Station.

Quinlan, was appointed as major of the 88th New York Infantry in December 1861. He became the regiment's lieutenant colonel in October 1862, and was discharged in February 1863.

After the war, he became a companion of the New York Commandery of the Military Order of the Loyal Legion of the United States.

Quinlan was buried at Calvary Cemetery, Woodside, Queens County, New York.

== Medal of Honor citation ==

Rank and Organization:

Rank and organization: Major, 88th New York Infantry. Place and date: At Savage Station, Va., June 29, 1862. Entered service at: New York, N.Y. Born: September 13, 1833, Ireland. Date of issue: February 18, 1891.

Citation:

Led his regiment on the enemy's battery, silenced the guns, held the position against overwhelming numbers, and covered the retreat of the 2d Army Corps.

== See also ==
- List of American Civil War Medal of Honor recipients: Q–S
