= Martin J. Kennedy =

American politician

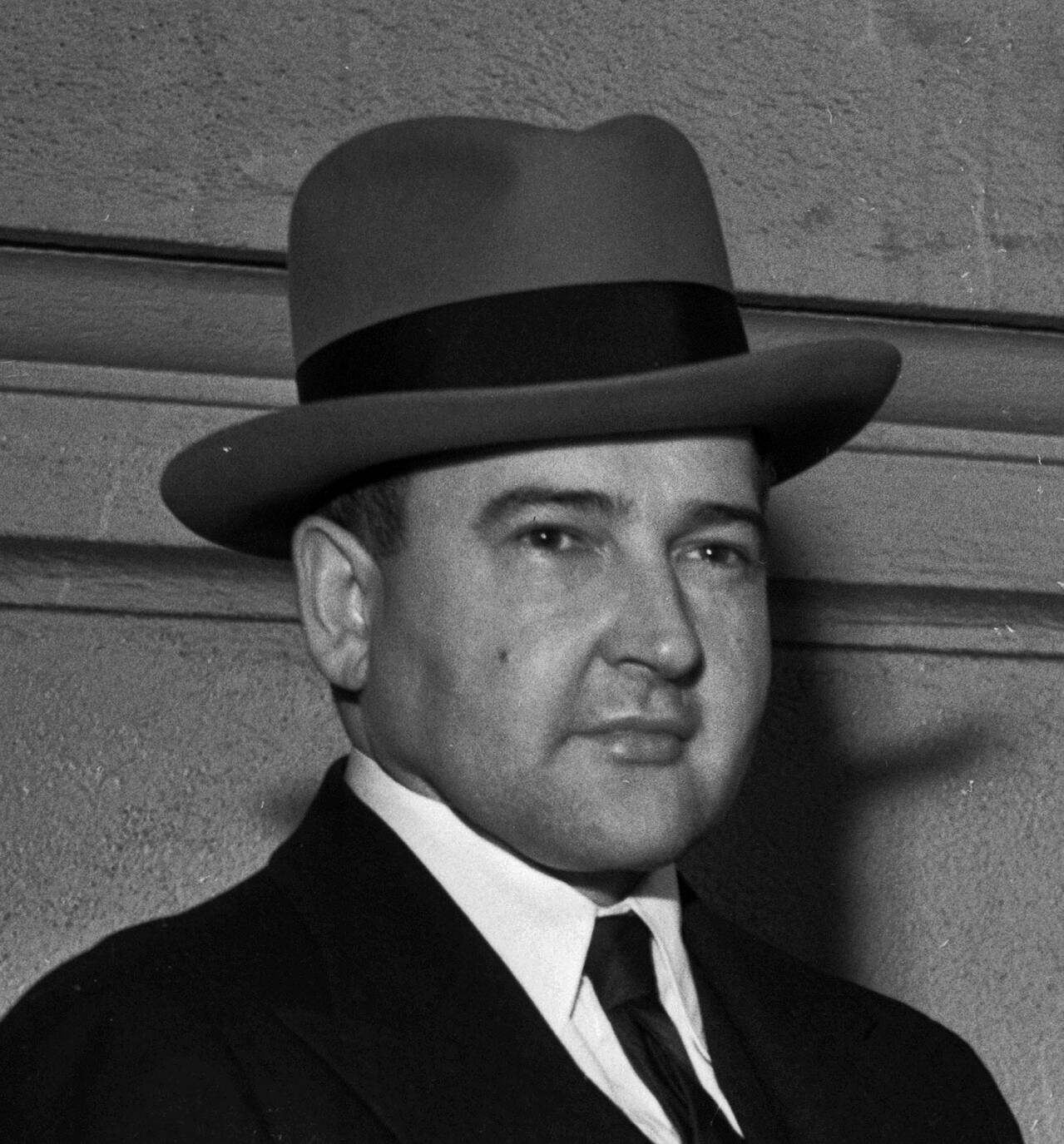
- Kennedy in 1935

Member of the U.S. House of Representatives from New York's 18th district
- In office April 11, 1930 – January 3, 1945
- Preceded by: John F. Carew
- Succeeded by: Vito Marcantonio

Member of the New York State Senate from the 18th District
- In office 1924–1930
- Preceded by: Salvatore A. Cotillo
- Succeeded by: John T. McCall

Personal details
- Born: August 29, 1892 New York City, New York, U.S.
- Died: October 27, 1955 (aged 63) New York City, New York, U.S.
- Resting place: Calvary Cemetery, Queens, New York
- Party: Democratic
- Education: Columbia University; College of the City of New York
- Occupation: Real estate broker Insurance broker

Martin John Kennedy (August 29, 1892 – October 27, 1955) was an Irish-American politician from New York. A real estate and insurance broker in New York City, Kennedy is most notable for his service as a Democratic member of the New York State Senate (1924-1930) and the United States House of Representatives (1930-1945).

== Biography ==
Kennedy was born in New York City on August 29, 1892. He attended the public schools, and graduated from Columbia University in 1909; and from the College of the City of New York in 1914. Then he engaged in the real estate and insurance business, and entered politics.

=== World War II ===
He served in the United States Army Intelligence during World War I; and was Chairman of the New York City School Board from 1918 to 1924.

=== State legislature ===
He was a member of the New York State Senate (18th D.) from 1924 to 1930, sitting in the 147th through 153rd New York State Legislatures.

=== Congress ===
Kennedy was elected as a Democrat to the 71st United States Congress to fill the vacancy caused by the resignation of John F. Carew, and was re-elected to the seven succeeding Congresses, holding office from April 11, 1930, to January 3, 1945.

=== Later career and death ===
Afterwards he resumed the real estate and insurance business.

He died on October 27, 1955, in New York City. He was buried at the Calvary Cemetery in Queens.

New York State Senate
Preceded by Salvatore A. Cotillo	New York State Senate; 18th District; 1924–1930	Succeeded by John T. McCall
U.S. House of Representatives
Preceded by John F. Carew	Member of the U.S. House of Representatives from New York's 18th congressional district 1930–1945	Succeeded by Vito Marcantonio
