= Franz Kramer =

United States Navy Medal of Honor recipient

- Born: January 20, 1865; Nierstein, Germany
- Died: April 18, 1924 (aged 59); New York City, US
- Burial place: Calvary Cemetery, Woodside, New York
- Military career
- Allegiance: United States of America
- Branch: United States Navy
- Rank: Seaman
- Unit: U.S.S. Marblehead
- Conflicts: Spanish–American War
- Awards: Medal of Honor

Franz Kramer (January 20, 1865 – April 18, 1924) was a seaman serving in the United States Navy during the Spanish–American War who received the Medal of Honor for bravery.

== Biography ==
Kramer was born January 20, 1865, in Germany and after entering the navy was sent to fight in the Spanish–American War aboard the U.S.S. Marblehead as a seaman.

On May 11, 1898, the Marblehead was given the task of cutting the cable leading from Cienfuegos, Cuba. During the operation and facing heavy enemy fire, Kramer continued to perform his duties throughout this action.

He died on April 18, 1924, in New York City and is buried in Calvary Cemetery, Woodside, New York.

== Medal of Honor citation ==
Rank and organization: Seaman, U.S. Navy. Born. January 20, 1865, Germany. G.O. No.: 521, July 7, 1899.

Citation:

On board the U.S.S. Marblehead during the operation of cutting the cable leading from Cienfuegos, Cuba, May 11, 1898. Facing the heavy fire of the enemy, Kramer set an example of extraordinary bravery and coolness throughout this action.

== See also ==
- List of Medal of Honor recipients for the Spanish–American War
