= Peter Macfarlane =

Canadian TV Producer/Director (1927–1965)

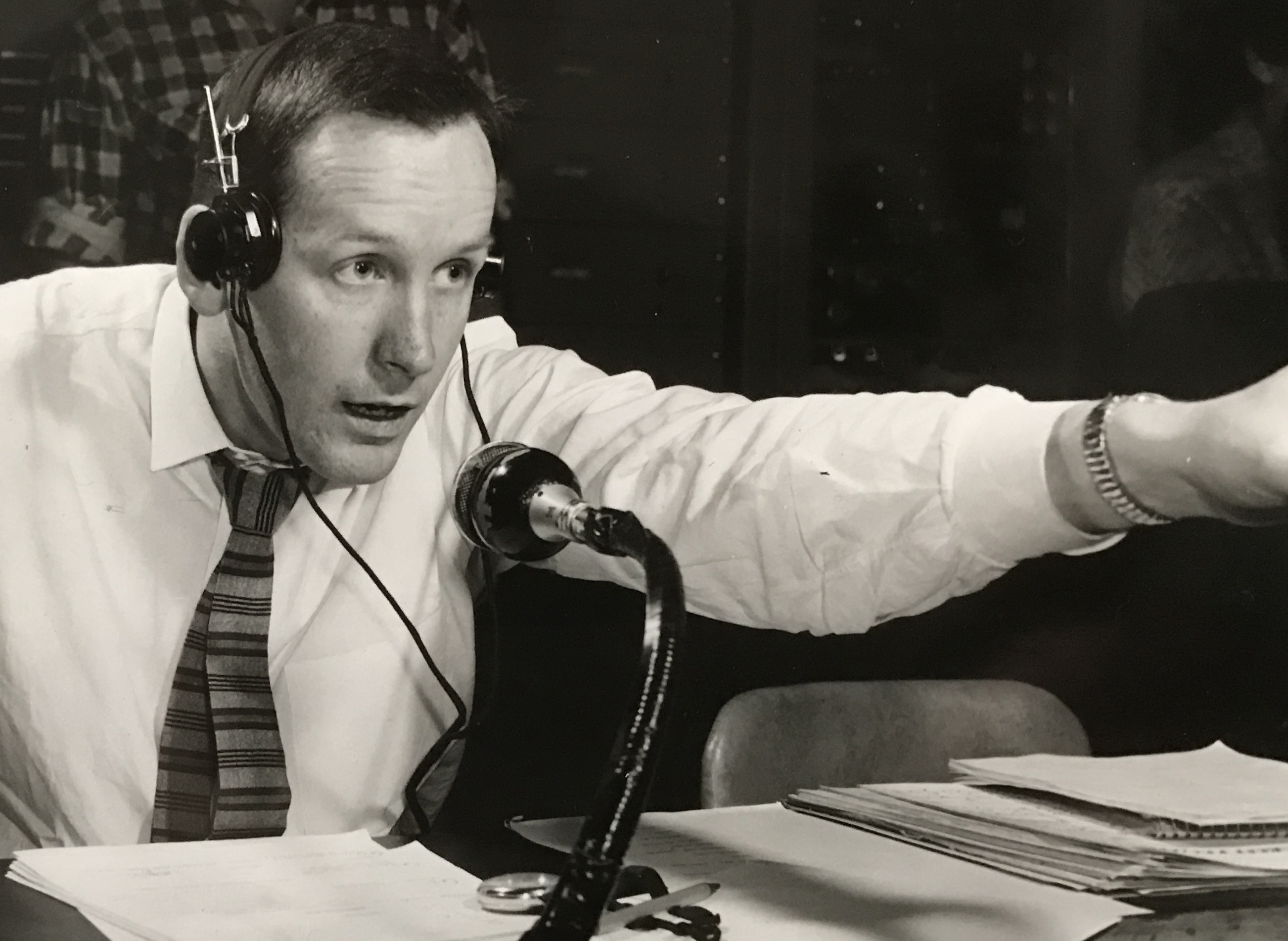
- Born: 1927; Vancouver, Canada
- Died: 1965 (aged 37–38); Tobermory, Ontario, Canada
- Occupation(s): Director, producer, writer
- Years active: 1949–1965
- Known for: Revue '61 Revue '62

Peter Macfarlane (1927 – 1965) was a Canadian TV director and producer. Hs career took him from Canada to Granada TV in the UK and ATV in Australia in the early days of television.

== Early life ==
Macfarlane began in radio, as an announcer for CBR, in Calgary, Canada. He moved to CKDA in 1946 in Victoria, British Columbia. He was drawn to the new technology of television and graduated top of his class from the New York School of Radio and Television in 1950.

== Film and television career ==
Returning from New York, Macfarlane moved to Toronto, initially to work in the fledgling TV division of MacLaren Advertising. Working with Frank Peppiatt, also at MacLaren, he handled a very early television closed circuit demonstration where a live double header baseball game between the Toronto Maple Leafs and the Ottawa Giants was captured live at the stadium and transmitted via microwave to viewers at the CGE booth at the Canadian National Exhibition (September, 1951).

Subsequently, he moved to CBC TV in Toronto in 1951 and created or worked on many early television shows, including Juliette, Haunted Studio, Graphic, Cross Country Hit Parade, and others. When the CBC Radio program "Mr Showbusiness" starring celebrated violinist Jack Arthur moved to television in October, 1954, Macfarlane produced the show for CBC and the sponsor, Borden's.

In June, 1957, Macfarlane announced plans to move to the UK to join Granada TV.

The Canadian government encouraged a new, independent national network, CTV, to launch non-CBC stations in all major markets. Macfarlane moved to CTV and used the new Toronto station, CFTO, as his home base.

== Personal life and death ==
Peter Macfarlane was a keen scuba diver and wrote extensively for the Canadian Sub Aqua Club and other similar organizations.

While on a dive out of Tobermory, Ontario, Macfarlane and three other divers were drowned in a boating accident when a violent storm arose. The boat capsized and all were lost. An inquest determined that the boat was heavily loaded despite the experience of the four divers.
