= William Connors =

William Connors may refer to:

- William J. Connors (1891–1961), Illinois politician
- Billy Connors (1941–2018), baseball player
- Bill Connors (born 1949), musician
- William Connors (baseball), manager of Bloomington Bloomers
- William W. Connors, game designer

== Entertainment ==
- William Connors, also known as Billy Conners, a fictional Marvel Comics character who is the son of Curtis Connors

== See also ==
- William Connor (disambiguation)
