= Salvatore A. Cotillo =

Justice of the New York State Supreme Court

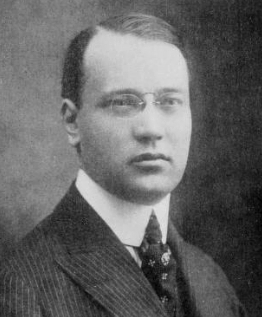
- Cotillo in 1922
- Born: November 19, 1886; Naples, Kingdom of Italy
- Died: July 27, 1939 (aged 52); New York City, U.S.
- Occupations: Justice of the New York State Supreme Court, First District
- Known for: The first Italian-American to serve in both houses of the New York State Legislature and the first to who served as Justice of the New York State Supreme Court

Salvatore Albert Cotillo (November 19, 1886 – July 27, 1939) was an Italian-born New York lawyer, Democratic Party politician and judge. Elected in 1912, he was the first Italian-American to serve in both houses of the New York State Legislature and the first who served as Justice of the New York State Supreme Court. Nominated to the court in the First District, he sat on the bench from 1924 until his death in 1939.

Cotillo was a strong proponent of social and pro-labor legislation. He defended ethnic Italians against the stereotyping by Americans not of Italian descent, but also urged the need for Americanization of the Italian community. As such, he stood between the mores of the Italian ethnic ghetto in East Harlem where he grew up, and the judgment and norms of American society where he made his career.

== From Naples to New York ==
Born in Naples, Italy, he came to the United States in 1895 with his parents at the age of nine. His father Francesco Cotillo, had been a caterer in Naples. The family originally came from Avellino (Montella), in the hinterland of Naples. The family settled in East Harlem in East 113th Street among the increasing numbers of Italian immigrants. His father took up catering again and opened a popular pastry and confectionery shop. He has been credited with introducing the Italian ice cream spumoni into the United States.

The oldest of four children, the young Salvatore did not speak English and went to Public School 83 and later to DeWitt Clinton High School and Manhattan College. During those formative years he worked in the family's pastry shop, where intellectuals of the neighborhood gathered in the evening to discuss social and political issues with his father. Those debates gave birth to Cotillo's early social consciousness that formed the basis of his adult devotion to social reform legislation. The young Cotillo was passionate about baseball and became a New York Giants fan. In return for free tickets he used to clean the stadium seats.

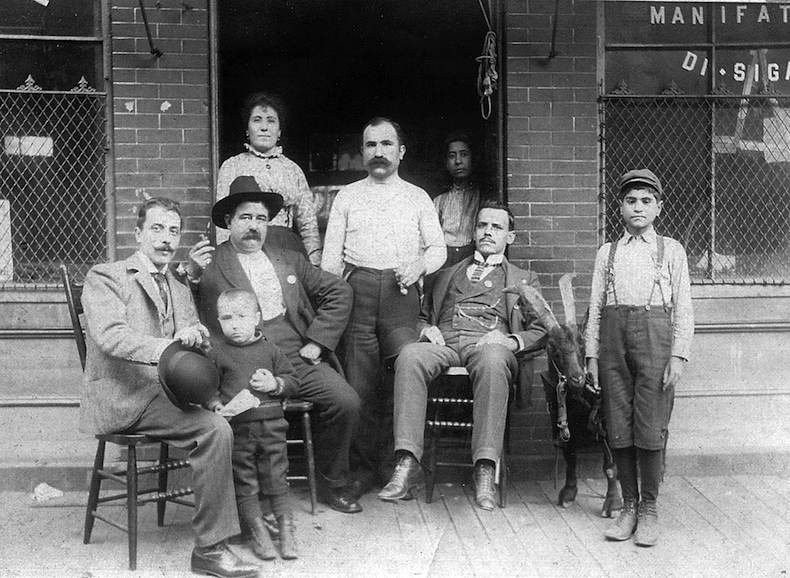
Crime boss Giosuè Gallucci and wife Assunta outside Gallucci's East 109th Street cigar business, c. 1900

In 1911 he completed a law degree from Fordham University and was admitted to the New York State bar in 1912. At the time Cotillo was the only Italian-American lawyer in the neighbourhood and was practicing in the street in front of his father's gelato and pastry shop on East 116th Street. Most of his clients could not read or write in either Italian or English. "Neighbors and friends sought his aid in the preparation of applications for various licenses, or petitions on behalf of their relatives who wished to emigrate to the United States. Cotillo served an apprenticeship in human problems," according to his biographer.

As a young attorney Cotillo had to distance himself from the local underworld that incorporated many members of the Camorra from Naples who tried to impose their "services". When the so-called King of Little Italy, the Camorra boss Giosue Gallucci, was arrested for carrying concealed weapons, Cotillo was asked to testify as a character witness on his behalf, but refused. Cotillo felt that Gallucci looked at others as if they "were either hirelings or payers of tribute." According to Cotillo "it was a matter of concern in the neighborhood if you were looked down upon by Gallucci." Despite the temptation of attractive fees, he refused to help men of Gallucci's disposition to secure gun permits.

== Early political career ==
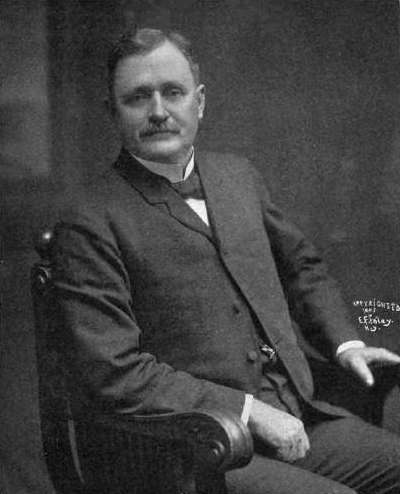
Nicholas J. Hayes in 1908 as Commissioner of the New York Fire Department

Cotillo's early law practice included a lot of uncompensated charity for the neighborhood. Cotillo was more than just a lawyer; he advised and represented his clients as they had to deal with society outside the Italian neighbourhood. "Many problems were personal; but some had a community aspect and Cotillo was exhilarated by the challenge they offered to find a solution .... An earnest group of the more frequent callers regarded him as their leader in planning for the realization of a better life for their immigrant neighbors," according to his biographer. Cotillo's activities in the courts made him aware of the misfortunes in his community. Italian-Americans were told they must pay illicit tribute to get permits, even if only for push-carts, bootblacks and newsstands. Others seeking employment in the municipal street-cleaning department were asked to pay weeks and months of their earnings when appointed. This racket system, whose exploiters mostly came from among their own, took advantage of the fears and ignorance of the poor.

Apart from a genuine social compassion, Cotillo was also building political alliances that would make it possible for him to use the Italian-American voter power as his Irish-American forerunners in New York were using the power of other immigrant groups. With his father, Cotillo was among the co-founders of a political club called the Tomahawk Democratic Club that took on the Tammany Hall political machine supporting Nicholas J. Hayes, putting forward Henry H. Lazarus as his opponent. The fight was ruthless, with both sides harassing the other's speakers. Lazarus got beaten in the electoral contest, but Cotillo, supported by the Italian-American vote, made a deal with Hayes that gave Little Italy a political foothold in the city. "I want to help my people," he said explaining his switch, "and can do so only with the backing of those in power."

In 1913, at the age of 27, he became the first Italian-born assemblyman. When Cotillo arrived in the New York State Assembly in Albany that year, the powerful ethnic Irish State Senator "Big Tim" Sullivan observed: "Mark my words, it is the beginning of the Italian era in politics. Watch them."

Cottilo would be elected to office from Italian East Harlem between 1912 and 1922. Raised in the ghetto, he was chosen by the largely Italian neighborhood and continued to depend upon their political support throughout his political career. He was a member of the New York State Assembly (New York Co., 28th District) in 1913, 1915 and 1916. He drew support from the Citizens Union and was identified for two notable pieces of legislation; pensions for widows and the Workmen's Compensations Law. He advocated for women's suffrage, gun control, the end of the death penalty and school lunch programs.

== New York senator ==
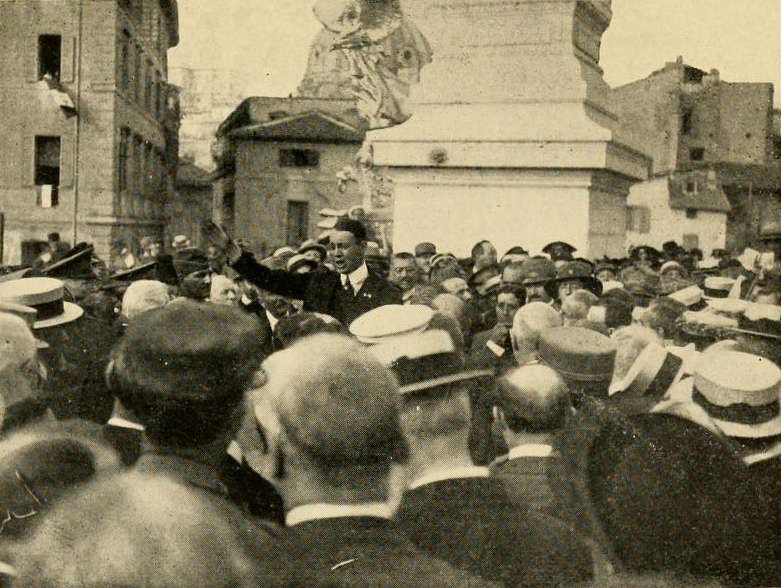
Cotillo addressing a crowd in front the Victor Emmanuel Monument in Rome, July 4, 1918

He was a member of the New York State Senate from 1917 to 1923. He served the 20th District in the 140th and 141st New York State Legislature and represented the 18th District in the 142nd, 143rd, 144th, 145th and 146th New York State Legislatures. In March 1918, Cotillo opposed the proposed prohibition of alcohol in the state. Although he believed in temperance, he doubted if that would be achieved by prohibition; he advocated education and not infringing on civil liberties.

In May 1918, he was sent to Italy by President Woodrow Wilson to make a study of the economic conditions of that country during World War I in order to provide information for economic relief programs and encourage the Italians to continue the war effort after the disastrous defeat at Caporetto. As a representative of the Committee on Public Information, he spent most of the year in Italy and won the praise of President Wilson. He also received the decoration of Grand Officer of the Italian Crown from King Victor Emmanuel III of Italy.

From mid-June to the end of September 1918 Cotillo traveled around Italy, meeting officials and politicians, giving interviews to the press and addressing large crowds. His efforts in Italy were reported by the press and Italian language newspapers at home in the U.S.. When he returned to New York, Cotillo had risen from a largely unknown local politician to achieve public stature and become a leader of the Italian community. Based on this experience he wrote the book "Italy During the World War", published in 1922.

== Social reforms ==
Back from Italy and in the New York State Senate, he fought hard for the regulation of informal immigrant banks and banking agents that handled money transfers abroad, an issue of significant importance to his Italian constituency who were often swindled from their remittances to their families in Italy. Cotillo demanded legislation to supervise immigrant banks and to safeguard customers' deposits. His 1921 banking reform bill, which placed express companies and steamship agencies that transferred money abroad under the supervision of the New York State Banking Department, annoyed powerful interests of such companies as Wells Fargo and the Cunard Lines.

He received death threats and offers of bribes to drop the legislation he had introduced in the Senate. Cotillo's legislation appeared to be disregarded until Republican Governor Nathan L. Miller proposed several compromises. As a result, four bills that regulated the sector were signed into law on May 1, 1921. With the return of progressive Democrat Al Smith to the Governor's office in 1923, Cotillo introduced new bills to reduce the weaknesses of the 1921 concessions. During the hearings on Cotillo's bill in March 1923, a devastating crash of the Tisbo Brothers immigrant bank at 121 Mott Street in lower Manhattan left 2,000 angry depositors, demanding their money they had deposited, with losses of more than two million dollars.

Cotillo was member of the Joint Legislative Committee on Housing, also known as the Lockwood Committee because it was headed by Charles C. Lockwood. The committee investigated renting and building conditions in the City of New York and ended a spate of rent-raising as a result of the housing shortage after World War I. The group found that the housing conditions at the time constituted a serious menace to public health in New York since some 400,000 persons were directly affected by the scarcity of affordable dwellings and the poor quality of the existing ones. Later he was the chairman of New York state commission to investigate child welfare, and a member of the Joint Legislative Committee to Investigate Exploitation of Immigrants (1923–24).

Cotillo supported Leonard Covello, one of the great educators of New York City and among first teachers of Italian background in the city high schools, in his fight to admit Italian to the high school curriculum to enhance the self-image of Italian boys, which was granted by the Board of Education in 1922. As the foremost force on the New York State Commission to Examine Laws Relating to Child Welfare, concerned with issues of custody, orphanage, child support, and state wardship and institutions, Cotillo pushed a comprehensive reform through the legislature with the support of the social-welfare advocate Sophie Irene Loeb and the Hearst newspapers. His biographer, Nat Ferber, a former Hearst reporter, considered the reform to be "the outstanding achievement of Cotillo's career".

In 1923, on behalf of the National Woman's Party, he introduced into the New York State Senate twenty-five radical equal rights bills for women to remove from the statutes of New York any inequalities now existing in the legal rights and obligations of men and women. One of the radical bills provided that a wife may demand wages from her husband for the services she performs in the home. "The law as to the ownership by the husband of the services or labor of his wife is totally abrogated," the bill said.

== Relationship with Italian Fascism ==
Justice Cotillo in 1938, announcing that he had asked Premier Mussolini to suspend the banning of intermarriage of Jews and Italians, until Cotillo could go to Italy and plead the cause of the Jews. (Associated Press Wirephoto)

Cotillo was a Grand Master of the Order Sons of Italy in America (OSIA) and after World War I actively propagated the nationalist cause of Italian control over Fiume, despite President Wilson's denial of the Italian claims to the Adriatic port. In the 1920s Cotillo tried to ease the rising tension between Italian-American Fascists and anti-Fascists by taking a stance between the two. In 1923, he went to Rome to meet Benito Mussolini. He was impressed and described Mussolini as a "commanding element of the highest order". He vowed to correct the image of Mussolini and Fascism, but also cautioned his Italian-American countrymen saying that the American way was to be preferred above Fascism.

Pro-Fascists opposed the assimilation policies of Cotillo, who had become Grand Venerable of the New York State branch of OSIA in 1921 and had started an ambitious English language program as a means for upward mobility of the Italian-American community. According to Cotillo, Fascism as a movement was "out of place in the United States" although it could serve its purpose in Italy. He said that American citizens of Italian origin that were truly engaged in Americanization should reject Fascism as incompatible and un-American. Eventually, he joined Fiorello La Guardia and Luigi Antonini, of the International Ladies Garment Workers Union, in founding an anti-Fascist New York State chapter of OSIA, the Sons of Italy Grand Lodge. Nevertheless, Cotillo was a staunch supporter of the Italian invasion of Ethiopia in 1935. Carried away by nationalistic pride and drawn increasingly closer to the Fascist regime, he added his influential voice to the chorus of Italian Americans urging Democratic President Franklin Delano Roosevelt and Congress to refrain from enacting economic sanctions against Italy.

In October 1938, Cotillo lobbied Mussolini "for more lenient consideration of the Jewish problem in Italy." In a letter to Il Duce he tried persuade the Italian dictator that Fascist Italy's recent anti-Semitic legislation was unwise, and asked to "postpone execution of such drastic action for a reasonable time until an opportunity has been afforded me to appear before you and present the worthy cause because your edict may result in serious consequences in America." He asked for the repeal of the anti-Jewish laws and warned for a boycott of Italian goods in New York, where, as he wrote, "we live in close interdependent relationship" with Jewish people. The meeting never took place.

== New York Supreme Court justice ==
After the 1922 elections, Cotillo became the chairman of the influential State Senate Judiciary Committee, a sign of his rising authority. The post helped him to get ready for a next step. In 1924, he was the first Italian-born to become Justice of the New York Supreme Court, First District, where he would remain until his death. He was elected with the endorsement of the Tammany Hall political machine, many social welfare organizations and organized labor, the Citizen's Union and several bar organizations.

While an immigrant himself and although he had been an ardent defender of the liberal interpretation of the naturalization law for a long time, in 1939 and in the wake of World War II, Cotillo advocated more stringent naturalization methods. Immigrants would be forced to pay the costs of an exhaustive investigation of their qualifications. He argued that there was a "need for more hesitation in the granting of this charter of liberty to each and every applicant without a more thorough search of each and every applicant's capacity to benefit from such a gift." He also recommended revocation of citizenship when found guilty of fraud or other wrongdoing.

Earlier, Cotillo had opposed the anti-immigration restrictions of the Immigration Act of 1924 that significantly limited immigration from Italy. In 1931, Cotillo protested against unnecessary stringent requirements of a proposed registration law, particularly the requirement of the equivalent of a public school education and the fingerprinting of applicants. A naturalized citizen had the same rights as native-born and fingerprinting would make the foreign applicant feel like a criminal, Cotillo pointed out. He referred to the findings of the Wickersham Commission that the foreign-born committed considerably less crime than native citizens. He also attacked the revocation of citizenship because of evil doing, while a native born was not affected. At the time, Cotillo claimed to have naturalized some 25,000 immigrants in the eight years he had been on the bench.

== Death and legacy ==
On July 27, 1939, he died following an operation for a chest tumor at Columbia-Presbyterian Medical Center, Manhattan, New York, at the age of 52. He was survived by his widow, Ida Berthold, and two daughters, Helen Paterno – who had married the son of prominent real estate developer Charles V. Paterno – and Sally Cotillo. More than 3,000 people attended his funeral in Saint Patrick's Cathedral, including New York mayor Fiorello La Guardia, Lieutenant Governor Charles Poletti, District Attorney Thomas E. Dewey and former New York Governor Alfred E. Smith. He was the subject of a biography by Nat Ferber, A New American, published in 1938.

Throughout his life, both as a legislator and judge, he earned a reputation for compassion with the underprivileged and social activism which put that compassion to work. According to New York Governor Alfred E. Smith in his introduction in Cotillo's biography, Cotillo "introduced a new era in social relations between the immigrant and native or older Americans". He was commemorated by Eugene Keogh in the United States House of Representatives.

For Italian-Americans, Cotillo did not emphasize being American, but emphasized voting: "Become citizens," Cotillo said, "You will then have the right to take part in the government. This is a system of self-government. You Italians, more than others, should understand this. For so long as you leave it to others you will be oppressed by these others," he said, "the longer you remain inarticulate and inactive, by so much longer will you be looked upon as not merely alien in blood and temperament, but in thought and moral philosophy. You will be looked upon as outlaws. Do not delay, for the longer you are held in low esteem, so much the longer will it require to establish yourself as worthy citizens in the eyes of those who today look down on you."

In the obituary of The New York Times, Cotillo was described as "a leader of the Italian Americans in New York". He defended ethnic Italians against the stereotyping by Americans not of Italian descent, but also urged the need for "Americanization" of the Italian community. As such, he stood between the mores of the Italian ethnic ghetto and the judgment and norms of American society.

== Sources ==
- Cottilo, Salvatore A. (1922). Italy During the World War, Boston: The Christopher publishing house
- Ferber, Nat Joseph (1938). A New American. From the Life Story of Salvatore A. Cotillo, Supreme Court Justice, State of New York, New York: Farrar & Rinehart
- Gill, Jonathan (2011). Harlem: The Four Hundred Year History from Dutch Village to Capital of Black America, New York: Grove Press, ISBN 978-0-8021-1910-0
- Glazer, Nathan & Moynihan, Daniel P. (1963). Beyond the melting pot; the Negroes, Puerto Ricans, Jews, Italians, and Irish of New York City, Cambridge, Mass., M.I.T. Press
- Grover, Warren (2003). Nazis in Newark, New Brunswick (NJ): Transaction Publishers, ISBN 978-0-7658-0516-4
- Henderson, Thomas M. (1979). Immigrant Politician: Salvatore Cotillo, Progressive Ethnic, International Migration Review, Vol. 13, No. 1, (Spring, 1979), pp. 81–102
- Luconi, Stefano (2019). "La frattura sull'antisemitismo: la contrapposizione tra intellettuali antifascisti e lavoratori italoamericani di fronte ai provvedimenti razziali del 1938". In Guarnieri, Patrizia (ed.). L'emigrazione intellettuale dall'Italia fascista: Studenti e studiosi ebrei dell'Università di Firenze in fuga all'estero (PDF) (in Italian) (1st ed.). Florence: Firenze University Press. pp. 73–87. ISBN 978-88-6453-874-7.
- Nazzaro, Pellegrino (2008). Fascist and Anti-Fascist Propaganda in America: The Dispatches of Italian Ambassador Gelasio Caetani, Youngstown (NY): Cambria Press
- Newark, Timothy (2012). The Mafia at War: Allied Collusion with the Mob, Havertown (PA): Casemate Publishers
- Shaffer, Thomas L. and Shaffer, Mary M., (1988). Lawyers as Assimilators and Preservers, Scholarly Works Notre Dame Law School, Paper 146

New York State Assembly
Preceded by Jacob Levy	New York State Assembly; New York County, 28th District; 1913	Succeeded by George E. Findlater
Preceded by George E. Findlater	New York State Assembly; New York County, 28th District; 1915–1916	Succeeded by Charles Novello
New York State Senate
Preceded by Irving J. Joseph	New York State Senate; 20th District; 1917–1918	Succeeded by William C. Dodge
Preceded by Albert Ottinger	New York State Senate; 18th District; 1919–1923	Succeeded by Martin J. Kennedy
