= Juliette (TV program) =

Canadian music variety television program

- Genre: Music
- Written by: Saul Ilson (1956-1959); Alex Barris (1959-1963); Rich Eustis (1963-1965); Allan Blye (1965-1966); Peter Mann (1965-1966)
- Starring: Juliette
- Narrated by: Gil Christie
- Opening theme: "Love and Marriage"
- Country of origin: Canada
- Original language: English
- No. of seasons: 10

Production
- Executive producer: Stan Jacobson (1965-1966)
- Producers: Syd Wayne (1956-1958); Peter Macfarlane (1958-1959); Bob Jarvis (1959-1964); Stan Jacobson (1964-1965); Mark Warren (1965-1966)
- Production location: Toronto

Original release
- Network: CBC Television
- Release: 27 October 1956 – 18 June 1966

Juliette is a Canadian music variety television program that aired on CBC Television from 1956 to 1966.

== Premise ==
Juliette Cavazzi made early Canadian radio and television appearances on programs such as Holiday Ranch. She was a regular on The Billy O'Connor Show from 1955 and inherited that show's time slot in 1956 following a dispute with O'Connor.

The program opened with the tagline, "[n]ow let's meet, and greet, your pet. . .Ju-u-liette", as delivered by announcer Gil Christie. Juliette then greeted the audience saying, "Hi there, everybody." Each episode proceeded with selections of current and past popular music then Juliette finished the programme with her phrase, "Good night, Mom.".

Bobby Gimby was a regular performer during the program's initial years, joined by an "escort" or male vocalist. Other regular performers included the vocal groups The Four Romeos (1959–1965) and The Four Mice (1960–64).

Player's cigarettes was a key show sponsor; series announcer Gil Christie also narrated the company's advertisements.

== Production ==
The program was produced at CBC Toronto and was broadcast live. Its rehearsals were frequently conducted immediately prior to air time during Hockey Night in Canada. In 1957, each episode's production cost was $6000. Visiting artists included Eleanor Collins, Jack Jones, Marg Osborne and Earl Wrightson. Gino Silvi provided choral arrangements for the series.

Significant changes were made for the final 1965–66 season. Bill Isbister, musical director since the program's debut, was replaced by Lucio Agostini. More attention was given to visiting artists and a new "This Week" segment was introduced to promote particular performers and their upcoming events. The Art Hallman Singers became regular performers.

== Scheduling ==
This program was broadcast from 27 October 1956 to 18 June 1966, generally after the Saturday hockey broadcast and national newscast. Its first season's air time was 11:10 p.m.

The cancellation of Juliette was made public by CBC on 7 April 1966, announcing that its star would move "into the field of one-hour specials". The time slot that September was replaced by the short-lived multicultural music series A World of Music. Meanwhile, Juliette was scheduled for at least two appearances in the 1966–67 season on the network's Show of the Week Monday broadcasts.

== Reception ==
The program attracted substantial viewership, exceeding one million viewers per episode, retaining a large proportion of the ratings of the preceding hockey games. Juliette's performance style on the series was inoffensive, positive and informal.

Globe and Mail columnist Dennis Braithwaite took a critical view of the programme's quality. When Juliette was cancelled in 1966, he noted the star's "real trouble has been her failure to grow as a performer" during the ten seasons. Braithwaite further felt the automatically high audience levels following the hockey broadcasts curtailed any incentive for creative production and improved program financing.

== See also ==
- Juliette and Friends (1973–1975)

== Bibliography ==
- Rutherford, Paul (1990), When Television Was Young: Primetime Canada 1952-1967, University of Toronto Press, ISBN 0-8020-5830-2
