= Patrick Ginley =

- Born: December 11, 1822; Ireland
- Died: April 5, 1917 (aged 94)
- Burial place: Calvary Cemetery, Queens, New York
- Military career
- Allegiance: United States of America
- Branch: United States Army
- Rank: Private
- Units: (New York (state)) Battery G, 1st Battalion, New York Volunteer Light Artillery
- Conflicts: American Civil War; Second Battle of Ream's Station
- Awards: Medal of Honor

Patrick Ginley (December 11, 1822 – April 5, 1917) was a Union Army soldier in the American Civil War who received the U.S. military's highest decoration, the Medal of Honor.

Ginley was born in Ireland, and entered service at Woodside, Queens, in New York City. He was awarded the Medal of Honor, for extraordinary heroism shown in Dinwiddie County, Virginia, for bravery in action during the Second Battle of Ream's Station, while serving as a Private with Company F, 2nd U.S. Artillery. His Medal of Honor was issued on October 31, 1890.

Ginley died at the age of 94, on April 5, 1917, and was buried in the Calvary Cemetery in Queens, New York.

== Medal of Honor citation ==
The President of the United States of America, in the name of Congress, takes pleasure in presenting the Medal of Honor to Private Patrick Ginley, United States Army, for extraordinary heroism on 25 August 1864, while serving with Company G, 1st New York Light Artillery, in action at Reams' Station, Virginia. The command having been driven from the works, Private Ginley, having been left alone between the opposing lines, crept back into the works, put three charges of canister in one of the guns, and fired the piece directly into a body of the enemy about to seize the works; he then rejoined his command, took the colors, and ran toward the enemy, followed by the command, which recaptured the works and guns.
