= Graphic (TV program) =

- Genre: Current affairs
- Written by: Norman Klenman (1956); Ron Krantz (1956-57)
- Presented by: Joe McCulley; Rex Loring
- Country of origin: Canada
- Original language: English
- No. of seasons: 2

Production
- Executive producer: Sydney Newman
- Producer: Peter Macfarlane
- Running time: 30 minutes

Original release
- Network: CBC Television
- Release: 2 March 1956 – 21 June 1957

Graphic is a Canadian current affairs television program that aired on CBC Television between 1956 and 1957.

== Premise ==
Joe McCulley hosted this news program with announcer Rex Loring.

Initially, Graphic was promoted as a collection of "entertaining items of a real-life variety, on the premise that people are always interested in what the other fellow is doing." As the program developed, it featured interviews with notable Canadian personalities.

The first season was sponsored by the Ford Motor Company of Canada, which wanted the program to be titled Ford Graphic. However, the CBC rejected calls to include a sponsor name to its journalistic programmes. Ford remained a sponsor for the initial thirteen episodes.

== Production ==
Each episode of Graphic cost approximately $20,000 and regularly featured camerawork outside CBC studios and often presented remote stories live. Peter Macfarlane produced the program with Bill Bolt as supervising producer, Donal Wilson as coordinating producer and Norman DePoe as editorial supervisor.

== Scheduling ==
The half-hour program was broadcast Fridays at 9:00 p.m. for two seasons starting 2 March 1956 and ending 21 June 1957, with a break between June and October 1956.
