= Hermann Ziegner =

United States Army Medal of Honor recipient

- Born: 1864; Weimar, Saxe-Weimar-Eisenach
- Died: September 9, 1898 (aged 34); Brooklyn, New York, United States
- Burial place: Calvary Cemetery
- Military career
- Allegiance: United States of America
- Branch: United States Cavalry
- Service years: c. 1882–1898
- Rank: First Sergeant
- Units: 7th U.S. Cavalry; 71st New York Volunteer Infantry Regiment
- Conflicts: Indian Wars; Spanish–American War
- Awards: Medal of Honor
- Other work: Equitable Building night watchman

Herman or Hermann Ziegner (1864 – September 9, 1898) was a German-American soldier who served in the U.S. Army during the Indian Wars and the Spanish–American War. In 1891, he was one of twenty men to receive the Medal of Honor at the Battle of Wounded Knee., now called the Wounded Knee Massacre. He was also a non-commissioned officer of 71st New York Volunteer Infantry Regiment, taking part in the Santiago campaign and the charge up San Juan Hill, and was one of many regimental members who died from malnourishment and malaria prior to and shortly after returning to the United States.

== Biography ==
Hermann Ziegner was born to Hugo and Lena Ziegner in Saxe-Weimar-Eisenach. He emigrated to the United States when he was 14 years old.

He first enlisted in the Army in 1889; at the conclusion of his five-year enlistment, he re-enlisted for another term but was discharged as a sergeant before the end of his term of service. His Regular Army service was with the 7th Cavalry Regiment and occurred during the Indian Wars and the Spanish–American War Ziegner served with the 7th U.S. Cavalry for several years as a private in Troop E. At the Wounded Knee Massacre, he was cited for "conspicuous bravery" against attacking Sioux, concealed in a ravine, at Wounded Knee Creek on December 29 and again while defending a hill near the Catholic mission at White Clay Creek on December 30, 1890. Ziegner was promoted to the rank of corporal and was one of twenty men to receive the Medal of Honor. He officially received the award from Congress on June 23, 1891.

After eight years on the American frontier, Ziegner was honorably discharged and settled in New York City. He worked as a night watchman at the safe deposit vaults in the Equitable Building. He married in 1894 and lived with his wife on 124th Street, between Seventh and Lenox avenues, in Manhattan.

Ziegner was a sergeant and later the first sergeant of Company E, 71st New York Infantry. At the start of the Spanish–American War, Ziegner was one of the first men to join the 71st New York Volunteer Infantry Regiment. He served as a first sergeant of Company E during the Santiago campaign and "suffered all the privation and hardship endured by the members of the Seventy-first" during that time. Ziegner was one of the officers to lead Company E up San Juan Hill, alongside personal friend Captain Malcolm J. Rafferty of Company F, and according to his commanding officer Lieutenant William R. Hill "there was no braver man in the company".

Two weeks after the regiment landed at Montauk, he came to Long Island City on a furlough, suffering from pernicious malaria. His salary had been discontinued after leaving the regiment, and his wife was forced to give up their home. They had been staying at the home of a family friend, Mrs. E. Bracken, at 86 Seventh Street before he was taken to St. John's Hospital in Brooklyn. He was able to sit up unassisted during his first two days, and hoped to return to work, but his condition grew steadily worse over the next two weeks. Doctor Frank E. Brennan treated Ziegner during his time in Long Island City free of charge and providing for the medicine. He also assisted his wife in getting Ziegner admitted to a private hospital but found difficulty in arraigning a carriage. The hospital then had no ambulance, and the Red Cross were unavailable to assist. Local liverymen sometimes hired out their carriages, but none were willing to carry a malaria patient. By the time one was brought around to the house, Ziegner was too weak to ride. After nearly a week and a half, he was finally brought to St. John's Hospital in Brooklyn on the night of September 8, 1898. His wife accompanied her husband to the hospital and was allowed to remain at his bedside until he died the next evening. His funeral was held at Mrs. Bracken's home on Sunday afternoon, and he was then buried in Calvary Cemetery. Though they had no children, his wife was expecting their first child at the time of his death.

Ziegner had been generally described as "a fine specimen of manhood, over six feet in height and possessing a splendid physique", but his appearance as well as his health had declined after his return. In his final weeks, he expressed to his wife his belief of the government's poor treatment of the 71st and other returning veterans. He was also of the belief that his illness, as those of the regiment, were exacerbated by government-issued hardtack and bacon army rations and, had they been provided with better food, they would not have been in such a weakened condition by the time the regiment had returned to New York. His wife later issued a statement to The New York Times expressing her late husband's views, telling one reporter,

My husband was starved to death. Think of it, for eight years he was in the service of the United States Army, and fought at Santiago leading Company E up San Juan Hill side by side with Capt. Rafferty, his friend – and now in return for his bravery and courage this Government starves him to death. He returned two weeks ago, a skeleton of his former self. The Government of those four months paid him just $18. How do they expect a man, who for patriotism and love for his country fight for her in time of need, can support his family and live himself on $18 in four months?

The Red Cross Society, upon hearing of her circumstances, organized for money and other services to be provided for Mrs. Ziegner.

On July 29, 1993, during a congressional hearing on the Wounded Knee National Memorial, Ziegner's status as an MOH recipient was questioned by Senator Ben Nighthorse Campbell, who suggested that the soldiers who received the award at Wounded Knee should have their medals rescinded.

== Controversy ==
Mass Grave for the Dead Lakota After the Engagement at Wounded Knee

There have been several attempts by various parties to rescind the Medals of Honor awarded in connection with the Battle of Wounded Knee. Proponents claim that the engagement was in-fact a massacre and not a battle, due to the high number of killed and wounded Lakota women and children and the very one-sided casualty counts. Estimates of the Lakota losses indicate 150–300 killed, of which up to 200 were women and children. Additionally, as many as 51 were wounded. In contrast, the 7th Cavalry suffered 25 killed and 39 wounded, many being the result of friendly fire.

Calvin Spotted Elk, direct descendant of Chief Spotted Elk killed at Wounded Knee, launched a petition to rescind medals from the soldiers who participated in the battle.

The Army has also been criticized more generally for the seemingly disproportionate number of Medals of Honor awarded in connection with the battle. For comparison, 20 Medals were awarded at Wounded Knee, 21 at the Battle of Cedar Creek, and 20 at the Battle of Antietam. Respectively, Cedar Creek and Antietam involved 52,712 and 113,000 troops, suffering 8,674 and 22,717 casualties. Wounded Knee, however, involved 610 combatants and resulted in as many as 705 casualties (including non-combatants).

== See also ==
- List of Medal of Honor recipients
