= John Francis O'Sullivan =

Irish-born soldier

- Born: c. 1850; County Kerry, Ireland
- Died: May 19, 1907 (aged 57); Queens, New York, United States
- Burial place: Calvary Cemetery
- Military career
- Allegiance: United States of America
- Branch: United States Army
- Service years: 1870–c. 1875
- Rank: Private
- Unit: 4th U.S. Cavalry
- Conflicts: Indian Wars; Texas–Indian Wars
- Awards: Medal of Honor

John Francis O'Sullivan (c. 1850 – May 19, 1907) was an Irish-born soldier who emigrated to New York City, where he joined the United States Army who served with the 4th U.S. Cavalry during the Texas–Indian Wars. He received the Medal of Honor for gallantry against a hostile band of Indians at the Staked Plains in Texas on December 8, 1874.

== Biography ==
John Francis O'Sullivan was born in County Kerry, southern Ireland in about 1850. He eventually emigrated to the United States where he enlisted in the U.S. Army in New York City, New York on March 22, 1870. O'Sullivan became a member of the 4th U.S. Cavalry and saw action during the Texas-Indian Wars of the 1870s. On December 8, 1874, he was part of a cavalry detachment that was pursuing 10 Indians through the Muchague Valley. In the course of the chase the Indians suddenly dismounted and took up positions to fire upon the soldiers. He and fellow Private Frederick Bergendahl distinguished themselves in this battle, and after nearly all the renegades had been killed, O'Sullivan pursued the last surviving Indian but was unable to catch him. Both Bergendahl and O'Sullivan were received the Medal of Honor, as well as Lieutenant Lewis Warrington, for gallantry at the Staked Plains on October 13, 1875. After leaving the military, O'Sullivan returned to New York where he died on May 19, 1907, at the age of 57. He was buried at Calvary Cemetery in Queens, New York. A memorial marker was erected in his memory at Fort Concho National Historic Landmark in San Angelo, Texas.

== Medal of Honor citation ==
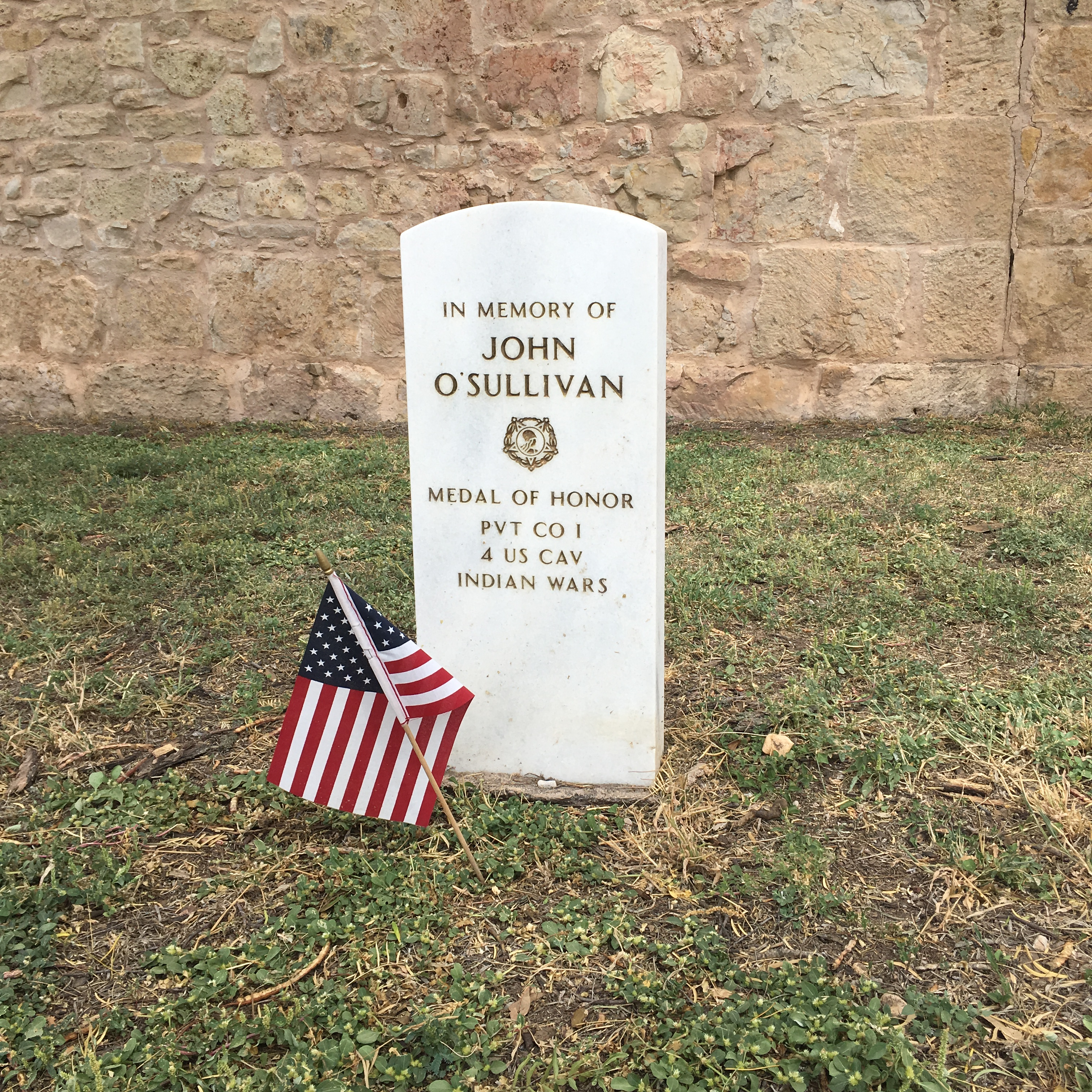
Memorial headstone located at Fort Concho, San Angelo, Texas, base of the 4th Cavalry

Rank and organization: Private, Company I, 4th U.S. Cavalry. Place and date: At Staked Plains, Tex., 8 December 1874. Entered service at New York, N.Y. Birth: Ireland. Date of issue: 13 October 1875.

Citation:

Gallantry in a long chase after Indians.

== See also ==
- List of Medal of Honor recipients for the Indian Wars
