= Haunted Studio =

Canadian music variety television series

- Genre: Music
- Country of origin: Canada
- Original language: English
- No. of seasons: 1
- No. of episodes: 6

Production
- Producer: Peter Macfarlane
- Running time: 30 minutes

Original release
- Network: CBC Television
- Release: 22 July – 2 September 1954

Haunted Studio is a Canadian music variety television program that aired on CBC Television in 1954.

== Premise ==
The program was recorded at the same studio as used for The Big Revue, except that it was reduced to a minimalist stage devoid of backdrops or furniture except for a few basic seats or props.

Regular performers included Esther Ghan (vocals), Jerry Hicks (theremin) and a vocal group featuring The Esquires with two female vocalists. Jack Kane led the show's music while Don Gillies served as choreographer.

== Scheduling ==
This half-hour series was broadcast on Thursdays at 10:30 p.m. (Eastern) from 22 July to 2 September 1954. A series pilot was produced in late 1953 featuring Art Hallman (singer), Budd Knapp (actor) and Margo McKinnon (singer).
