= Charles Novello =

American politician

Charles Novello (May 12, 1886 – November 4, 1935) was an American lawyer and politician from New York.

== Life ==
Novello was born on May 12, 1886, in New York City, New York, the son of Andrew Novello and Carmela Depiero. His parents were Italian immigrants.

Novello attended New York Law School and was admitted to the bar in 1908. He clerked in the office of James A. Foley after he graduated law school. He became a practicing lawyer in 1910.

In 1911, Novello unsuccessfully ran for the New York State Assembly as a Republican in the New York County 28th District. He lost the election to Democrat Jacob Levy. In 1912, he unsuccessfully again ran in the 28th District with support from the Republican Party and the Independence League, losing the election to Democrat Salvatore A. Cotillo. He was elected to the 28th District in 1916 and served in the Assembly in 1917.

Novello served on the New York City Board of Aldermen from 1920 to 1921 and was at one point the Republican candidate for County Clerk. He was an alternate delegate to the 1920 and 1924 Republican National Conventions. He was a presidential elector in the 1924 presidential election.

Novello was vice-president of the Republican Club of the Eighteenth Assembly District, North, and was a member of the National Republican Club and the New York County Lawyers' Association. He had a daughter named Frances.

Novello died at home from a long illness on November 4, 1935. He was buried in Calvary Cemetery.

New York State Assembly
Preceded by Salvatore A. Cotillo	New York State Assembly; New York County, 28th District; 1917	Succeeded by District Abolished
