= William Conner (disambiguation) =

William Conner (1777–1855) was an American trader, interpreter, scout, community leader, entrepreneur, and politician.

William Conner may also refer to:

- William C. Conner, American judge
- William Conner (Irish politician), Irish politician
- William Conner (Mississippi politician), speaker of the Mississippi Territory House of Representatives
- Bill Conner, American businessman
- W. W. Conner (William Wallace Conner), American politician in the state of Washington

== See also ==
- William Connor (disambiguation)
