= Thomas Burke (Medal of Honor soldier) =

American soldier

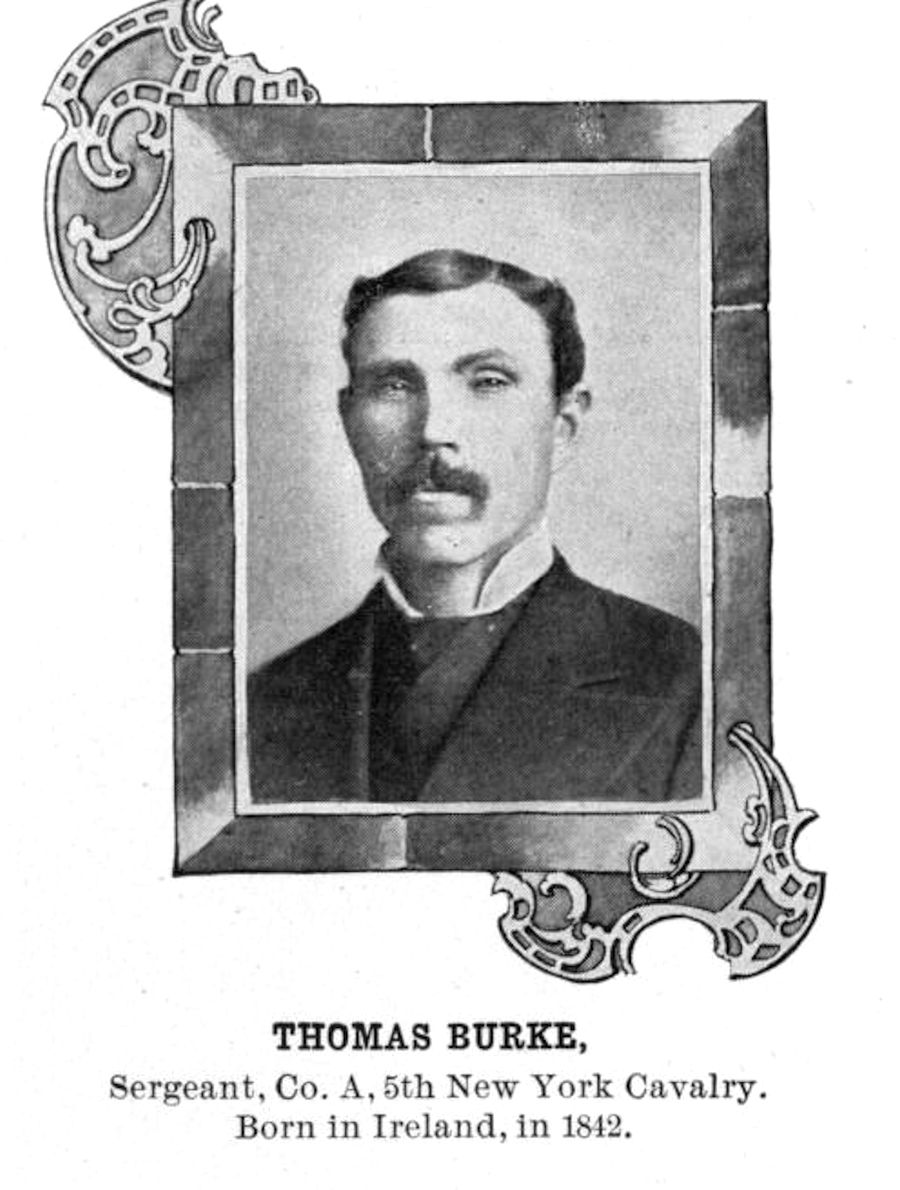
- Sgt. Thomas M. Burke, Company A, 5th New York Cavalry
- Born: 1842; Ireland
- Died: March 15, 1902 (aged 59–60); New York City, US
- Military career
- Allegiance: United States
- Branch: United States Army
- Service years: 1861 - 1864
- Rank: Private
- Units: Company A, 5th Regiment New York Volunteer Cavalry
- Awards: Medal of Honor

Private Thomas M. Burke (1842 – March 15, 1902) was an American soldier who fought in the American Civil War. Burke received the United States' highest award for bravery during combat, the Medal of Honor, for his action at Hanover, Pennsylvania on June 30, 1863.

== Personal life ==
Burke was born in Ireland in April 1842. (Note: There is a discrepancy in Burke's year of birth. In all his pension and census paperwork, his birth year is listed as 1842, yet in his enlistment, it lists his age as 24.) When he was seventeen, he emigrated to New York City in 1858.

== Military service ==
=== 1861 ===
In the summer of 1861, he enlisted as a private in Company A, 5th New York Cavalry at New York City. With his company, he went to Camp Scott on Staten Island where the regiment was organizing. Burke mustered into Federal service with his company on October 15.

As one of the first volunteer cavalry regiments in the state, the regiment was organized into three battalions of four companies making a total of twelve companies By the end of October 1861, the regiment included 50 officers and 1,064 enlisted men. Two of the regiment's three battalions received horses during October. On November 18, the regiment moved by train to Baltimore, where the Third Battalion received its horses and equipment. On November 25, as a mounted trooper, Burke marched with his regiment Annapolis. They established a winter quarters camp nearby (Camp Harris) where more drills were conducted.

=== 1862 ===
In March, Burke and his regiment were sent to join Bank's V Corps in the Shenandoah Valley. They fought against Jackson's army. (Note: In this period, Burke's regiment was in Brig. Gen. Hatch's cavalry brigade alongside the 2nd Batta;ion/1st Maine, the 1st Maryland, and the 1st Vermont cavalry regiments.)In July, Bank's V Corps became II Corps of Pope's Army of Virginia during the Northern Virginia Campaign. On August 24 and 25, the regiment was involved in the First Battle of Rappahannock Station where they were on Pope's right flank.

During the Second Battle of Bull Run, Burke and his company acted as escorts for Pope's headquarters. After the defeat, Burke and his regiment spent the next six months in the defenses of Washington and ranging from there to the Blue Ridge Mountains in anti-guerilla warfre against, among others, Mosby's Rangers, who were under the command of John S. Mosby.

=== 1863 ===
In April 1863, the regiment became part of the 3d Brigade, Stahel's Cavalry Division, XXII Army Corps. On May 3, the 5th New York faced Mosby again—this time at Warrenton Junction. About 40 men from the regiment, led by Major Hammond, surprised Mosby's men after they had surprised a detachment of about 100 men from the 1st (West) Virginia Cavalry. Most of Mosby's prisoners were rescued, and Mosby had significant losses.

Burke and his regiment were soon swept up in the Gettysburgcampaign In early June, his cavalry division detached from Washington to the Army of the Potomac (AoP) to counter Lee's Army of Northern Virginia. On June 28, the army was reorganized, and the cavalry division the 3rd Division of the Cavalry Corps, AoP. Brig. Gen. Kilpatrick was the new division's commander, and the division was detached eastward as the army moved from Frederick, Maryland, to Pennsylvania.

At the Battle of Hanover on June 30, Burke's regiment was the penultimate in line of march when therear regiment was attacked by rebel cavalry under Maj. GenStuart. After close fighting, the Confederates withdrew to the cover of their artillery in the hills leaving the streets full of dead and wounded men and horses. Kilpatrick directed a counterattack by portions of Farnsworth's First Brigade and Custer's Second Brigade. Burke earned the Medal of Honor when he captured the flag of the 13th Virginia Cavalry while capturing and disarming two Confederates, and he was presented it to Kilpatrick. The counterattack silenced the Confederate big guns, and Stuart's men were driven toward Lee's army. The 5th New York had one officer killed and one officer wounded. Casualties for enlisted men were more numerous: 4 killed, 29 wounded, and 18 became prisoners.

Burke, now a sergeant, was with the regiment at Gettysburg where it guarded the left wing of the army, about 2.5 miles (4.0 km) from Gettysburg south of Little Round Top. After the Battle of Gettysburg, during Lee's retreat, the 5th New York Cavalry suffered significant casualties on July 6 in the Battle of Williamsport (also known as Battle of Hagerstown) in Hagerstown, Maryland, (near the road to Williamsport) where with the 1st Vermont Cavalry, the two regiments were flanked on both sides, outnumbered, and eventually driven back. Burke's unit had 2 officers wounded and 3 officers captured, and 3 enlisted men killed, 8 wounded, and 54 captured. Burke's command skirmished at Hagerstown again on July 11. After Lee's army crossed the Potomac on July 14, the AoP eventually crossed back to Virginia, and Burke's division was posted near Warrenton where ut saw no contact until a skirmish at Ashby's Gap on July 26.

For the Bristoe campaign beginning October 10, Burke's regiment was in the First Brigade of Kilpatrick's 3rd Division commanded by Brigadier General Davies. After initial success, portions of Kilpatrick's division were partially surrounded on October 19 in the Battle of Buckland Mills. Without the brigade's skill and daring the "entire command would have been annihilated," and the Union cavalry escaped with Burke's unit fighting off attacking infantry. The next month, in the Mine Run Campaign (began November 26), Brig. Gen. George A. Custer replaced Davies who remained in command of 1st Brigade. The regiment faced artillery duels and cold, wet weather, and one of its battalions held off the enemy at Raccoon Ford for six days.

On December 3, 1863, the regiment set up camp near Stevensburg, Virginia.

=== 1864 ===
On February 28, 1864, detachments from the 2nd New York, 5th New York, 1st Vermont, 1st Maine, and 5th Michigan departed Stevensburg, for a special mission under the command of Colonel Ulric Dahlgren and consisted of 400 men. The detachment from Burke's regiment were 40 men from companies I and K. Kilpatrick's main Union force (with Burke and the rest of his regiment) would attack Richmond from the north as a diversion, while Dahlgren's command approached from the south. Dahlgren's goal was to liberate prisoners in several prisons (including Libby Prison), destroy mills and warehouses, destroy railroad communications, and capture artillery at Frederick Hall Station on the Virginia Central Railroad. The mission failed and Dahlgren was killed. There was some controversy over some papers allegedly found on Dahlgren's body that discussed killing Jefferson Davis and burning Richmond. However, both Meade and Kilpatrick said nothing like that was "authorized, sanctioned, or approved".

During March, Ulysses S. Grant became commander of all Union armed forces. Although Grant decided not to replace Meade as commander of the Army of the Potomac, he kept his headquarters with Meade's and provided direction. Philip Sheridan was appointed commander of Meade's cavalry corps. Kilpatrick was assigned to a larger command out west, and he was replaced as commander of Sheridan's 3rd Division by General James H. Wilson. Colonel John B. McIntosh replaced Davies as commander of the cavalry division's First Brigade—which consisted of the 18th Pennsylvania, 1st Connecticut, 2nd New York, and 5th New York cavalries.

At the Battle of the Wilderness, on May 4, as the Cavalry Division moved on the Plank Road toward Chancellorsville, the 5th was detached and sent down the Orange Plank Road to Parker's Store to guard an approach from the west. The next day, as the remainder of the division moved southward, it patrolled the area. While the regiment ate breakfast at Parker's Store, Company I probed west and made contact with Confederate infantry. In dismounted skirmishing, the company, joined by the regiment, discovered it was fighting Hill's entire infantry corps. Burke's regiment, only about 500 men, fought dismounted in a skirmish line using their Spencer carbines' greater firepower in a slow, delaying retreat east beyond the Orange Plank Road until relieved by infantry from Getty's 2nd Division of VI Corps. Nearly out of ammunition, Burke's regiment was sent about 1 mile (1.6 km) to the rear to resupply after a desperate five-hour engagement against a much larger force suffering significant casualties. This delaying action prevented Hill from cutting off Hancock's II Corps, and the fire from the Spencers led the Confederates to believe they had been fighting an entire brigade. The Wilderness continued through May 7 and finished as a draw. For the next two weeks, the fighting shifted southeast toward Spotsylvania Court House. On May 7, the regiment guarded Germania Plank Road. Although the regiment's casualties for Spotsylvania were few, the two battles' combined casualties were the regiment's third highest in the American Civil War.

In the Battle of Cold Harbor, which lasted May 31 through June 12, the 5th New York was at Ashland Station on the Virginia Central Railroad to destroy two railroad bridges over the North Anna River. The fighting was fierce and part of the First Brigade was temporarily surrounded before fighting its way to safety. In this portion of the battle, losses for both sides were heavy.

On June 22, Burke's regiment went on the Wilson-Kautz Raid to "cut the enemy's lines of communication south." Wilson's division used lesser-traveled roads to move south and west to "avoid the observation of the enemy", and targets included the rail line that ran from Petersburg to Lynchburg and the Richmond and Danville Railroad. By June 26, the force could not capture the Staunton River bridge near Roanoke Station, and could not continue southward along the rail line. On the return trip, Wilson lost two battles and found his path back blocked by Confederate troops. In the desperate escape, artillery was spiked, supply wagons burned, and ambulances were abandoned with wounded that would become prisoners. A Confederate infantry attack caused Burke's half of the raid under Kautz to become separated from Wilson. Some men did not reach the safety of Union lines until July 8. The failed 350-mile raid destroyed some railroad track but cost 1,445 casualties out of a force of 5,500 men. The regiment rested and regrouped for several days in early July. Many men were sent to hospitals, and almost 100 men had no horse. The dismounted men were sent to a camp in the District of Columbia and eventually fought at Maryland Heights, Rockville, Toll Gate, Poolesville, Snicker's Ferry, and Kernstown.

Beginning in August, Burke fought in Sheridan's Shenandoah Valley Campaign. On August 13, Burke's regiment proceeded through Leesburg and Snicker's Gap and reached Sheridan's Army of the Shenandoah near Opequon Creek about 2 miles (3.2 km) from Winchester after travelling about 75 miles (121 km) in 22 hours. The regiment was in the Battle of Summit Point on August 21 but did not have multiple casualties until the "furious fighting" at Kearneysville Station on August 25. Skirmishing for the next few weeks was at Berryville and Opequon Creek. At the Battle of Opequon, or the Third Battle of Winchester, a Union victory on September 19, Burke's regiment followed the 2nd New York leading the initial advance in this battle during which it made five charges, including four against infantry. The regiment spent the next few days pursuing Confederates while having few casualties. In early October, Custer replaced Wilson as division commander as it retreated down the valley burning anything the Confederate army could use. Enemy cavalry attacks on the rear guard led Sheridan to order Torbert to "whip the rebel cavalry or get whipped himself". Torbert had Merritt's 1st Division to attack Lomax's cavalry and Custer's 3rd to attack Rosser. On October 9, near Toms Brook, Custer personally led the Burke's unit in a highly successful attack leading to victory and causing a quick Confederate retreat some called the "Woodstock Races".

On October 15, Sgt. Burke and other troopers who had not reenlisted mustered out and returned to New York.

== Medal of Honor citation ==
The President of the United States of America, in the name of Congress, takes pleasure in presenting the Medal of Honor to Private Thomas Burke, United States Army, for extraordinary heroism on 30 June 1863, while serving with Company A, 5th New York Cavalry, in action at Hanover Courthouse (Gettysburg Battle), Virginia, for capture of battle flag.

== Post war ==
Burke returned to New York, and in 1870, he married fellow Irish immigrant, Sarah Cavanaugh from Offaly but had no children.

In the ongoing review of official records in the 1890s, he was nominated for his actions in 1863. The 37-year-old Burke received his Medal of Honor on February 11, 1878. By the 1880 census, he had moved to 8 Cannon St, Bridgeport, Connecticut, and was working as a teamster. On January 29, 1891, Burke and his wife filed for his Civil War Pension. At that time, he was still working, but had moved to 405 Rail Road Avenue in Bridgeport. By the 1900 census, the childless couple housed the 18-year-old teamster son one his wife's brother Charles, Henry "Harry" Cavanagh, who was born in Manchester, England and had immigrated the year before. They also had a 22-year-old cousin of Burke's, Delia Lyons, who had immigrated at 17 in 1894 from Ireland and was working as a silk weaver.

Burke died at 60, on March 5, 1902.

== See also ==
- 5th New York Cavalry Regiment
- New York in the Civil War
