= Dennis Conlan =

American soldier who received the Medal of Honor

- Born: 1838; New York, New York
- Died: December 2, 1870 (aged 31–32); Woodside, New York
- Burial place: Calvary Cemetery
- Military career
- Allegiance: United States of America
- Branch: United States Navy
- Rank: Seaman
- Unit: (New York (state)) United States Navy
- Conflicts: First Battle of Fort Fisher
- Awards: Medal of Honor

Seaman Dennis Conlan (1838 – December 2, 1870) was an American soldier who fought in the American Civil War. Conlan received the country's highest award for bravery during combat, the Medal of Honor, for his action aboard the Agawam during the First Battle of Fort Fisher on 23 December 1864. He was honored with the award on 31 December 1864.

== Biography ==
Conlan was born in New York, New York in 1838. He enlisted into the United States Navy. He died on 2 December 1870 and his remains are interred at the Calvary Cemetery in New York.

== Medal of Honor citation ==
Conlan served on board the U.S.S. Agawam, as one of a volunteer crew of a powder boat which was exploded near Fort Fisher, 23 December 1864. The powder boat, towed in by the Wilderness to prevent detection by the enemy, cast off and slowly steamed to within 300 yards of the beach. After fuses and fires had been lit and a second anchor with short scope let go to assure the boat's tailing inshore, the crew again boarded the Wilderness and proceeded a distance of 12 miles from shore. Less than 2 hours later the explosion took place, and the following day fires were observed still burning at the forts.

== See also ==
- List of American Civil War Medal of Honor recipients: A–F
