= George W. Ford (Irish soldier) =

American Medal of Honor recipient (1844–1883)

- Civil War era Army Medal of Honor
- Born: c. 1844; Ireland
- Died: November 29, 1883; New York City
- Burial place: Calvary Cemetery
- Military career
- Allegiance: United States of America
- Branch: United States Army
- Service years: 1861 - 1865
- Rank: First Lieutenant
- Unit: (New York (state)) 88th New York Volunteer Infantry Regiment
- Conflicts: Battle of Sayler's Creek
- Awards: Medal of Honor

George W. Ford (c. 1844 – November 29, 1883) was an Irish soldier who fought in the American Civil War. Ford received the United States' highest award for bravery during combat the Medal of Honor, for his action during the Battle of Sayler's Creek in Virginia on 6 April 1865. He was honored with the award on 10 May 1865.

== Biography ==
Ford was born in Ireland in about 1844. He joined the 88th New York Infantry as a sergeant in September 1861. He was commissioned as a first lieutenant in July 1864, and mustered out with his regiment in June 1865. He was a companion of the New York Commandery of the Military Order of the Loyal Legion of the United States.

Ford died on 29 November 1883 and his remains are interred at the Calvary Cemetery in Woodside, New York.

== Medal of Honor citation ==
The President of the United States of America, in the name of Congress, takes pleasure in presenting the Medal of Honor to First Lieutenant (Infantry) George W. Ford, United States Army, for extraordinary heroism on 6 April 1865, while serving with Company E, 88th New York Infantry, in action at Deatonsville (Sailor's Creek), Virginia, for capture of flag.

== See also ==
- List of American Civil War Medal of Honor recipients: A–F
