= Bill O'Connor (Australian footballer) =

Australian rules footballer

Personal information
- Full name: William Tanner O'Connor
- Born: 13 March 1908; Fitzroy, Victoria
- Died: 12 July 1989 (aged 81); Royal Melbourne Hospital, Parkville, Victoria
- Original team: Middle Park

Playing career^{1}
Years	Club	Games (Goals)
1929	South Melbourne	1 (0)
- ^{1} Playing statistics correct to the end of 1929.

William Tanner O'Connor (13 March 1908 – 12 July 1989) was an Australian rules footballer who played with South Melbourne in the Victorian Football League (VFL).

== Family ==
The son of John George O'Connor (1853–1916), and Mary Ann O'Connor (1871–1967), née Tanner, William Tanner O'Connor was born in Fitzroy, Victoria on 13 March 1908.

He married Millie Frances Veronica Tanner (1907–2005) in 1937. They had three children.

== Football ==
=== South Melbourne (VFL) ===
Recruited from the Middle Park Football Club, O'Connor played one game, on the half-forward flank, for the South Melbourne First XVIII, against Melbourne, at the MCG, on 27 April 1929.

== Military service ==
O'Connor enlisted in the Second AIF on 12 January 1942, and served during World War II.

== Death ==
He died at the Royal Melbourne Hospital in Parkville, Victoria on 12 July 1989.
