= Club O'Connor =

- Genre: Music
- Presented by: Don Cameron
- Starring: Billy O'Connor
- Country of origin: Canada
- Original language: English
- No. of seasons: 1

Production
- Producer: Syd Wayne
- Production location: Toronto
- Running time: 30 minutes

Original release
- Network: CBC Television
- Release: 7 June – 27 September 1957

Club O'Connor is a Canadian music variety television program that aired on CBC Television in 1957.

== Premise ==
This series featured pianist Billy O'Connor with a house band of Jackie Richardson (leader, bass), Vic Centro (accordion), Ken Gill (guitar), Johnny Lindon (drums, vocals) and Sylvia Murphy (vocals). Musical arrangements were created by Bill Isbister. Visiting artists during the series included Jack Duffy (comedian, vocalist, 19 July 1957), Jack Groob (violin, 28 June 1957), Hal Harvey, Joey Hollingsworth (dancer), Georges Lafleche (singer), Pat Rafferty (The Dumbbells), The Rhythmaires (21 June 1957) and the Taylor Twins (dancers, 5 July 1957).

== Scheduling ==
Club O'Connor occupied The Plouffe Family's time slot between seasons. This half-hour series was broadcast Fridays at 8:30 p.m. (Eastern time) from 7 June to 27 September 1957.
