= Bill O'Connor (basketball) =

American basketball coach

William Martin O'Connor or Bill O'Connor is a former basketball coach at Rockhurst University

== Early life ==
William Martin O'Connor was born on January 13, 1950, in Kansas City, Missouri, to John Joseph O'Connor and Martha Fetters O'Connor. Bill attended Rockhurst High School where he played varsity basketball. He continued to play at Benedictine College in Atchison, Kansas.

== Career ==
O'Connor started his career at Colby Community College as an assistant coach. He later was hired as an assistant coach at University of Texas-Pan American where he stayed for a short time before finding Rockhurst. In 1994 Bill was named head coach of the Rockhurst team, and led Rockhurst to multiple Great Lakes Valley Conference and Heartland Conference champions. He was named coach of the year multiple times in both the GLVC and the Heartland conference. O'Connor retired in 2015 as the winningest head coach in Rockhurst basketball history. He was inducted into the Greater Kansas City Basketball Coaches Association Hall of Fame on April 11, 2019.

== Personal life ==
He lives in Kansas City, Missouri, with his wife Elaine. He has 4 children, Tricia, Chris, Anna, and Caitlin.
