= William C. Connor =

- Born: 1832; County Cork, Ireland
- Died: January 12, 1912 (aged 79); Queens County, New York
- Military career
- Allegiance: United States of America
- Branch: United States Navy
- Rank: Boatswain's Mate
- Unit: (Pennsylvania)
- Awards: Medal of Honor

Boatswain's Mate William C. Connor (1832–1912) was an Irish soldier who fought in the American Civil War. Connor received the United States' highest award for bravery during combat, the Medal of Honor, for his action aboard the USS Howquah on 25 September 1864. He was honored with the award on 31 December 1864.

== Biography ==
Connor was born in County Cork, Ireland in 1832. He enlisted into the United States Navy.

== Medal of Honor citation ==
Served on board the U.S.S. Howquah on the occasion of the destruction of the blockade runner Lynx, off Wilmington, 25 September 1864. Performing his duty faithfully under the most trying circumstances, William Connor stood firmly at his post in the midst of a crossfire from the rebel shore batteries and our own vessels.

== See also ==
- List of American Civil War Medal of Honor recipients: A–F
