= The Billy O'Connor Show =

Canadian television series

- Starring: Billy O'Connor
- Country of origin: Canada
- Original language: English
- No. of seasons: 2

Production
- Producers: Drew Crossan; Bob Jarvis

Original release
- Network: CBC Television
- Release: 16 October 1954 – 19 May 1956

The Billy O'Connor Show is a Canadian variety television program that aired on CBC Television from 1954 to 1956.

== Premise ==
Billy O'Connor, a jazz musician, hosted this series with a small house band - Vic Centro (accordion), Kenny Gill (guitar) and Jackie Richardson (bass). Jack Duffy and Bill Isbister also made frequent appearances on this series. O'Connor was promoted in CBC publicity as "a man you'd like to get to know".

Juliette joined O'Connor on the series as a regular performer from 20 August 1955. However, their adversarial relationship led to the end of O'Connor's series in May 1956 and the debut of Juliette's own series in the same time slot that October. Sylvia Murphy became the vocalist for future series with O'Connor.

== Scheduling ==
This 20-minute series was broadcast on Saturdays at 11:10 p.m. from 16 October 1954 to 19 May 1956, following the NHL hockey broadcast.
