= List of Native American Medal of Honor recipients =

This is a list of Native Americans awarded the nation's highest military decoration – the Medal of Honor. The Medal of Honor is bestowed "for conspicuous gallantry and intrepidity at the risk of life, above and beyond the call of duty, in actual combat against an armed enemy force." The medal is awarded by the President of the United States on behalf of the Congress.

Of the 3,469 Medals of Honor awarded as of 2010, 29 have been awarded to Native Americans.

The Medal of Honor was created during the American Civil War and is the highest military decoration presented by the United States government to a member of its armed forces. The recipient must have distinguished themselves at the risk of their own life above and beyond the call of duty in action against an enemy of the United States. Due to the nature of this medal, it is commonly presented posthumously.

== List of recipients ==
This along with * indicates that the Medal of Honor was awarded posthumously
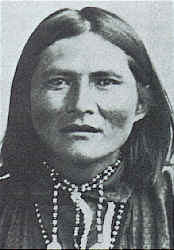
William Alchesay

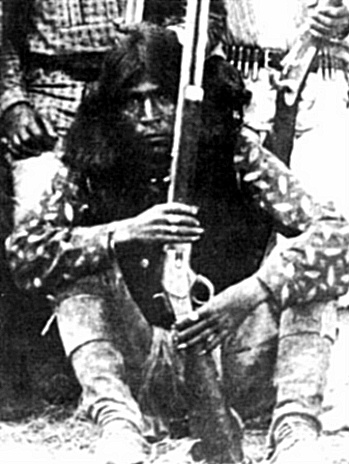
Elsatsoosu

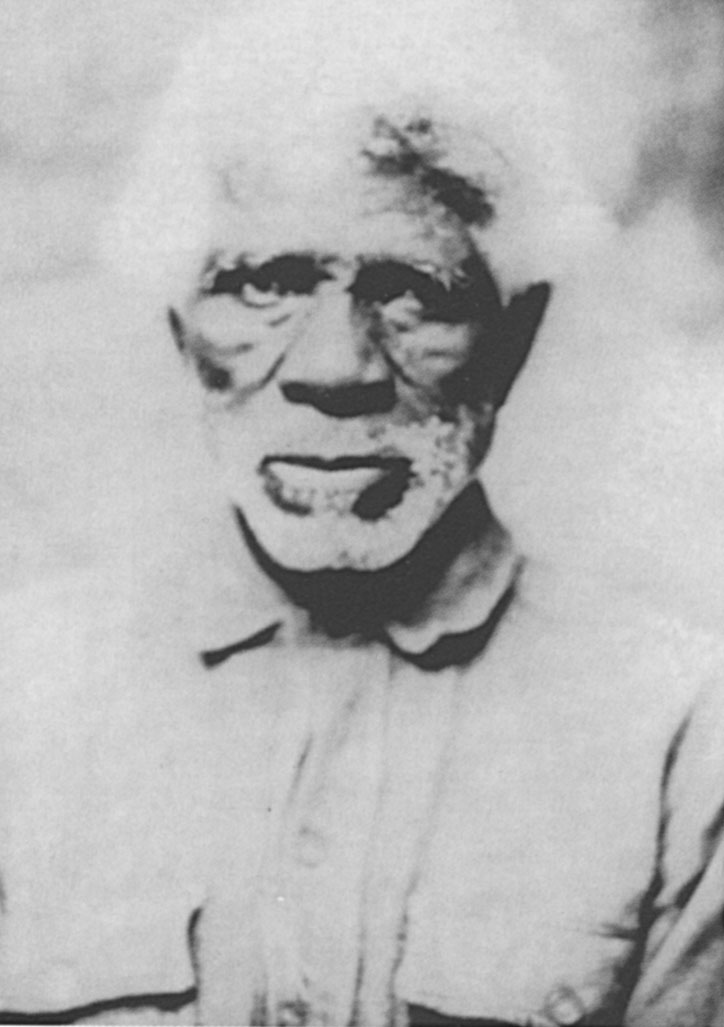
Pompey Factor

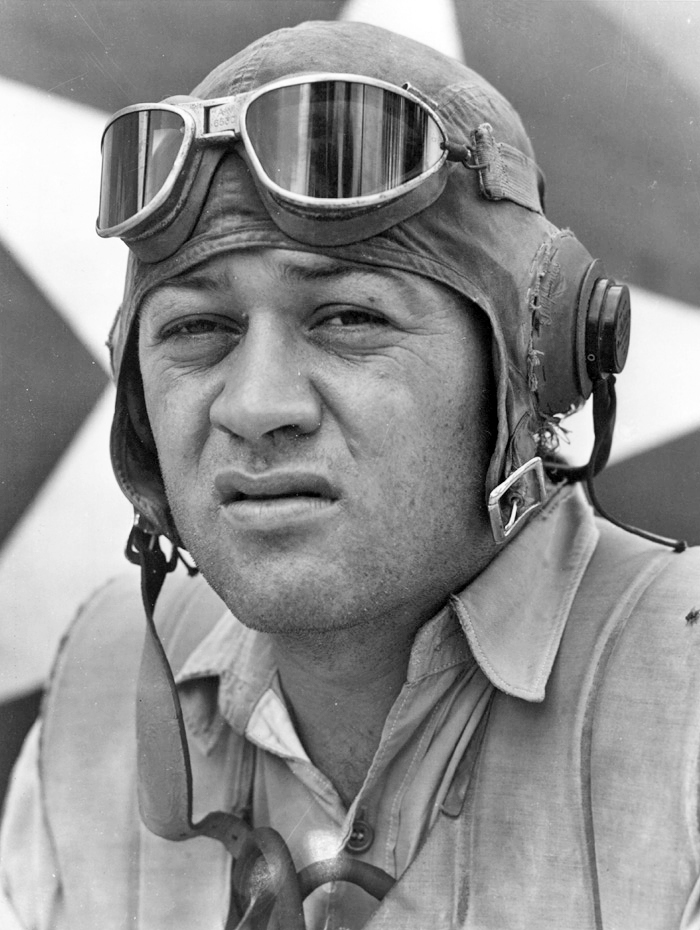
Gregory "Pappy" Boyington

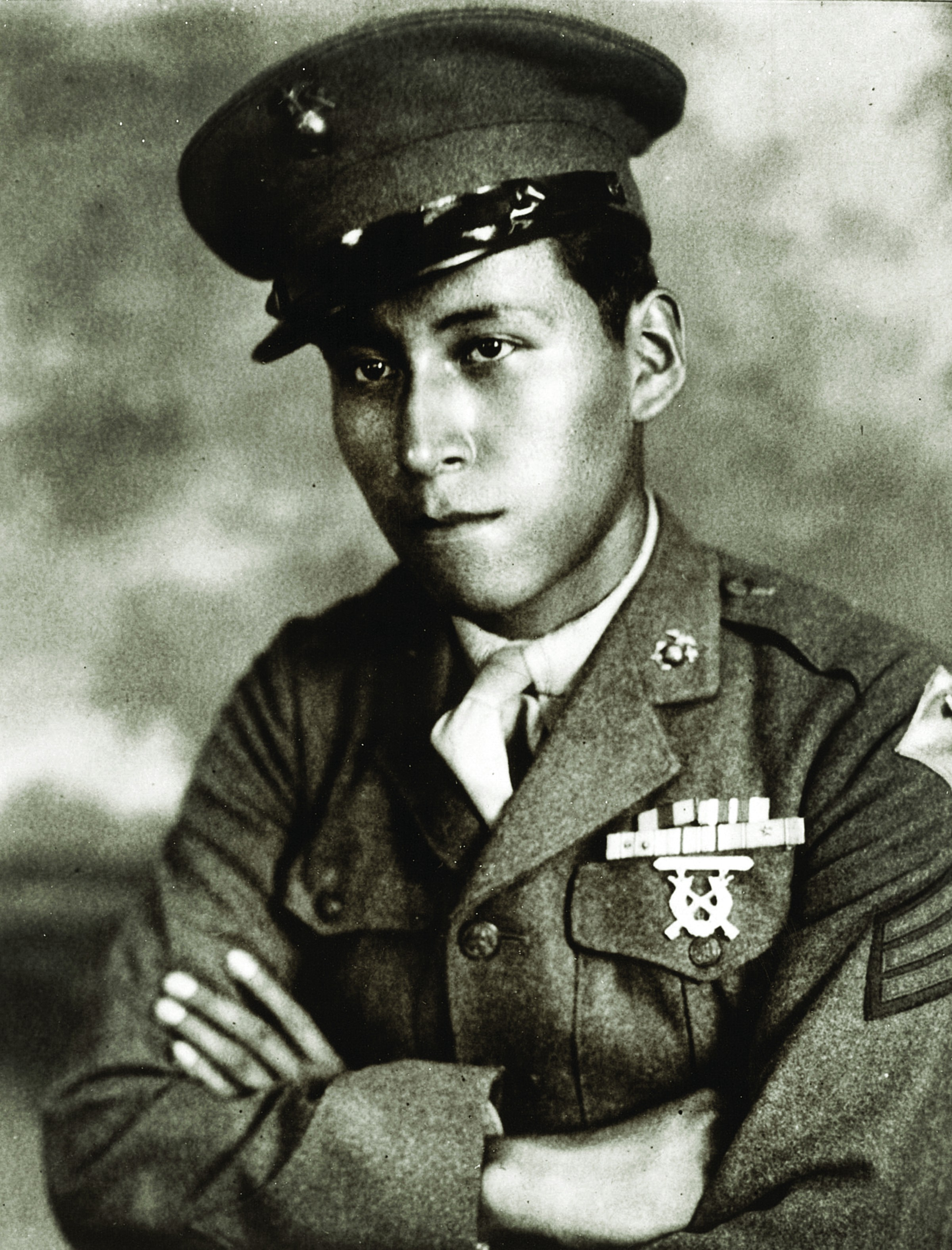
Mitchell Red Cloud

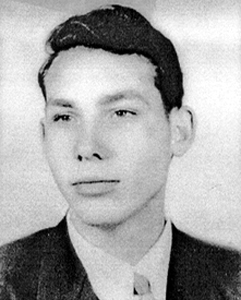
Tony Burris

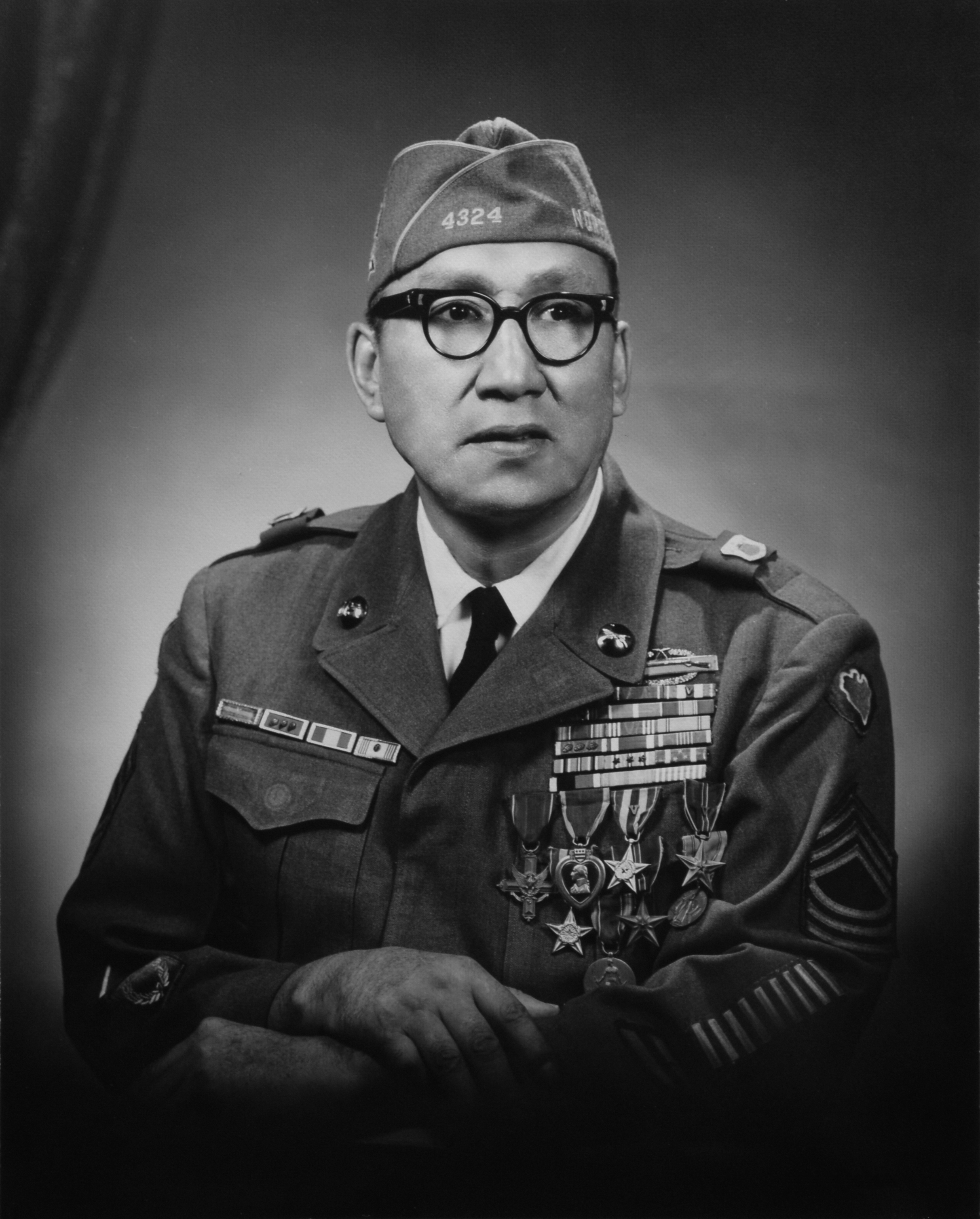
Woodrow Keeble

Name	Tribe/Nation	Service	Rank	Conflict	Place of action	Date of action	Notes
Co-Rux-Te-Chod-Ish	Pawnee	Army	Sergeant	Indian Wars	Republican River, Kansas	July 8, 1869	"Ran out from the command in pursuit of a dismounted Indian; was shot down and badly wounded by a bullet from his own command"
Chiquito	White Mountain Apache	Army	Scout	Indian Wars	Arizona Territory	Winter of 1871–1873	For his "conduct during campaigns and engagements with Apaches"
Jim	White Mountain Apache	Army	Sergeant	Indian Wars	—	Winter of 1871–1873	For his "conduct during campaigns and engagements with Apaches"
Machol	Apache	Army	Private	Indian Wars	Arizona Territory	1872–1873	For his "conduct during campaigns and engagements with Apaches"
Nannasaddie	White Mountain Apache	Army	Scout	Indian Wars	Arizona Territory	1872–1873	For his "conduct during campaigns and engagements with Apaches"
Nantaje	White Mountain Apache	Army	Scout	Indian Wars	Arizona Territory	1872–1873	For his "conduct during campaigns and engagements with Apaches"
William Alchesay	White Mountain Apache	Army	Sergeant	Indian Wars	Arizona Territory	Winter of 1872–1873	For his "conduct during campaigns and engagements with Apaches"
Blanquet	Apache	Army	Scout	Indian Wars	Arizona Territory	Winter of 1872–1873	For his "conduct during campaigns and engagements with Apaches"
Elsatsoosu	Apache	Army	Corporal	Indian Wars	Arizona Territory	Winter of 1872–1873	For his "conduct during campaigns and engagements with Apaches"
Kelsay	White Mountain Apache	Army	Scout	Indian Wars	Arizona Territory	Winter of 1872–1873	For his "conduct during campaigns and engagements with Apaches"
Kosoha	White Mountain Apache	Army	Scout	Indian Wars	Arizona Territory	Winter of 1872–1873	For his "conduct during campaigns and engagements with Apaches"
Adam Paine	Black Seminole	Army	Private	Indian Wars	Canyon Blanco tributary of the Red River, Texas	September 26, 1874 – September 27, 1874	"Rendered invaluable service to Col. R. S. Mackenzie, 4th U.S. Cavalry, during this engagement"
Pompey Factor	Black Seminole	Army	Private	Indian Wars	Pecos River, Texas	April 25, 1875	With three others, charged a numerically superior force
Isaac Payne	Black Seminole	Army	Trumpeter	Indian Wars	Pecos River, Texas	April 25, 1875	With three others, charged a numerically superior force
John Ward	Black Seminole	Army	Sergeant	Indian Wars	Pecos River, Texas	April 25, 1875	With three others, charged a numerically superior force
Rowdy	Apache	Army	Sergeant	Indian Wars	Arizona Territory	March 7, 1890	
Pappy Boyington	Sioux	Marine Corps	Major	World War II	Central Solomons area, Pacific Ocean	September 12, 1943 – January 3, 1944	Led his squadron in a series of missions against superior numbers
Ernest Childers	Muscogee	Army	Second Lieutenant	World War II	Oliveto, Italy	September 22, 1943	Although injured, killed two snipers and attacked two machine gun nests
Jack C. Montgomery	Cherokee	Army	First Lieutenant	World War II	near Padiglione, Italy	February 22, 1944	Single-handedly attacked two German positions and took dozens of prisoners
Van T. Barfoot	Choctaw	Army	Technical Sergeant	World War II	near Carano, Italy	May 23, 1944	Single-handedly destroyed two machine gun nests, took prisoners, and disabled a tank
Roy W. Harmon*		Army	Sergeant	World War II	near Casaglia, Italy	July 12, 1944	Single-handedly attacked three German positions although wounded
Ernest E. Evans*	Cherokee/Muscogee	Navy	Commander	World War II	off Samar, Philippines	October 25, 1944	In battle off Samar, where a major portion of the Japanese Battle fleet surprised the Taffy 3 escort carrier task unit, Evans immediately attacked with his single destroyer, the Johnston, against overwhelming odds. At the cost of his own life, his ship, and much of his crew, they helped to inflict the amazing defeat on the enemy battleships and cruisers by a far inferior American force.
John N. Reese, Jr.*		Army	Private First Class	World War II	Paco Railroad Station, Manila, Philippines	February 9, 1945	With another soldier, attacked a Japanese-held railroad station
Mitchell Red Cloud, Jr.*	Ho-Chunk	Army	Corporal	Korean War	near Chonghyon, Korea	November 5, 1950	Maintained an exposed position, continued to fight after being wounded
Raymond Harvey	Chickasaw	Army	Captain	Korean War	near Taemi-Dong, Korea	March 9, 1951	Led his men against a series of emplacements, continued to lead after being wounded
Tony K. Burris*	Choctaw	Army	Sergeant First Class	Korean War	near Mundung-ni, Korea	October 8, 1951 – October 9, 1951	Single-handedly attacked two positions although wounded, killed while attacking a third
Woodrow W. Keeble*	Sioux	Army	Master Sergeant	Korean War	near Sangsan-ni, Korea	October 20, 1951	Single-handedly attacked three machine gun nests
Charles George*	Cherokee	Army	Private First Class	Korean War	near Songnae-dong, Korea	November 30, 1952	Smothered the blast of a grenade with his body
James E. Williams	Cherokee	Navy	Boatswain's Mate 1st Class	Vietnam War	Mekong River, South Vietnam	October 31, 1966	Destroyed 65 boats and over 1,000 enemy
Michael E. Thornton	Cherokee	Navy	Petty Officer 2nd Class	Vietnam War	South Vietnam	October 31, 1972	Through a hail of fire he succeeded in removing his seriously wounded superior officer then towed him two hours in the water until being rescued
Albert Earnest Schwab*	Chippewa/Wyandotte	Marine Corps	Private First Class	World War II	Ryukyu Islands	May 7, 1945	At the cost of his life, destroyed two strategic gun positions allowing his company to advance
