= Jim (Medal of Honor, 1873) =

Apache Indian scout (1850 – c. 1897)

- Born: Bow-os-loh c. 1850; Arizona Territory
- Died: c. 1897; Arizona Territory
- Military career
- Allegiance: United States of America
- Branch: United States Army
- Service years: c. 1872–1875
- Rank: Sergeant
- Unit: U.S. Army Indian Scouts
- Conflicts: Indian Wars; Apache Wars
- Awards: Medal of Honor

Jim "The Great" (c. 1850 – c. 1897), born Bow-os-loh, was an Apache Native American scout in the U.S. Army who served under Lieutenant Colonel George Crook during the Apache Wars. He guided cavalry troopers against renegade Apaches in the Arizona Territory during Crook's winter campaign of 1872-73 and was one of ten scouts later awarded the Medal of Honor for gallantry.

== Biography ==
Born Bow-os-loh in the Arizona Territory, Jim was a member of the White Mountain Apache. In late-1872, he and nine other Apaches were hired by the U.S. Army as an Indian scout for Lieutenant Colonel George Crook's campaign against renegades still active in Arizona following the surrender of Cochise earlier that year. Jim and the other scouts guided cavalry troopers in the Tonto Basin where the Western Apache and Yavapais had been successfully conducting raids and eluding troops for several years. During Crook's winter campaign of 1872–73, Jim was cited for gallantry battling the Apache in the mountains. Of the 23 men who received the Medal of Honor, Jim and all 10 Indian scouts received the award for "gallant conduct during campaigns and engagements with Apaches". The other scouts included William Alchesay, Blanquet, Chiquito, Elsatsoosu, Kelsay, Kosoha, Machol, Nannasaddie and Nantaje. Most of the Apache scouts, save for William Alchesay, disappeared from public record soon after the expedition. The death of Jim was not reported until 30 years later when his widow applied for his army pension in 1927.

== See also ==
- List of Medal of Honor recipients for the Indian Wars
