= Elsatsoosu =

US Army Medal of Honor recipient from the Apache Wars (fl. 1872–1875)

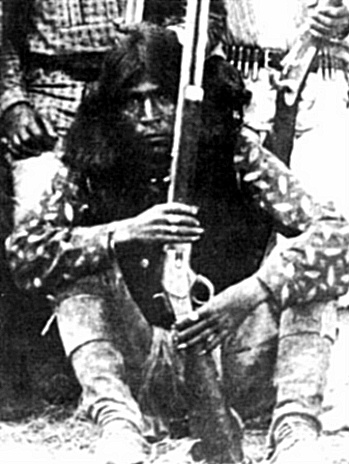
- Elsatsoosu c. 1873
- Born: Arizona Territory, United States
- Died: unknown
- Military career
- Allegiance: United States of America
- Branch: United States Army
- Service years: c. 1872–1875
- Rank: Corporal
- Unit: U.S. Army Indian Scouts
- Conflicts: Indian Wars; Apache Wars
- Awards: Medal of Honor

Elsatsoosu (fl. 1872–1875), also called Elsatsoosh, was an Apache Indian scout in the U.S. Army who served under Lieutenant Colonel George Crook during the Apache Wars. He guided cavalry troopers against renegade Apaches in the Arizona Territory during Crook's winter campaign of 1872–73 and was one of ten scouts later who received the Medal of Honor for gallantry.

== Biography ==
Born in the Arizona Territory, Elsatsoosu (or Elsatsoosh) was one of ten Apaches hired by the U.S. Army as an Indian scout for Lieutenant Colonel George Crook's campaign against the renegades still active following the surrender of Cochise in late 1872. He specifically guided cavalry troopers in the Tonto Basin, where the Western Apache and Yavapais had been successfully conducting raids and eluding troops for several years, battling the Apache in the mountains during Crook's winter campaign of 1872–73. A total of 23 men received the Medal of Honor. Of these, all 10 Indian scouts, including Elsatsoosu, received the award on April 12, 1875, for "gallant conduct during campaigns and engagements with Apaches". The other scouts were William Alchesay, Blanquet, Chiquito, Jim, Kelsay, Kosoha, Machol, Nannasaddie and Nantaje.

== Medal of Honor citation ==
Rank and organization: Corporal, Indian Scouts. Place and date: Winter of 1872–73. Entered service at:------. Birth: Arizona. Date of issue: April 12, 1875.

Citation:

Gallant conduct during campaigns and engagements with Apaches.

== Burial ==
His date and place of death are unknown. A cenotaph in his honor is maintained at the Arizona Veterans Memorial Cemetery in Marana, Pima County, Arizona.

== See also ==
- List of Medal of Honor recipients for the Indian Wars
