= Nannasaddie =

US Army Medal of Honor recipient (fl. 1872–1875)

- Born: Arizona Territory, United States
- Military career
- Allegiance: United States of America
- Branch: United States Army
- Service years: c. 1872–1875
- Rank: Corporal
- Unit: U.S. Army Indian Scouts
- Conflicts: Indian Wars; Apache Wars
- Awards: Medal of Honor

Nannasaddie (fl. 1872–1875) was an Apache Indian scout in the U.S. Army who served under Lieutenant Colonel George Crook during the Apache Wars. He guided cavalry troopers against renegade Apaches in the Arizona Territory during Crook's winter campaign of 1872–73 and was one of ten scouts who later received the Medal of Honor for gallantry.

== Biography ==
Born in the Arizona Territory, Nannasaddie was among the ten Apaches hired by the U.S. Army as an Indian scout for Lieutenant Colonel George Crook's expedition against renegades active in Arizona following the surrender of Cochise in late 1872. He guided cavalry troopers in the Tonto Basin, where the Western Apache and Yavapais raiding parties had eluded the U.S. Army for several years, fighting the Apache in the mountains during Crook's winter campaign of 1872–73. A total of 23 men received the Medal of Honor. All of the Indian scouts, including Nannasaddie, received the award on April 12, 1875, for "gallant conduct during campaigns and engagements with Apaches". The other scouts included William Alchesay, Blanquet, Chiquito, Elsatsoosu, Jim, Kelsay, Kosoha, Machol and Nantaje.

== Medal of Honor citation ==
Rank and organization: Indian Scouts. Place and date: 1872–73. Entered service at:------. Birth: Arizona. Date of issue: 12 April 1875.

Citation:

Gallant conduct during campaigns and engagements with Apaches.

== See also ==
- List of Medal of Honor recipients for the Indian Wars
