= Nantaje =

Apache scout for the U.S. Army (19th century)

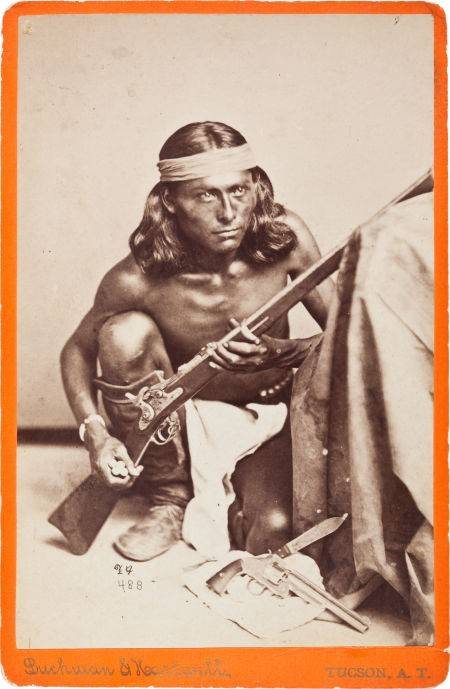
- Cabinet card of Nantaje taken after his citation.
- Born: Arizona Territory, United States
- Military career
- Allegiance: United States of America
- Branch: United States Army
- Service years: c. 1872–1875
- Rank: Private
- Unit: U.S. Army Indian Scouts
- Conflicts: Indian Wars; Apache Wars
- Awards: Medal of Honor

Nantaje (fl. 1872 – 1875), also called Nantahe, was an Apache Indian scout in the U.S. Army who served under Lieutenant Colonel George Crook during the Apache Wars. He guided cavalry troopers against renegade Apaches in the Arizona Territory during Crook's winter campaign of 1872-73 and was one of ten scouts who later received the Medal of Honor for gallantry.

== Biography ==
Born in the Arizona Territory, Nantaje (or Nantahe) was one of ten Apache Indian scout hired by the U.S. Army for Lieutenant Colonel George Crook's expedition against renegades in Arizona following the surrender of Cochise in late 1872. He guided cavalry troopers in the Tonto Basin, where the Western Apache and Yavapais raiding parties had successfully eluded U.S. troops for several years, and saw action against the Apache during Crook's winter campaign of 1872–73. In one of these engagements, Nantaje led a group of sharpshooters to the mouth of a cave to ambush a number of Yavapai hiding there.

During the battle, a Yavapai boy was caught in the crossfire. Nantaje ran from cover and carried the boy to safety. By the end of the day Nantaje and the other scouts had helped rout the Indians in the cave, seventy-six of whom were killed. The place was henceforth known as "Skull Cave."

A total of 23 men received the Medal of Honor. All 10 Indian scouts, including Nantaje, received the award on April 12, 1875, for "gallant conduct during campaigns and engagements with Apaches". The other scouts included William Alchesay, Blanquet, Chiquito, Elsatsoosu, Jim, Kelsay, Kosoha, Machol and Nannasaddie.

== Medal of Honor citation ==
Rank and organization: Indian Scouts. Place and date: 1872–73. Entered service at:------. Birth: Arizona. Date of issue: 12 April 1875.

Citation:

Gallant conduct during campaigns and engagements with Apaches.

== See also ==
- List of Medal of Honor recipients for the Indian Wars
