= Post-1887 Apache Wars period =

Campaign period

Post-1887 period
- Part of the Apache Wars
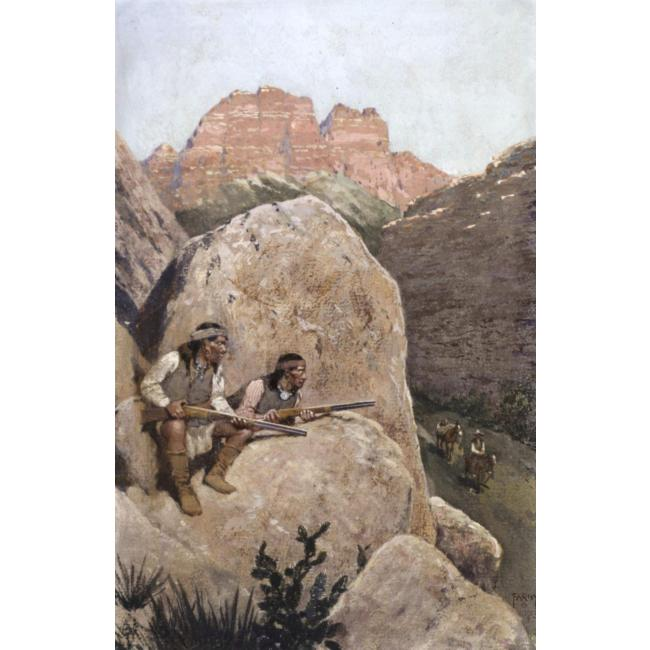
- Renegade Apaches by Henry Farny
Date	1887–1924
Location	Southwest United States, Northwestern Mexico
Result	United States/Mexican victory

Belligerents
United States; Mexico	Apache

The post-1887 Apache Wars period of the Apache Wars refers to campaigns by the United States and Mexico against the Apaches.

After the surrender of Geronimo in 1886, Apache warriors continued warfare against Americans and Mexicans. The 10th Cavalry and 4th Cavalry forces under First Lieutenant James W. Watson pursued mounted Apache warriors north of Globe, Arizona, along the Salt River. Sergeant James T. Daniels, Company L., 4th Cavalry and Sergeant William McBryar, Troop K., 10th Cavalry, are the last-known recipients of the Medal of Honor for actions during the Apache Wars. Both were cited for "extreme courage and heroism" while under attack by hostile Apaches, on March 7, 1890. Sergeant Y. B. Rowdy, Troop A, of the Indian Scouts, was also decorated with the medal on the same date.

The last Apache raid into the United States occurred as late as 1924 when a band of Apaches stole some horses from Arizonan settlers. The Apaches were caught and arrested.

The Mexican Indian Wars that involved Apache bands in Northern Mexico continued for another nine years, until the final holdouts were defeated in 1933.

== See also ==
- Kelvin Grade massacre, 1889
- Cherry Creek campaign, 1890
- Apache Campaign (1896)
