= United States Army Indian Scouts =

Native Americans serving in the US Army

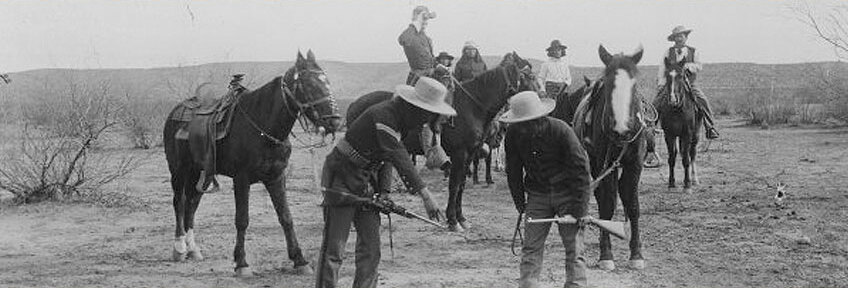
Soldiers and Indian scouts take observations before the Battle of Big Dry Wash (1882)

Native Americans have made up an integral part of American military conflicts since the Colonial period. Colonists recruited Indian allies during conflicts such as the Pequot War, the French and Indian Wars, the Revolutionary War, as well as in War of 1812. Native Americans also fought on both sides during the American Civil War, as well as military missions abroad including the most notable, the Codetalkers who served in World War II. The Scouts were active in the American West in the late 19th and early 20th centuries. Including those who accompanied General John J. Pershing in 1916 on his expedition to Mexico in pursuit of Pancho Villa. Indian Scouts were officially deactivated in 1947 when their last member retired from the Army at Fort Huachuca, Arizona. For many Indians it was an important form of interaction with European-American culture and their first major encounter with the Whites' way of thinking and doing things.

== Recruitment and enlistment ==
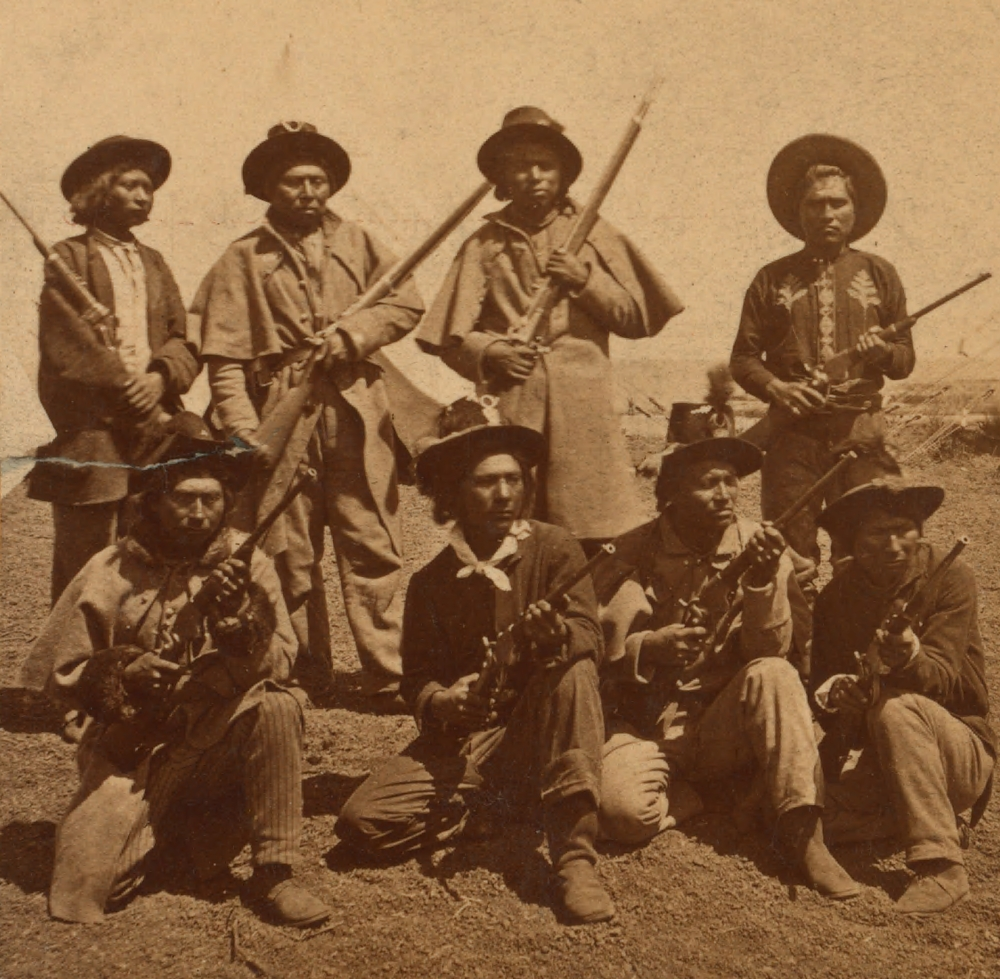
The Warm Spring Indian Scouts were a group of Native American scouts from the Warm Springs Reservation in Oregon

Recruitment of Indian scouts was first authorized on July 28, 1866 by an act of Congress.

"The President is authorized to enlist and employ in the Territories and Indian country a force of Indians not to exceed one thousand to act as scouts, who shall receive the pay and allowances of cavalry soldiers, and be discharged whenever the necessity for further employment is abated, at the discretion of the department commander."

There were different types of scouts, some enlisted as Indian Scouts for brief terms and there were others who were hired as scouts by the U.S. Army. Some individual may have served at different times as a hired scout and an enlisted scout. Prior to the act in 1866 these scouts were considered employees rather than soldiers. Enlistment records and muster rolls, from 1866 to 1912 were in many instances filed by state, some records were broken down by company or military post providing information such as when, where, and by whom the scout was enlisted; period of enlistment; place of birth; age at time of enlistment; physical description; and possibly additional remarks such as discharge information, including date and place of discharge, rank at the time, and if the scout died in service. Indian scouts who were officially enlisted in the army after 1866 were issued old pattern uniforms from surplus stock legally exempt from sale. Their uniforms were worn with less regulation, sometimes mixed with their native dress. In 1870, Captain Bourke of the 3rd Cavalry described Apache scouts in Arizona as "almost naked, their only clothing being a muslin loin-cloth, a pair of point toed moccasins and a hat of hawk feather". In 1876 a description of Crow Scouts reads that they wore, "an old black army hat with top cut out and sides bound round with feathers, fur and scarlet cloth". With the availability of army clothing some Native scouts took advantage of the availability of the clothing. In 1902 when new regulations were introduced in March the U.S. Scouts received a new more regulated uniform.

In the Indian wars following the U.S. Civil War, the Indian Scouts were a fast-moving, aggressive, and knowledgeable asset to the U.S. Army. They often proved to be immune to army notions of discipline and demeanor, but they proved expert in traversing the vast distances of the American West and providing intelligence—and often a shock force—to the soldiers who sought hostile Indians. Pawnee Scout leader Luther H. North commented, "Neither the Wild Tribes, nor the Government Indian Scouts ever adopted any of the White soldier's tactics. They thought their own much better." Another chief of scouts, Stanton G. Fisher, emphasized the importance of Indian Scouts by saying of the soldiers, "Uncle Sam's boys are too slow for this business."

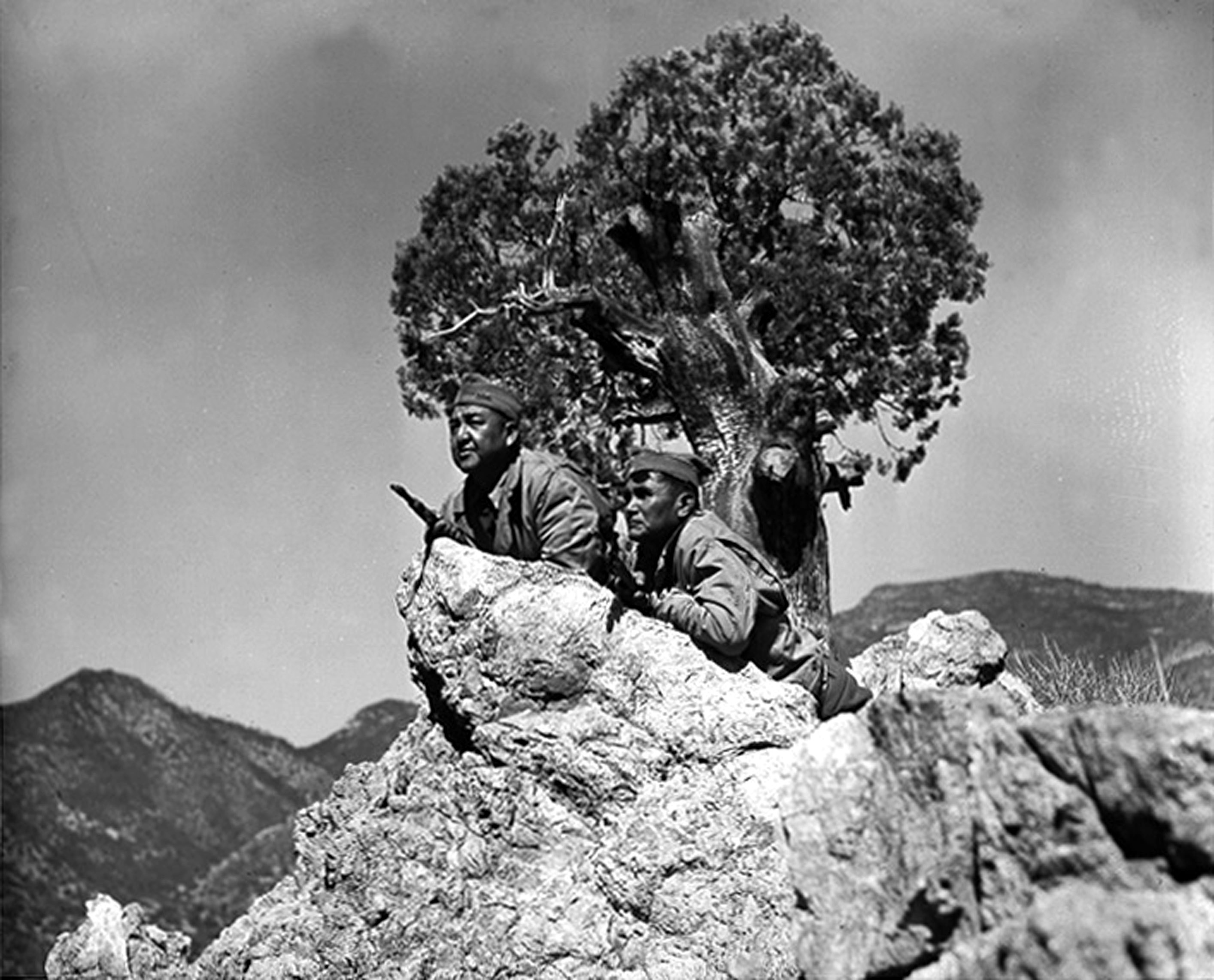
Two Indian scouts at Fort Huachuca, 1942.

In 1892 1st Lieutenant Hugh L. Scott organized Troop L of the 7th Cavalry Regiment at Fort Sill, Oklahoma. All of its enlisted men in Troop L were Indian Scouts. The troop served until 1897 when the enlistments of the Scouts expired and it was disbanded. Scott would rise to the rank of major general and served as Chief of Staff of the United States Army from 1914 to 1917.

The last detachment of Indian Scouts served at Fort Huachuca, Arizona in 1942.

== Tracking methods ==
During the Indian wars, scouts were able to detect horse tracks where other soldiers could only detect hard ground. From these tracks, scouts could estimate the number of horses in a group. From the moisture content of horse dung, scouts could estimate the age of the trail. Scouts were also able to discern whether females rode with a group based on the position of a horse's urine within its tracks - women sometimes/often rode mares while men rode stallions.

== Fears ==
There existed doubts as to whether Indian Scouts would remain faithful or whether they would betray the White soldiers and turn against them in conflict. The Cibicue Apaches were among the first regular Army Scouts. They are also the only recorded 19th-century incident in which Indian scouts turned against the U.S. Army at Cibicue Creek in Arizona Territory. These Apache scouts were asked to campaign against their own kin, resulting in a mutiny against the army soldiers. Three of the scouts were court-martialed and executed.

== Reduction of forces ==
The end of hostilities on the frontier meant a reduction in the number of the Indian scouts needed. Army General Order No. 28 issued on March 9, 1891 reduced the number of scouts to 150, down from 275 authorized in 1889, distributed among the different departments. This brought the numbers down to; Department of Arizona, 50, Departments of the Dakota, Platte and Missouri, 25 each; Department of Texas, 15, and Departments of the Columbia, 10. Pension files provide information not only on Indian Scouts but also about his family and others with whom he may have served or who knew him or his wife. Indian Scouts and their widows became eligible for pensions with the passage of an act on March 4, 1917, relating to Indian wars from 1859 to 1891.

When the Army was reorganized by the Act of March 3, 1898, the authorized number of Indian Scouts was further reduced to 75. In the Report of the Secretary of War for Fiscal Year 1941, the number of Indian Scouts on active duty with the U.S. Army as of June 30, 1941 was seven.

== Notable figures and recognition ==
Frontier Scouts included black, native and mixed blood individuals. Native involvement in military service came from different tribes and regions across the United States including Narragansett, Mohegan, Apache, Navajo and Alaska Natives (who would become involved in the 1940s).

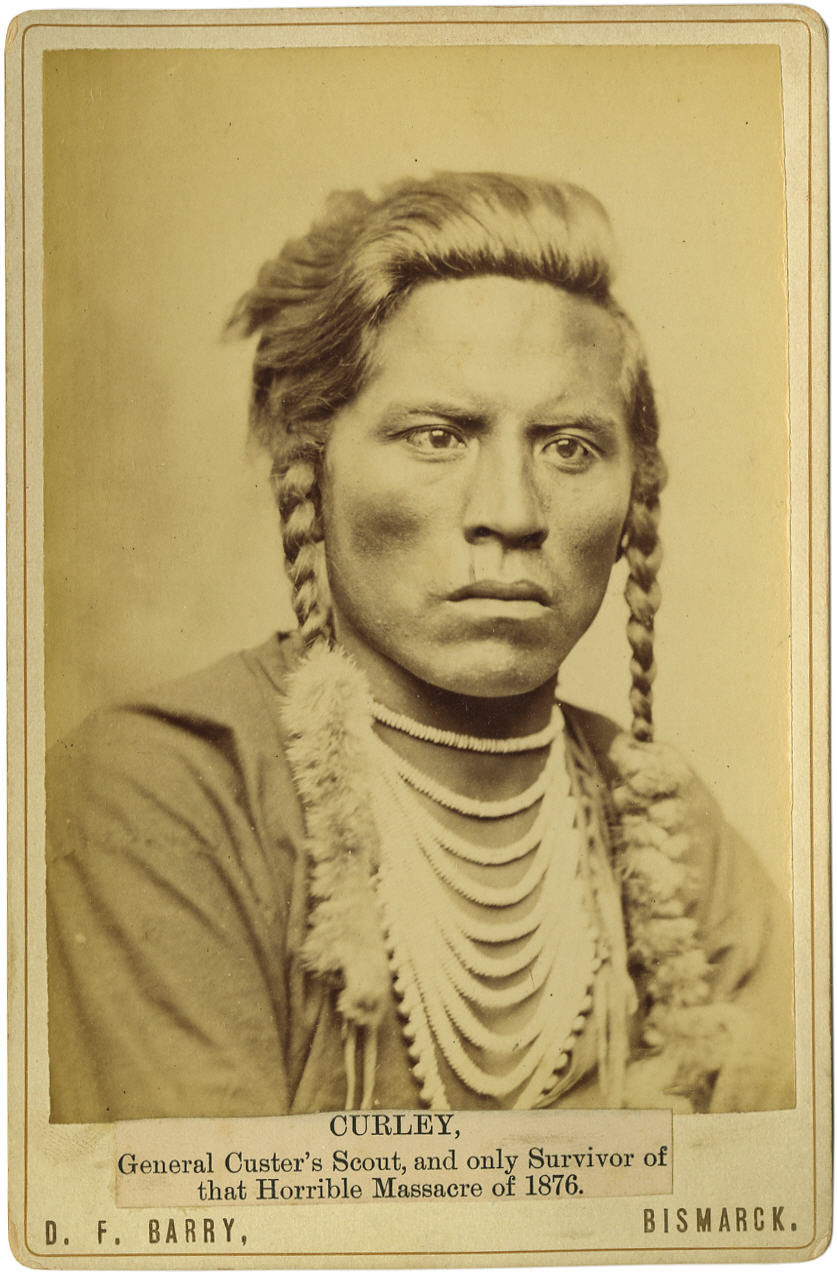
Ashishishe (c. 1856–1923), known as Curly (or Curley) and Bull Half White, was a Crow scout in the United States Army during the Sioux Wars

One of the most notable U.S. Army Indian Scouts was Curley, a member of the Crow tribe who became a scout in April 1876 under Colonel John Gibbon. He then joined Lieutenant Colonel Custer. Curley is most often identified as the lone survivor of "Custer's Last Stand". He denied witnessing the battle. The Chicago Tribune published an article claiming that Curly had made statements to them about the battle. John F. Finerty claimed that "Curley said that Custer remained alive throughout the greater part of the engagement, animating his men to determined resistance, but about an hour before the close of the fight received a mortal wound."

The official website of the Navy lists the American Indian Medal of Honor recipients, including twelve from the 19th century. In the 20th century, five American Indians have been among those soldiers to be distinguished by receiving the United States' highest military honor: This honor is given for military heroism "above and beyond the call of duty", exhibiting extraordinary bravery, and for some, making the ultimate sacrifice for their country.

The role of Native American women in the U.S. Army is being slowly filled by the efforts of such groups as The Women In Military Service For America Memorial Foundation. It is known of individuals such as Tyonajanegen, an Oneida woman, Sacajawea, a Shoshone, and various female nurses have aided the military as far back as the American Revolution. Little information is currently listed on women's roles as scouts during the 19th century.

Sergeant I-See-O (born c. 1849) was a Kiowa who served as an Indian Scout from 1889 until his death in 1927. He served alongside future Army Chief of Staff Hugh L. Scott in the final campaigns of the Indian Wars. In 1915 Scott persuaded Congress to allow I-See-O to serve on active duty for life. I-See-O, who, according to Scott, "has simply been stunned by civilization", lived in a teepee in a remote part of Fort Sill, Oklahoma during his later days. He was a guest of President Calvin Coolidge at the White House in 1925.

== Insignia ==
Special Forces branch insignia.

In 1890 the Scouts were authorized to wear the branch of service insignia of crossed arrows. In 1942 the insignia was authorized to be worn by the 1st Special Service Force. As their traditions passed into the U.S. Army Special Forces, the crossed arrows became part of their insignia being authorized as branch of service insignia in 1984.

== List ==
- Apache Scouts
- Arikara scouts
- Black Seminole Scouts
- Navajo Scouts
- Pawnee Scouts
- Crow Scouts

== Medal of Honor ==
The following 16 Indian Scouts received the Medal of Honor:

- Sergeant William Alchesay
- Blanquet
- Chiquito
- Sergeant Co-Rux-Te-Chod-Ish (Traveling Bear - mistakenly translated as "Mad Bear")
- Elsatsoosu
- Pompey Factor
- Sergeant Jim
- Kelsay
- Kosoha
- Machol
- Nannasaddie
- Nantaje
- Adam Paine
- Isaac Payne
- Yuma William "Bill" Rowdy
- Sergeant John Ward

== See also ==
- Aboriginal tracker
- Alamo Scouts
- Apache Scouts
- Arikara scouts
- Black Seminole Scouts
- Code talker
- Crow Scouts
- Curley
- Eskimo Scouts
- Indian auxiliaries
- Native Police
- Navajo Scouts
- Pawnee Scouts
- Pequot War
- Philippine Scouts
- Shadow Wolves
- South Pacific Scouts
