= Battle of the Catalina River =

Part of the 1784 Spanish conquest of Arizona

- Part of the Mexican Apache Wars; Mexican Navajo Wars
Date	March 21, 1784
Location	Catalina River, Arizona 32.437°N 110.492°W
Result	Spanish victory, successful Navajo/Apache delaying action.

Belligerents
Spain	Apache; Navajo

Commanders and leaders
(Spain) Tomás Equrrola	Chiquito

Strength
30 native scouts 12 cavalry 5 militia	~500 warriors

Casualties and losses
Unknown	14 killed
- Location in Arizona Location in United States

The Battle of the Catalina River was a military engagement fought on March 21, 1784 during the Spanish conquest of the present day Arizona. The combatants were Apache and Navajo warriors, Spanish soldiers and Tucson militia.

== Battle ==
After the native raid, known as the Fourth Battle of Tucson, on March 21, 1784, an Apache and Navajo force withdrew to the Catalina Mountains but before making it all the way there, a pursuing group Spaniards and Pimas caught up with them.

Reinforced by thirty Pima scouts from the neighboring towns of Tupson and San Xavier, the Spanish force consisted of forty-eight men, including five Tucson citizens, serving as militia, along with twelve men of the remount herd guard. The Spanish and Pima force left Tucson and after only forty-five minutes, caught up with the Navajos and Apaches at the base of the Catalina Mountains, near the Catalina River as it was called at the time.

The native army split in two, 400 out of 500 warriors continued up the mountain. The other 100 natives were directed to delay the Spaniards in order to allow the escape of the main Apache and Navajo force. Lieutenant Tomás Equrrola's was in command, his troop killed fourteen warriors and wounded many others, among them Chief Chiquito, who was the one who commanded and instigated his followers to raid Tucson. The Spaniards and Pimas suffered an unknown number of casualties themselves.

Eventually the remaining 100 natives were routed but when the Spanish cavalry tried to pursue they were unable. The fourteen dead Apaches and or Navajos were decapitated and their heads brought back to Tucson and placed along the presidio walls, as a warning, next to the heads of the three warriors killed in the raid.

== See also ==
- Capture of Tucson (1846)
- Capture of Tucson (1862)
- Siege of Tubac
- American Indian Wars
- Apache Wars
- Navajo Wars
