= Pompey Factor =

United States Army Medal of Honour recipient

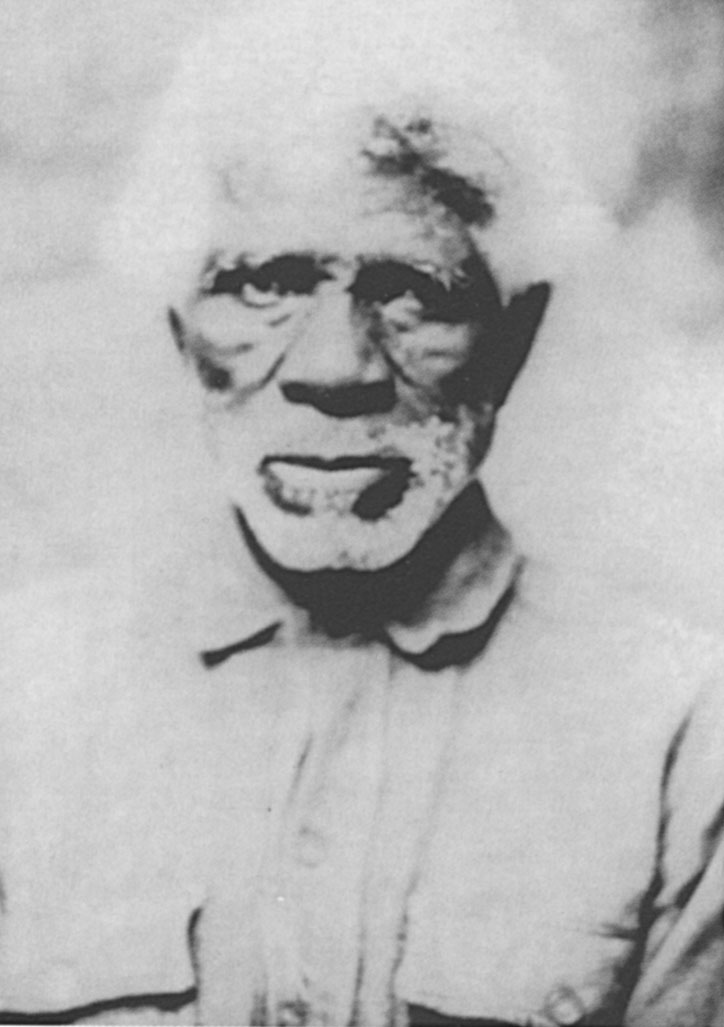
- Born: c. 1849; Arkansas
- Died: March 29, 1928 (aged 78–79); Texas
- Military career
- Allegiance: United States of America
- Branch: United States Army
- Service years: 1870 - 1877, 1879 - 1880
- Rank: Private
- Units: Black Seminole Scouts, 24th Infantry Regiment
- Conflicts: American Indian Wars
- Awards: Medal of Honor

Pompey Factor (c. 1849 – March 29, 1928) was a Black Seminole who served as a United States Army Indian Scout and received America's highest military decoration—the Medal of Honor—for his actions in the Indian Wars of the Western United States.

== Biography ==
After having lived in Mexico for the previous two decades, Factor and other Black Seminoles joined the US Army as Seminole-Negro Indian Scouts in August 1870 and served in the Red River War. On April 25, 1875, he was serving as a private by the Pecos River in Texas where, "[w]ith 3 other men, he participated in a charge against 25 hostiles while on a scouting patrol." A month later, on May 28, 1875, Factor was awarded the Medal of Honor for his actions during the engagement. Two of the other men who took part in the charge, Isaac Payne and John Ward, both Black Seminoles, also received Medals of Honor.

Following the fatal shooting of his former fellow scout and Medal of Honor recipient Adam Paine on New Years Day 1877, by another Medal of Honor recipient, Claron A. Windus, deputy sheriff of Brackettville, Texas, who was attempting to arrest Paine as a murder suspect, Factor deserted from the Army and fled back to Mexico. Later, he surrendered and rejoined the Army, eventually being discharged in November 1880.

Factor died at age 78 or 79 and was buried at the Seminole Indian Scout Cemetery in Brackettville, Texas.

== Medal of Honor citation ==
Rank and organization: Private, Indian Scouts. Place and date: At Pecos River, Tex., April 25, 1875. Entered service at:------. Birth: Arkansas. Date of issue: May 28, 1875.

Citation:

With three other men, he participated in a charge against 25 hostiles while on a scouting patrol.

== See also ==
- List of Medal of Honor recipients
- List of Medal of Honor recipients for the Indian Wars
- List of African American Medal of Honor recipients
- List of Native American Medal of Honor recipients
