= Black Seminole Scouts =

Former military units

Seminole Negro - Indian Scouts, aka, Black Seminole Scouts
- Active: 1870–1914
- Allegiance: United States of America
- Branch: United States Army
- Type: Indian scouts
- Garrison/HQ: Fort Duncan, Texas; Fort Clark, Texas
- Engagements: American Indian Wars: Texas-Indian Wars; Comanche War; Red River War; Apache Wars; Garza Revolution

Black Seminole Scouts, also known as the Seminole Negro - Indian Scouts, or Seminole Scouts, were employed by the United States Army between 1870 and 1914. The unit included both Black Seminoles and some native Seminoles. However, because most of the Seminole scouts were of African descent, they were often attached to the Buffalo Soldier regiments, to guide the troops through hostile territory. The majority of their service was in the 1870s, in which they played a significant role in ending the Texas-Indian Wars.

== Service history ==
=== Texas-Indian Wars ===
The Black and native Seminoles originally came from Florida; after escaping their masters, several hundred Black Freedmen sought refuge among the Seminoles, who granted them autonomy in exchange for periodic tribute and military service. In 1842, the Seminoles reluctantly agreed to move to a reservation in the Indian Territory. Not long after the Seminoles were removed to the Indian Territory, the Black Seminoles, as they became, went to Coahuila, Mexico, to escape enslavement. There they were welcomed by the Mexicans and later joined by native Seminoles, Black Creeks and Black Cherokees.

In 1870, the United States Army issued a message to the Black Seminoles' chief, John Horse, inviting him and his band to come back to the United States to enlist as Indian scouts and help fight hostile Native Americans; in exchange, they would be repatriated to Indian Territory. The Black Seminoles, about 200 people, accepted the agreement, believing that they would be granted land in the United States, food and provisions, as well as reimbursement for traveling costs. The treaty was sent from Fort Duncan to Fort Sam Houston, but has since been lost, and none of these promises ever were kept.

They crossed the international border on July 4 and were officially mustered into service on August 16 at Fort Duncan, near Eagle Pass, Texas. Most of the scouts were moved to Fort Clark near Brackettville in July 1872. Their first able commander was a Quaker and Civil War veteran, Lieutenant John L. Bullis; the others were too unreliable to control the unit. Having been a commander of black soldiers during the Civil War, Bullis was trusted by his men and even asked to perform marriages for the tribe.

Between May 1872 and 1881, the Seminole scouts fought in several engagements with Comanches, Kiowas, Apaches and Kickapoos, sometimes traveling into Mexico, the Indian Territory and Kansas.

During their service against hostiles, not a single scout, out of no more than fifty men, was killed or seriously injured. Usually the scouts fought with the cavalry regiments stationed at Fort Clark but occasionally they launched their own operations. Fort Clark was also the headquarters of Colonel Ranald S. Mackenzie, the leader of multiple expeditions into Mexico to punish hostile natives that crossed the border to raid in the United States. Mackenzie played a key role in ending the Indian wars in Texas. In 1873, the Secretary of War William W. Belknap and General Philip Sheridan went to Fort Clark for "secret talks" with Mackenzie. It was decided that the colonel would lead a punitive expedition across the border to fight the Lipan and that scouts would guide the way. On May 17, 1873, Colonel Mackenzie crossed the border into Coahuila Mexico with the scouts and a detachment of 4th Cavalry. They fought a successful skirmish against Kickapoo raiders at El Remolino, forced the Mexican Army to keep from intervening and then hastily returned to the fort. During the Red River War, a notable engagement occurred on September 19, 1874, when three Black Seminole scouts and two Tonkawa scouts were sent out by Mackenzie to search for enemies. During the journey the five men were ambushed by about forty Kiowas. The only option was to try and fight their way out and escape. Details of the engagement are unclear but the scout Adam Payne was awarded the Medal of Honor for risking his life to save the others. Under fire, Payne engaged the Kiowas, allowing the other four men to get away. Eventually Payne's horse was shot out from underneath him but he was able to kill one of the attackers and take his horse. Payne was decorated for his "habitual courage" and received the Medal of Honor.

While attached to the buffalo soldiers of the 24th Infantry, three scouts received the Medal of Honor in 1875. For their "bravery and trustworthiness" during a skirmish on April 25 against Comanches who had raided a stagecoach on April 5 and stolen horses. Scouts John Ward, Isaac Payne and Pompey Factor were with Lieutenant Bullis scouting to locate the Comanches along the lower Pecos River. When the camp was found the scouts dismounted and positioned themselves behind some rocks so that they would appear to be a larger force and a battle ensued. According to Bullis' report "we twice took their horses from them and killed three Indians and wounded a fourth" but the roughly thirty Comanche eventually ascertained the scouting party"s size and attempted to surround it to cut off the scouts from their horses. The scouts made it to their horses though and they were on their way back to safety when they realized that Lieutenant Bullis had been left behind. Under heavy fire, the scouts returned to rescue their commander.

In May 1876 Chief John Horse was badly wounded and the scout Titus Payne was killed after a shooting incident in Eagle Pass. There was apparently no effort to catch the shooters because the former outlaw and sheriff John King Fisher was suspected of being responsible. Fisher was a horse thief and cattle rustler in his early life and well known for his hatred of the scouts. By 1876 he was a sheriff and had almost indisputable control over Kinney County. Because of this power Fisher was untouchable. The shooting created unrest among the Black Seminoles and over the course of the next few months there were outbreaks of brawling and rioting. The local American settlers attempted to have the scouts disbanded but others argued that the army should enlist all of the male Black Seminoles as scouts in order to protect them from outlaws and hostile natives.

In late August, John Ward's brother, Scott, was accused of stealing five horses and then in September Isaac Payne and Dallas Griner were accused of stealing a horse from Deputy Sheriff Claron Windus. The two evaded arrest and fled to Nacimiento, Mexico, but they made the mistake of returning to Brackettville in December to celebrate the coming of the new year. Somehow the sheriff of Brackettville, Lorenzo C. Crowell, learned of the celebration and devised a plan to capture the fugitives. So on the night of December 31, Sheriff Crowell, Deputy Sheriff Windus and a teamster named Jonathan May went to the Seminole's reservation just outside town and stealthily positioned themselves around the fugitive's camp. One later account of the incident says that a company of soldiers was to assist in the arrest but if this was true they played no active role in the event. At midnight Sheriff Crowell made his appearance, some accounts say the Black Seminoles were dancing at a church when Crowell appeared and others say that the celebrating took place on the property of the scout Friday Bowleg. According to one account, Adam Payne was dancing when he heard Crowell call his name. As he turned, Claron Windus fired upon him with a shotgun and "shot him so close it set him on fire." Other accounts say that there was a struggle while Crowell was trying to handcuff the men and that Adam and the scout Frank Enoch were shot while trying to escape. The scout Bobby Kibbett attacked Windus at that point and while Windus and Crowell were fighting with him Isaac Payne and Dallas Griner got away to Mexico. Adam's body was given to his family for burial and Enoch died during surgery in Brackettville. Bobby Kibbett was later tried and acquitted for attempting to murder Deputy Sheriff Windus and the charges against Isaac Payne and Dallas Griner were dropped. Payne stayed in Mexico for a few weeks before returning to Fort Clark to re-enlist.

In 1878, Colonel Ranald S. Mackenzie was recalled to the fort in order to lead an expedition against the Kickapoo. After this campaign the Texas-Indian Wars were mostly over, all of the hostile natives were either dead or living in the reservation system. However, on February 23, 1893, the scouts fought in one final skirmish against Mexican bandits at Las Muias Ranch, thirty miles north of Fort Ringgold in Starr County.

=== Disbandment and legacy ===
The Black Seminole Scouts were disbanded twenty-one years later in 1914 and most were forced to leave the Fort Clark reservation with their families. Just twenty-seven Black Seminoles were allowed to remain at the fort but only until the elders of the group had departed. The official report of the disbandment reads as follows:

"In compliance with orders contained in the 3rd Indorsement Headquarters Southern Department, May 7th, 1914, and the 5th Indorsement War Department, June 29th, 1914, on communications 2128018-A.A.G.O., April 16, 1914 - Subject Seminole Negro Indian Scouts. The Seminole Negro Indian Scouts will be disbanded and cease to exist as an organization after September 30, 1914. They will be discharged from Service of the United States in three detachments as follows: Privates, Curly Jefferson, Fay July, Sam Washington, and Charles J. July on July 31st, 1914. One third in the Scout camp on the reservation including the families of the scouts discharged July 31st, 1914 will move from the Fort Clark Military between August 1st and August 15th, 1914 with all of their stock and belongings. The following named scouts will be discharged from the Service of United States, September 30th, 1914, - 1st Sgt. John Shields, Privates: Antonio Sanchez, Isaac Wilson and William Wilson. The remainder of the people including the Scouts discharged September 30th, 1914, and their families with the exception of those named in the following paragraph will move from Fort Clark Military Reservation between October 1st and October 15th, 1914 with all of their effects. The following named members of the Scout Camp will be permitted to remain and live on the Fort Clark Military Reservation until the older people pass away in the course of nature, or until such time as the War Department may see fit to order their removal. After the removal of the people from the Scout Camp, the buildings not in use by those permitted to stay, will be demolished."

Many of the scouts' remains rest at the Seminole Indian Scouts Cemetery in Kinney County, Texas, including Medal of Honor recipients, John Ward, Pompey Factor, Adam Paine and Isaac Payne; along with members of their families. Descendants of the Black Seminole Scouts still live in southern Texas (Brackettville, Texas, Del Rio, Texas) and northern Mexico.

=== Enlistment length ===
The duration of an enlistment agreement was set at six-months until the 20th century. This reflected the scouts' disinterest in long-term commitments and the Army's opinion that the need for scouts would not last long. Some scouts would serve more than once.

== Family legacies and structure ==
Within the scout community, there were certain surnames that were well known. Of the 152 scouts that served between 1870 and 1914, there were seventeen "Wilson"s, eleven "Payne"s, eight "July"s, seven "Factor"s, seven "Bowleg"s, six "Washington"s, six "Daniels"s, and six "Bruner"s. Many of these families were also intermarried.

== See also ==
- Black Seminoles
- Apache Scouts
- Navajo Scouts
- Pawnee Scouts
- Crow Scouts
- Seminole Scouts
- Buffalo Soldiers
- Arikara scouts
