= Isaac Payne =

United States Army Medal of Honor recipient (c. 1854–1904)

- Born: c. 1854; Musquiz, Coahuila, Mexico
- Died: January 12, 1904; Mexico
- Burial place: Seminole Indian Scout Cemetery Brackettville, Texas; Seminole Negro Indian Scout Cemetery
- Spouse: Julia Payne
- Children: Charles Payne, Robert Payne, Ellen Payne
- Military career
- Allegiance: United States of America
- Branch: United States Army
- Service years: 1871 - 1876, 1877 - 1901
- Rank: Trumpeter
- Units: Black Seminole Scouts, 24th Infantry Regiment
- Conflicts: American Indian Wars
- Awards: Medal of Honor

Isaac Payne, or Isaac Paine, (c. 1854–1904) was a Black Seminole who served as a United States Army Indian Scout and received America's highest military decoration—the Medal of Honor—for his actions in the Indian Wars of the western United States.

== Biography ==
Isaac Payne was born in Mexico to parents Caesar and Abbie. He was a member of the Black Seminoles who were historically in Florida and immigrated to Mexico. Payne and other Black Seminoles enlisted in the army October 7, 1871 and became known as one of the Seminole-Negro Indian Scouts. They enlisted because the U.S. Army promised "land, rations, and pay in exchange for service as scouts." Payne married Julia Shields on April 29, 1974 and later had children (Charles 1876, Robert 1877, Ellen 1880).

On April 26, 1875, he was serving as a trumpeter by the Pecos River in Texas where, "[w]ith 3 other men, he participated in a charge against 25 hostiles while on a scouting patrol."

They encountered 25 Commanche while at a section of Pecos River called Eagle's Nest crossing. Lieutenant John Lapham Bullis led the charge along with Payne and others. They were pushed back by the Commanche, who were yielding Winchester rifles, after around 45 minutes of fighting.

While escaping, Lieutenant Bullis struggled to get on his horse and Payne and others helped him get to safety by covering fire. They escaped and rode back to Fort Clark, Texas.

A month later, on May 28, 1875, Payne was awarded the Medal of Honor for his actions during the engagement. Two of the other men who took part in the charge, Pompey Factor and John Ward, both Black Seminoles, also received Medals of Honor.

Payne retired on January 21, 1901, at Fort Ringgold, Texas. He then moved back to Mexico, where he lived until his death at age 49 or 50. He was buried at the Seminole Indian Scout Cemetery in Brackettville, Texas.

== Medal of Honor citation ==
Rank and organization: Trumpeter, Indian Scouts. Place and date: At Pecos River, Tex., April 25, 1875. Entered service at: ------. Birth: Mexico. Date of issue: May 28, 1875.

Citation:

With 3 other men, he participated in a charge against 25 hostiles while on a scouting patrol.

== See also ==
- Adam Paine
- List of Medal of Honor recipients
- List of Medal of Honor recipients for the Indian Wars
- List of African American Medal of Honor recipients
- List of Native American Medal of Honor recipients
