= John Ward (American soldier) =

American soldier (1848-1911)

- Born: 1847 or 1848; Arkansas
- Died: March 24, 1911; Texas
- Burial place: Seminole Indian Scout Cemetery Brackettville, Texas
- Military career
- Allegiance: United States of America
- Branch: United States Army
- Service years: 1870 - 1894
- Rank: Sergeant
- Units: Black Seminole Scouts, 24th Infantry Regiment
- Conflicts: American Indian Wars
- Awards: Medal of Honor

John Ward (1847 or 1848 – March 24, 1911) was a Black Seminole who served as a United States Army Indian Scout and received America's highest military decoration—the Medal of Honor—for his actions in the Indian Wars of the western United States.

== Biography ==
After having lived in Mexico for the past two decades, Ward enlisted in the US Army at Fort Duncan, Texas in August 1870, and joined other Black Seminoles known as the "Seminole Negro Indian Scouts". On April 25, 1875, he was serving as a Sergeant in the Indian Scouts attached to the 24th Infantry Regiment by the Pecos River in Texas where, "[w]ith 3 other men, he participated in a charge against 25 hostiles while on a scouting patrol." A month later, on May 28, 1875, Ward was issued the Medal of Honor for his actions during the engagement. Two of the other men who took part in the charge, Pompey Factor and Isaac Payne, both Black Seminoles, also received Medals of Honor.

Ward was discharged from the army in October 1894, and worked as a farmer for the rest of his life. He died at age 62 or 63 and was buried at the Seminole Indian Scout Cemetery in Brackettville, Texas.

== Medal of Honor citation ==
Rank and organization: Sergeant, 24th U.S. Infantry Indian Scouts Place and date: At Pecos River, Tex., April 25, 1875. Entered service at. Fort Duncan, Tex. Birth: Arkansas. Date of issue: May 28, 1875.

Citation.

With 3 other men, he participated in a charge against 25 hostiles while on a scouting patrol.

== See also ==
- List of Medal of Honor recipients
- List of Medal of Honor recipients for the Indian Wars
- List of African American Medal of Honor recipients
- List of Native American Medal of Honor recipients
