= Navajo Scouts =

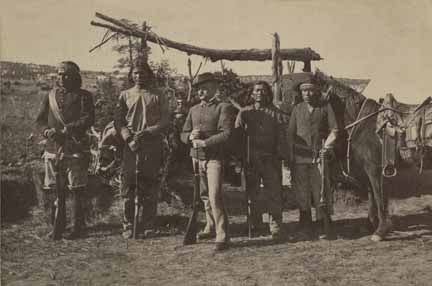
- Navajo scouts and a cavalryman at Fort Wingate, c.1890.
- Active: 1873 - 1895
- Country: United States of America
- Branch: United States Army
- Type: Indian scouts
- Engagements: Chiricahua Wars Navajo Wars; Victorio's War Geronimo's War

Commanders
- Notable commanders: George Crook; Nelson A. Miles

The Navajo Scouts were part of the United States Army Indian Scouts between 1873 and 1895. Generally, the scouts were signed up at Fort Wingate for six month enlistments. In the period 1873 to 1885, there were usually ten to twenty-five scouts attached to units. United States Army records indicated that in the Geronimo Campaign of 1886, there were about 150 Navajo scouts, divided into three companies, who were part of the 5,000 man force General Nelson A. Miles put in the field. In 1891 they were enlisted for three years. The Navajos employed as scouts were merged into regular units of the army in 1895. At least one person served almost continuously for over twenty-five years.

== Service history ==
=== Enlistments ===
Between 300 and 400 Navajos served enlistments as Indian Scouts. Most of them came from the south eastern part of the reservation and the checkerboard area. Over 125 Navajo Scouts or their spouses received pensions between the 1920s and the 1940s. After the Long Walk of the Navajo, army records indicate that Major William Redwood Price of the 8th Cavalry gave permission for fifteen Navajo to join him on a trip from Fort Wingate to Fort Apache in April 1871 but they were not "scouts". In January 1873 authorization was given "to enlist and discharge 50 Indian Scouts" in the New Mexico Territory. Major Price employed at least twenty-five Navajos in that first enlistment at Fort Wingate and they were very busy until their discharge in August 1873.

Most of the scouts came from the south eastern part of the reservation and the checkerboard area. Some men repeated their enlistments. Navajos reported that Mariano (Hastiin Łitsotsʼósí) told the Navajos if they did not want to be Scouts they would have to move out of this non-reservation country; so they agreed to become scouts.

Lieutenant Colonel P. T. Swaine reported on 21 November 1876 to the District of New Mexico that he had an " ... interview with the Chief Mariano through whose influence the last Scouts were (obtained)." On 1 June 1877 Lieutenant Henry Wright, 9th Cavalry, reports that he "enlisted 21 Navajo Indians to serve as Scouts selecting them from about 100 who presented themselves for enlistment, they are young and able men and well mounted." The army continued to employ Navajos as scouts through 1895.

=== Indian Wars ===
The scouts out of Fort Wingate were engaged in fighting Victorio's Apache braves from 1876 to 1880. In 1877 they participated in a battle at the Florida Mountains, of New Mexico and again in 1879 at Las Animas Creek. Lieutenant Henry Wright and Scout Jose Chavez were both commended for bravery in an 1877 action and the latter was still in the army in 1891 at Fort Wingate. The Navajo scouts were used by General George Crook in finding Juh, Nana and Geronimo between 1881 and 1886. General Nelson A. Miles put 150 Navajos in the field as part of his 5,000 troop deployment against Geronimo in 1886.

Navajo scouts accompanied the United States Army when it investigated many civilian-Navajo confrontations. For example, between June 14 and September 28, 1883 there were five different Navajo reservation related activities. Lieutenant Parker, with ten enlisted men and two scouts, went up to the San Juan River to separate Navajos and citizens who encroached on Navajo land. Lieutenant Guy, with seventeen enlisted men and two scouts, and Captain Smith, with 56 enlisted men and five scouts helped the local Indian agent deal with unhappy Navajo chiefs. This involved Manuelito, Torlino, Grando Muncho and fifty armed Navajos who were upset by raids of citizens and other tribes on their people and livestock. In another action: Lieutenant Lockett, with forty-two enlisted men, were joined by Lieutenant Holomon at Navajo Springs. Evidently a citizen named Houck and or Owens had murdered a Navajo chief's son and 100 armed Navajos were looking for them. It is evident from these four months of military reports from the field that the officers tended to trust the Navajo version of events.

Navajo scouts collaborated with the army in 1891 when over sixty armed Hopi were prepared to fight to prevent their children being sent away to boarding school. There was a reference in an 1891 military report, that the reporting officer knew Navajos since 1853 and commanded fifty Navajos in Benjamin Bonneville 1857 expedition against the Apaches, and had complete confidence in their friendship.

"After coming back from Fort Sumner to Fort Wingate some of our people became scouts for the military police or the Army. The Chishi Dine'e (Chiricahua Apaches) got in trouble with the Army, and the Navajo scouts fought with the Army. The Navajos helped in that way. Many of our people have told about this helping the Army, and some passed away still saying it."

— Howard W. Gorman, Navajo Stories of the Long Walk Period page 42.

In the late 1920s scouts became eligible for pensions. Many men were enlisted under nicknames and had lost their discharge papers. These men gave depositions about their service and vouched for others to Crown Point Indian Agent S. F. Stacker and Pension Examiner C. R. Franks in the late 1920s to early 1940s.

== See also ==
- Apache Scouts
- Arikara scouts
- Black Seminole Scouts
- Crow Scouts
- Eskimo Scouts
- Pawnee Scouts
