= Fourth Battle of Tucson =

Part of the Mexican Apache and Mexican Navajo Wars

Coordinates: 32.3524°N 110.9435°W

- Part of the Mexican Apache Wars, Mexican Navajo Wars
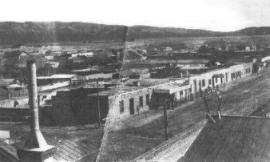
- Tucson's Stone Avenue in 1885.
Date	March 21, 1784
Location	Tucson, New Spain, Sonora; Modern Day: Tucson, Arizona
Result	Apache/Navajo victory, native American raid on livestock pen completed.

Belligerents
Spain	Apache; Navajo

Commanders and leaders
(Spain) Juan Carrillo	Chiquito

Strength
~20 cavalry 1 fort	~500 warriors

Casualties and losses
5 killed 1 wounded	3 killed

The Fourth Battle of Tucson was a raid during the lengthy wars between Spanish colonists in Arizona and its region and Apache Indians. At break of day, on March 21, 1784, a force of no more than 500 Apaches and Navajos attacked Spanish cavalry guards protecting a herd of livestock at the Presidio San Augustin del Tucson in southern Arizona.

== Battle ==
The Spanish sentries were under the command of Ensign Don Juan Carrillo when hundreds of mounted Navajo and Apache warriors attacked their position which guarded a livestock pen. The Apaches and Navajos were attempting to steal some of the cavalry garrison's horses but they had soldiers to deal with.

The herd was halted in the corral, which was defended efficiently by Ensign Carillo's squad. However, the natives succeeded, after a long time, in stampeding and carrying off the herd, leaving five soldiers dead and one wounded while sustaining three of their own dead and an unknown number wounded. Thirteen horses were captured from the presidio.

Immediately afterwards two additional soldiers arrived to give notice of what had happened. Without loss of time, a number of troops mounted themselves and followed the natives' trail of retreat.

== Aftermath ==
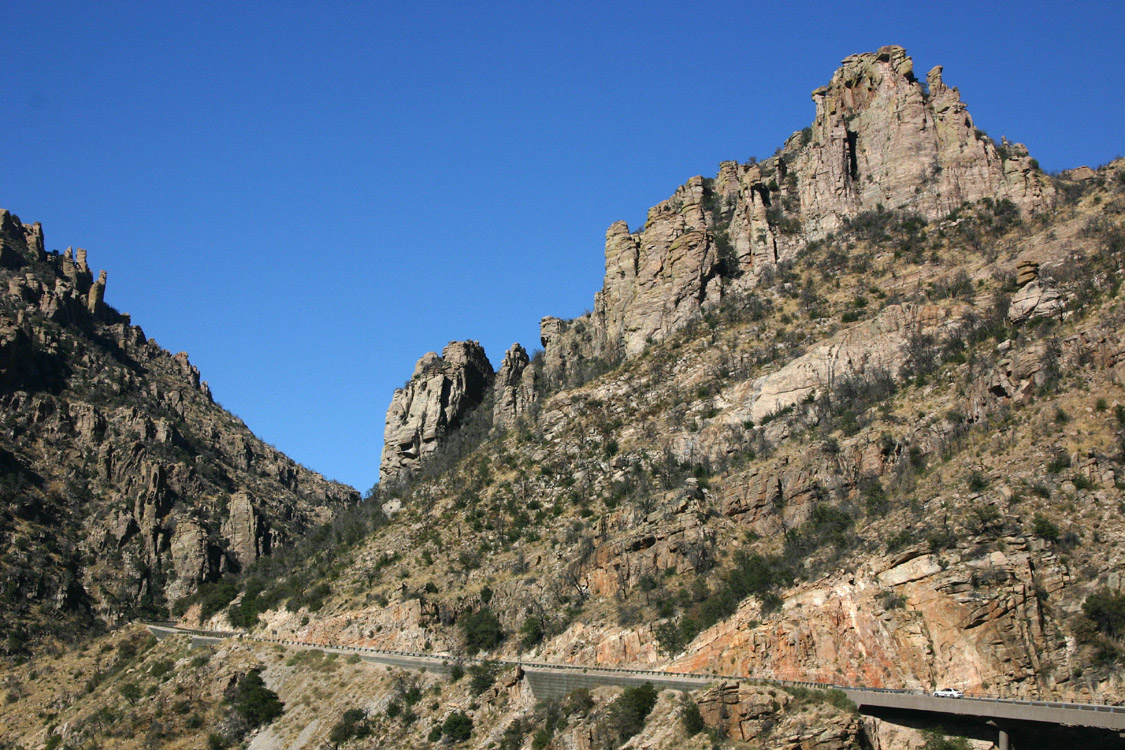
The Catalina Mountains.

Under the orders of Lieutenant Tomás Equrrola, reinforced with thirty Pima scouts from the neighboring towns of Tupson and San Xavier. This force consisted of forty-nine men, including the Pima scouts and five citizens. With the rest of the remount herd guard which consisted of twelve men. The Spanish and Pima force left Tucson and after only forty-five minutes, caught up with the Navajos and Apaches at the base of the Catalina Mountains, next to the Catalina River. Another battle began and Lieutenant Equrrola's men killed fourteen warriors, among them the native commander, Chief Chiquito.

== See also ==
- List of battles won by Indigenous peoples of the Americas
- History of Tucson, Arizona
- Siege of Tubac
- Apache Wars
- Navajo Wars
- American Indian Wars
