= Adam Paine =

United States Army Indian Scout

- Born: 1843; Alachua, Florida
- Died: January 1, 1877 (aged 33–34); Brackettville, Texas
- Burial place: Seminole Indian Scout Cemetery in Brackettville, Texas
- Military career
- Allegiance: United States of America
- Branch: United States Army
- Service years: 1873–1875
- Rank: Private
- Units: Black Seminole Scouts, 24th Infantry Regiment
- Conflicts: American Indian Wars
- Awards: Medal of Honor

Adam Paine, or Adam Payne (1843 – January 1, 1877), was a Black Seminole who served as a United States Army Indian Scout and received America's highest military decoration—the Medal of Honor—for his actions in the Indian Wars of the western United States.

== Biography ==
Payne enlisted in the Army at Fort Duncan, Texas in November 1873, and joined other Black Seminoles known as the "Seminole-Negro Indian Scouts".

=== Medal of Honor actions ===
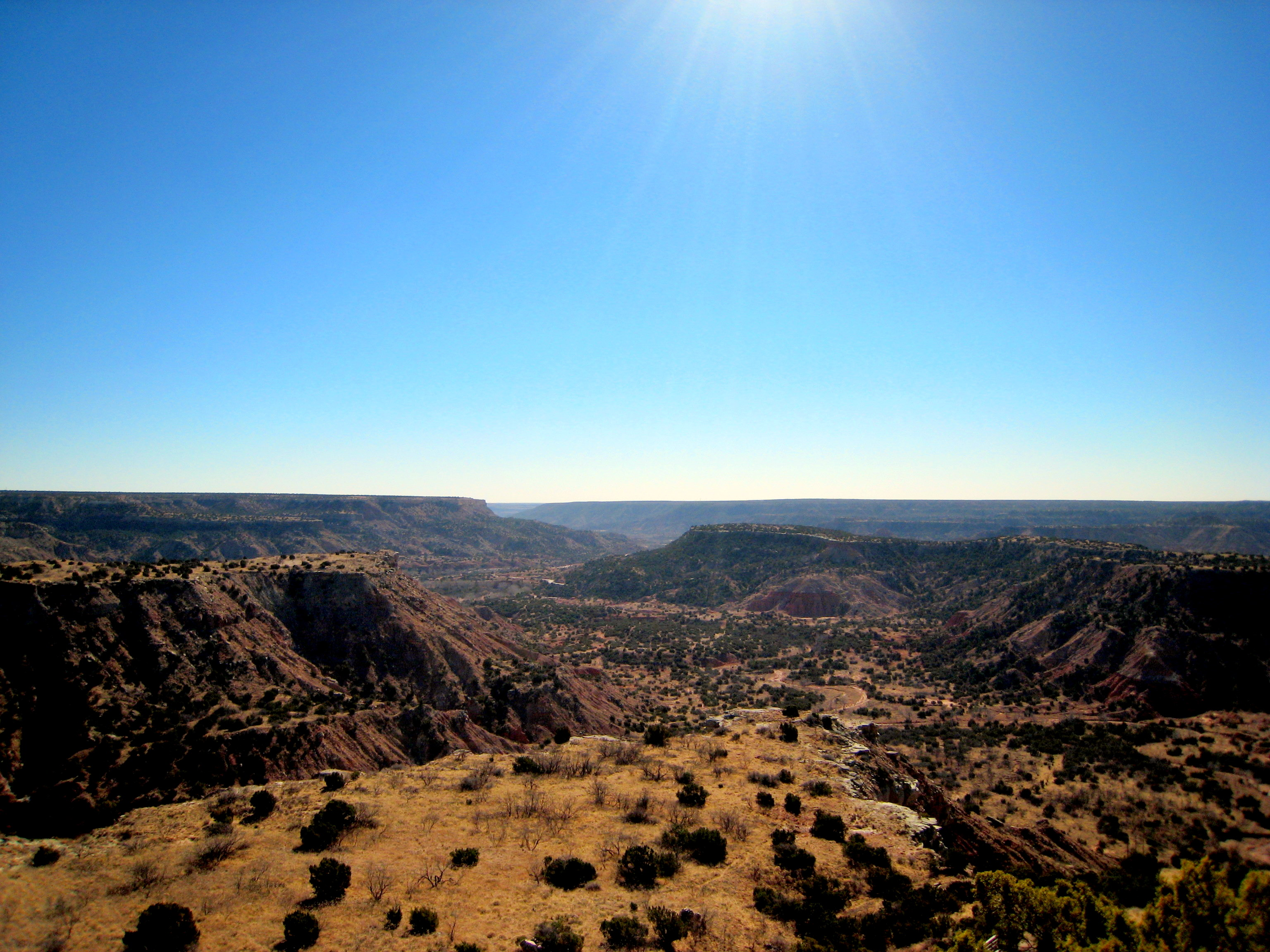
Palo Duro Canyon

Col. R. S. Mackenzie's main group from the 4th U.S. Cavalry was moving towards the Texas-New Mexico border in the Staked Plains region on September 4, 1874. A day's march ahead of the group, private Payne and three other scouts were ambushed by twenty-five Comanches. The horse leading the Comanche's charge was knocked down by Payne's swinging rifle and the scouts began to fight the enemy natives. At one point, Payne fought six Comanches at once. All four scouts broke free and returned to camp. Mackenzie placed the 4th Cavalry on heightened alert.

From September 26, to September 27, 1874, near Palo Duro Canyon, a tributary of the Red River, Payne participated in the Battle of Palo Duro Canyon. Payne "[r]endered invaluable service to Col. R. S. Mackenzie, 4th U.S. Cavalry, during this engagement." The scouts had tracked the Comanches to their camp in the Palo Duro Canyon. The 4th cavalry took the Comanches by surprise and captured or destroyed 1,400 horses and other camp equipment and supplies just prior to the onset of winter. Mackenzie recommended seven white soldiers of the 4th cavalry and Payne for the Medal of Honor. A year later, on October 13, 1875, Private Payne was awarded the Medal of Honor for his actions at Palo Duro Canyon.

=== Death ===
Paine was shot to death on New Year's Day 1877 by a fellow Medal of Honor recipient, Claron A. Windus, deputy sheriff of Brackettville, Texas, who shot Payne instead of attempting to arrest him as a murder suspect. Paine died at age 33 or 34 and was buried at the Seminole Indian Scout Cemetery in Brackettville, Texas.

== Medal of Honor citation ==
Rank and organization: Private, Indian Scouts. Place and date: Canyon Blanco tributary of the Red River, Tex., 26-September 27, 1874. Entered service at: Fort Duncan, Texas. Birth: Florida. Date of issue: October 13, 1875.

Citation:

Rendered invaluable service to Col. R. S. Mackenzie, 4th U.S. Cavalry, during this engagement.

== See also ==
- Isaac Payne
- List of Medal of Honor recipients for the Indian Wars
- List of African American Medal of Honor recipients
- List of Native American Medal of Honor recipients
