= North Fork, Arizona =

- CDP
- Location within the state of Arizona North Fork (the United States)
- Coordinates: 33°59′47″N 109°57′33″W
- Country: United States
- State: Arizona
- County: Navajo

Area
  - Total: 61.62 sq mi (159.60 km^{2})
  - Land: 61.61 sq mi (159.57 km^{2})
  - Water: 0.012 sq mi (0.03 km^{2})
- Elevation: 6,769 ft (2,063 m)

Population (2020)
  - Total: 1,467
  - Density: 23.8/sq mi (9.19/km^{2})
- Time zone: UTC-7 (MST)
- Area code: 928
- FIPS code: 04-50000
- GNIS feature ID: 2582832

North Fork is a census-designated place (CDP) in Navajo County, Arizona, United States, on the Fort Apache Indian Reservation. The population was 1,417 at the 2010 census.

== Geography ==
The CDP has a total area of 61.62 square miles (159.6 km^{2}), 61.61 square miles (159.6 km^{2}) land and 0.01 square miles (0.026 km^{2}) water.

== Demographics ==
Historical population
Census	Pop.	Note	%±
2020	1,467		—
U.S. Decennial Census

=== 2020 census ===
As of the 2020 census, North Fork had a population of 1,467. The median age was 32.0 years. 30.2% of residents were under the age of 18 and 9.3% of residents were 65 years of age or older. For every 100 females there were 87.6 males, and for every 100 females age 18 and over there were 91.0 males age 18 and over.

0.0% of residents lived in urban areas, while 100.0% lived in rural areas.

There were 392 households in North Fork, of which 48.2% had children under the age of 18 living in them. Of all households, 38.3% were married-couple households, 24.7% were households with a male householder and no spouse or partner present, and 27.0% were households with a female householder and no spouse or partner present. About 16.3% of all households were made up of individuals and 2.9% had someone living alone who was 65 years of age or older.

There were 422 housing units, of which 7.1% were vacant. The homeowner vacancy rate was 0.0% and the rental vacancy rate was 2.2%.

Racial composition as of the 2020 census
Race	Number	Percent
White	58	4.0%
Black or African American	0	0.0%
American Indian and Alaska Native	1,372	93.5%
Asian	1	0.1%
Native Hawaiian and Other Pacific Islander	0	0.0%
Some other race	4	0.3%
Two or more races	32	2.2%
Hispanic or Latino (of any race)	10	0.7%

=== 2010 census ===
As of the 2010 census, there were 1,417 people living in the CDP: 712 male and 705 female. 548 were 19 years old or younger, 289 were ages 20–34, 280 were between the ages of 35 and 49, 226 were between 50 and 64, and the remaining 74 were aged 65 and above. The median age was 27.2 years.

The racial makeup of the CDP was 93.6% American Indian, 5.3% White, 0.4% Asian, 0.1% Black or African American, 0.1% Other, and 0.6% two or more races. 2.1% of the population were Hispanic or Latino of any race.

There were 364 households in the CDP, 310 family households (85.2%) and 54 non-family households (14.8%), with an average household size of 3.89. Of the family households, 179 were married couples living together, while there were 34 single fathers and 97 single mothers; the non-family households included 45 adults living alone: 17 male and 28 female.

The CDP contained 396 housing units, of which 364 were occupied and 32 were vacant.
