= Cherry Creek campaign =

Part of the Apache Wars (1890)

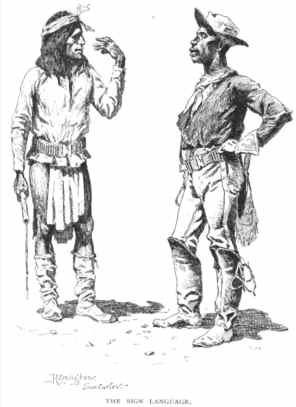
- The Sign Language by Frederic Remington shows an Apache scout and a Buffalo soldier during the Apache campaign in 1889.
- Date: March 2–7, 1890
- Location: near Globe, Arizona
- Outcome: Apaches defeated 2 killed 1 wounded 3 captured

The Cherry Creek campaign occurred in March 1890 and was one of the final conflicts between hostile Apaches and the United States Army. It began after a small group of Apaches killed a freight wagon operator, near the San Carlos Reservation, and was part of the larger Apache campaign, beginning in 1889, to round up Apaches who had left the reservations. The American army fought a skirmish with the Apaches near Globe, Arizona, at the mouth of Cherry Creek, which resulted in the deaths of two hostiles and the capture of the remaining three. Two men received the Medal of Honor for their service during the campaign.

== Background ==
Following Geronimo's final surrender in September 1886, the majority of the Apache people were sent to either Florida or Alabama as prisoners of war. Only a few companies of Apache Scouts and some small bands of hostiles remained in the southwest. One of the Apaches was the famous Indian scout known as the Apache Kid. After leaving the army in 1887, the Apache Kid was arrested near Globe, Arizona in 1889 and sentenced to several years in the Yuma Territorial Prison for the attempted murder of Albert Sieber, the chief of the Apache scouts. However, during the transfer to Yuma, the Apache Kid and a handful of his followers escaped police custody and killed two people in what has been called the Kelvin Grade Massacre. In response, the United States Army launched an operation to catch the Apache Kid and the other Apaches who were out raiding across southern Arizona, New Mexico and northern Mexico. The Kid and his gang were not the only Apaches operating off the reservation. There were several other small bands causing mischief, most notably that of Massai. Another former Apache scout, Massai is suspected of being responsible for a number of deaths in Arizona that were often attributed to the Apache Kid. But even after Massai there were others. On March 2, 1890, a group of five "drunken" Apaches killed a wagon driver named Herbert and stole two large horses, about ten miles west of Fort Thomas and the San Carlos reservation. At the time, Fort Thomas was home to Troop K of the 10th Cavalry Buffalo Soldiers, under the command of Lieutenant Powhatan Clarke, a Medal of Honor recipient who fought in Geronimo's War.

== Campaign ==
As soon as the army learned of the ambush, Lieutenant Clarke was ordered by the Department of Arizona's commander, Major General Benjamin Grierson, to take ten men "into the field" on an expedition where "every possible effort [was] made to capture or destroy the murderers." At the site of the ambush, the cavalrymen joined Lieutenant James Watson, 10th Cavalry, a small force of 4th Cavalry, and some Apache scouts. From there the scouts discovered hoofprints and a trail leading to the northwest towards the Salt River. According to General Grierson, they "persistently followed [the trail] for several days and nights over the rough, broken mountains and plains of Arizona." Eventually the cavalrymen and the Apache scouts were running low on rations so they were supplied with a cow, some coffee and some salt by a generous rancher. Some time after that, Sergeant Alexander Cheatham, I Troop, 10th Cavalry, led reinforcements, a wagon and several mules, packed with food, to the expedition from San Carlos after a nighttime march of forty-five miles. A veteran of the American Civil War, and over twenty years on the frontier, Sergeant Cheatham was able to track Lieutenants Clarke and Watson's men over rugged desert and mountain terrain in the dark. The expedition finally caught up with the Apaches in a canyon of the Salt River on March 7, approximately 200 miles from Fort Thomas and about thirty miles northeast of Globe. After entering the canyon, the terrain became very rough so the hostiles killed their horses and continued fleeing on foot. For the same reason the Apache scouts were ordered to dismount and go ahead of the cavalry to try and draw the hostiles into battle.

The pursuit through the canyon was so dangerous that at some points the scouts had to lie down and crawl through the narrow passages to trace the hostile Apaches' footprints. The cavalrymen waited down at the river to water the horses but, at about 12:00 pm, the scouts made contact with the fugitives, near the mouth of Cherry Creek. Lieutenants Clarke and Watson heard the firing from the river and immediately they proceeded towards the sound. Clarke recalled that he felt "a calm chill looking for a live Indian with a gun down in one of these great canyons." Not long after that, the cavalrymen were under fire and they assisted the scouts in trapping the hostiles within a "three-sided tangle of boulders." The Apache fugitives put up a "hard fight" but were eventually forced to retreat into a "shallow cave" as the expedition surrounded and moved in on their position. In the cave the hostiles were safe from direct fire so "one of the sergeants, an excellent shot," began "firing against a rock almost in front of their cave, thereby splatter[ing] lead and splintered rock in their faces." When the soldiers and the scouts closed to within fifty yards of the cave's entrance, they prepared to make a charge but the Apaches decided to surrender, having lost three killed or wounded out of five men.

== Aftermath ==
Four men from the 10th Cavalry, 4th Cavalry, and the Apache scouts received either "official recognition" or medals from the army for their involvement in the skirmish. Sergeant William McBryar of the 10th Cavalry, Sergeant Rowdy of the Apache scouts, and Sergeant James T. Daniels of the 4th Cavalry were awarded the Medal of Honor. McBryar received his for "coolness, bravery and marksmanship," he and Rowdy were the last Medal of Honor recipients for service during the Apache Wars. General Grierson later said; "This [skirmish] is one of the most brilliant affairs of its kind that has occurred in recent years and has had a very quieting effect upon, and will no doubt prove a lasting lesson to, the Indians of the San Carlos Agency. It was, therefore, extremely gratifying to congratulate the commanding officers of San Carlos and Fort Thomas, and especially Lieutenants Watson and Clarke and the troops under their command for the persistent pursuit and complete success. Such service in the execution of duty merits the highest praise and affords an excellent example of what promptness and indefatigable exertion may accomplish in the face of almost insurmountable obstacles. It was recommended that substantial recognition be promptly awarded in the way of brevets to the officers and medals to the enlisted men who took part in the engagement." Though five Apaches had been captured, the army's campaign against other off reservation Apaches continued because the Apache Kid was still at large. On March 10, just three days after the Cherry Creek engagement, General Grierson "authorized the arrest and removal of seventy-six Indians, relatives and friends of Kid and other Apaches, who were known to be in sympathy with the fugitives." General Grierson reported that he "did this as a measure of precaution and asked that [his] action be approved by the honorable Secretary of War, that proper arrangements might be made for their care and sustenance at Fort Union to which post they were sent under suitable guard. Since the arrival of Indian prisoners at Fort Union, in accordance with instructions received from Washington, twelve Indian children were selected from among them, and sent to the Kamona Indian school at Santa Fe, N. Mex." The rest eventually went to live at Mount Vernon Barracks, in Alabama, with other Apache prisoners.

== See also ==
- Skeleton Canyon shootout
- Cherry Creek ruins
- Apache–Mexico Wars
