= Y. B. Rowdy =

US Army Medal of Honor recipient (1862–1893)

Yuma William "Bill" Rowdy
- Born: c. 1862; Arizona
- Died: March 29, 1893; Miami, Arizona
- Burial place: Santa Fe National Cemetery, Santa Fe, New Mexico
- Military career
- Allegiance: United States of America
- Branch: United States Army
- Rank: Sergeant
- Unit: United States Army Indian scouts
- Conflicts: Apache Wars: Cherry Creek Campaign
- Awards: Medal of Honor

Yuma William "Bill" Rowdy (c. 1862 – March 29, 1893) was a United States Army Indian scout and a recipient of the United States military's highest decoration—the Medal of Honor—for his actions during the March 1890 Cherry Creek Campaign in the Arizona Territory.

== Military service ==
Rowdy, a Yavapai, was a Sergeant in Company A of the Indian Scouts. He was involved in an engagement in Arizona on March 7, 1890, and was awarded the Medal of Honor two months later, on May 15, 1890, for his "[b]ravery in [the] action with Apache Indians."

Rowdy was killed in a brothel in Miami, Arizona, nearly three years after earning the medal and was buried in Santa Fe National Cemetery, Santa Fe, New Mexico, with full military honors. His grave is in section A, grave 894.

== Medal of Honor citation ==
Rank and organization: Sergeant, Company A, Indian Scouts. Place and date: Arizona, March 7, 1890. Entered service at: ------. Birth: Arizona. Date of issue: May 15, 1890.

Citation:

Bravery in action with Apache Indians.

== See also ==
- List of Medal of Honor recipients
- List of Medal of Honor recipients for the Indian Wars
- List of Native American Medal of Honor recipients
