= William McBryar =

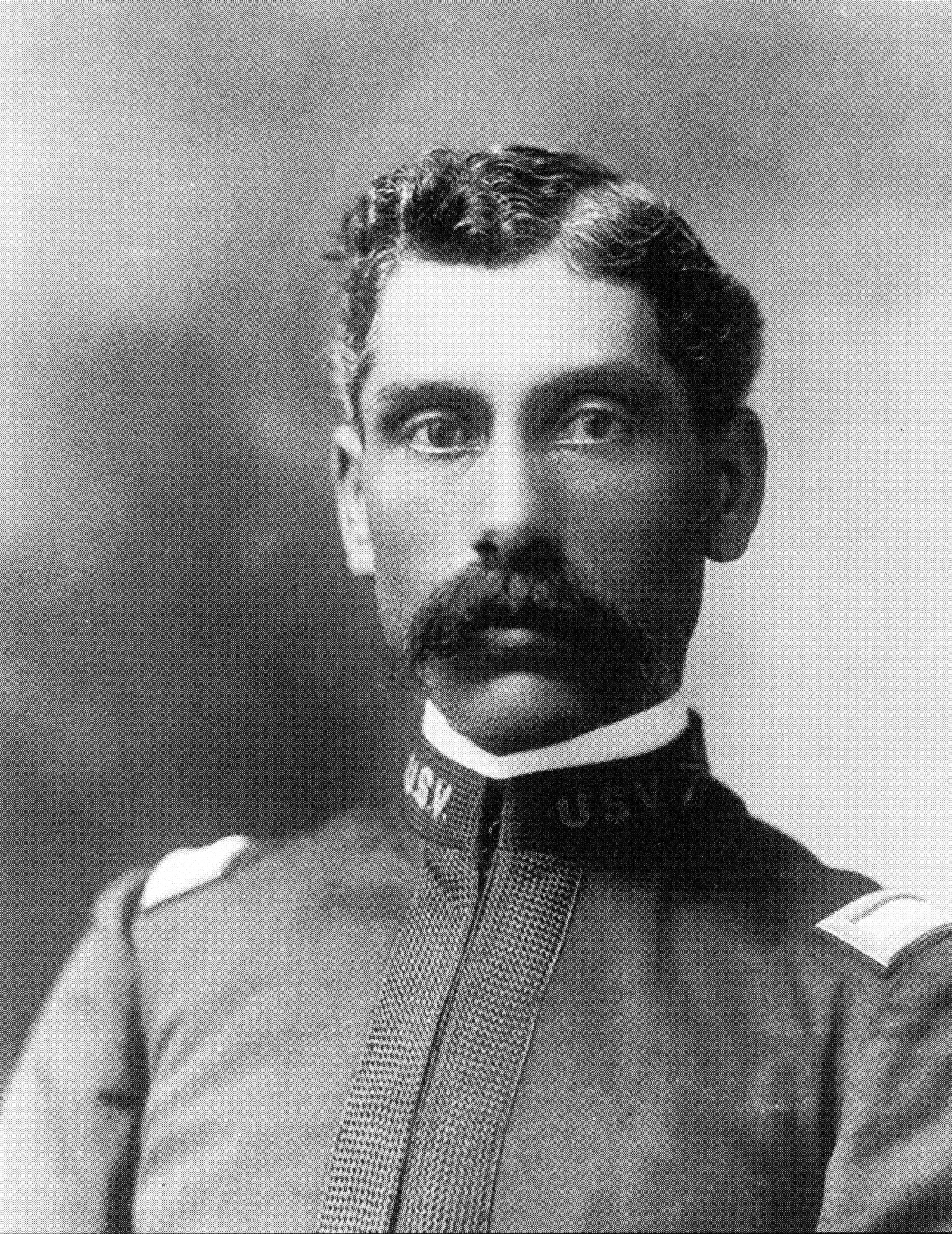
- Lieutenant William McBryar
- Born: February 14, 1861; Elizabethtown, North Carolina, U.S.
- Died: March 8, 1941 (aged 80); Philadelphia, Pennsylvania, U.S.
- Burial place: Arlington National Cemetery, Arlington, Virginia, U.S.
- Military career
- Allegiance: United States
- Branch: United States Army
- Service years: 1887–1900; 1905
- Rank: First Lieutenant
- Units: 10th Cavalry Regiment; 25th Infantry Regiment; 8th U. S. Volunteer Infantry; 49th U.S. Volunteer Infantry; 9th Cavalry Regiment
- Conflicts: Apache Wars: Cherry Creek Campaign; Spanish–American War Philippine–American War
- Awards: Medal of Honor

William McBryar (February 14, 1861 – March 8, 1941) was a Buffalo Soldier in the United States Army and a recipient of America's highest military decoration, the Medal of Honor, for his actions during the Cherry Creek Campaign in Arizona Territory.

== Early life and St. Augustine's Normal College ==
William McBryar was born February 14, 1861, in Elizabethtown, North Carolina to Rose Black. McBryar attended St. Augustine's Normal College starting in 1883 and entered the collegiate program in 1885. On his individual service report, his listed "physics, political [economy], science of government, sociology" as areas of professional or scientific study and investigation other than military. He also wrote that he studied "Latin and Spanish" and was able to speak Spanish. He left college one year prior to graduating and moved to New York City. There he was recorded on the census as a laborer.

== 10th Cavalry and Indian Campaign ==
McBryar enlisted in the 10th Cavalry on January 3, 1887, for a period of five years and requested assignment on the frontier. A Buffalo Soldier in the United States Army, he received America's highest military decoration – the Medal of Honor – for his actions during the March 7, 1890, Cherry Creek Campaign in Arizona Territory while serving as a sergeant in Company K of the 10th Cavalry Regiment. On that day, he participated in an engagement in Arizona where he "[d]istinguished himself for coolness, bravery and marksmanship while his troop was in pursuit of hostile Apache Indians." For his actions, Sergeant McBryar was awarded the Medal of Honor two months later, on May 15, 1890.

== Medal of Honor citation ==
Rank and organization: Sergeant, Company K, 10th U.S. Cavalry. Place and date: Salt River, Arizona, 7 March 1890. Entered service at: New York, N.Y. Birth: 14 February 1861, Elizabethtown, N.C. Date of issue: 15 May 1890.

Citation:

Distinguished himself for coolness, bravery and marksmanship while his troop was in pursuit of hostile Apache Indians.

== 25th Infantry, Spanish American War, and Commission ==
He reenlisted in the 25th Infantry and was deployed to the Spanish American War, serving with distinction at the Battle of El Caney, Cuba.

Capt E. A. Edwards, Capt, 25th Infantry wrote to the Adjutant General State of North Carolina in a May 30, 1898, stating

Sir,

I am informed by Sergeant William McBryar, Co. H. 25th Infantry, that his is an applicant for a commission in a colored regiment to be raised in North Carolina. I take pleasure in stating my belief that he is thoroughly competent to Command a Company in such a regiment. I Commanded H. Co. for a time and from my knowledge of him acquired while in that company can say he is intelligent, of good habits, unusual force, and more than average educational attainments. His knowledge & experience of field & officer work would be invaluable to a volunteer organization, and his courage is attested by the medal of honor earned by bravery in Indian Wrafare [sic]- Very Respectfully,

(S'g'd) E. A. Edwards,

Capt. 25th Infantry

A second letter furnished to McBryar from 1LT V.A. Caldwell in 1898 reads

Sir:-

I take great pleasure in furnishing you this letter and trust it may aid you in obtaining the commission you desire. As Sergeant and Quartermaster Sergeant Co. H 25th U.S. Infantry your services were above criticism. When this Company, H, landed in Cuba, there being but one commissioned officer with it, you were assigned to the command of its second platoon; at the action of El Caney, you brought this platoon on the firing line advancing it under a very hot fire from the Spaniards, setting its men an example of coolness, bravery and soldierly bearing that gave its fire action a maximum value. In commanding the point of the rear guard July 2, '98, in the march from near El Caney to San Juan hill, when the company in performing this duty was separated from the U.S. forces, and with the road in its rear open to the Spanish forces, who threatened an attack, you displayed the same qualities of good judgement and coolness which have been noted in the El Caney fight, also while held in reserve under fire July 2d at San Juan hill. The sam [sic] may be said of the threatened night attack July 2d. In assisting in laying out and superintending the construction of detached earth works occupying exposed positions in front of the [sic] our main line of works, around Santiago, and in easy range of the Spanish works you showed a sound theoretical and practical knowledge of this duty. The same may be said of you about advance rear guard and outpost duties. In the case of health and forethought as to the Subsistence of the company you proved yourself thoroughly efficient.--I believe you thoroughly competent in character and education to render the United States intelligence and valuable services as a commissioned officer.

(Sgd) V. A. Caldwell,

1st Lieut. 25th Inf.,

Comdg Co H 25th Inf,

throughout the Santiago de Cuba expedition.

For his gallantry, he received a commission as a First Lieutenant in the 8th U. S. Volunteer Infantry. A letter from the Adjutant General's Office, Washington dated September 7, 1898, to Col Huggins, Fort Thomas, Kentucky, states "McBryar, Goings and Gaither this day commissioned." LT McBryar accepted via Western Union Telegraph on September 13, 1898.

== 8th Immunes and Philippine Insurrection ==
McBryar was sworn in as a first lieutenant in the 8th U.S. Volunteer Infantry September 22, 1898, at Fort Thomas, Kentucky. His oath of office reads:

I, William McBryar, having been appointed a First Lieutenant, 8th U.S. Vol. Inf. in the military service of the United States, do solemnly swear (or affirm) that I will support and defend the Constitution of the United States against all enemies, foreign and domestic; that I will bear true faith and allegiance to the same; that I take this obligation freely, without any mental reservation or purpose of evasion; and that I will well and faithfully discharge the duties of the office on which I am about to enter:

So help me God.

William McBryar 8th U.S. V. Infantry

Sworn to and subscribed before me, at Fort Thomas Ky, this 22nd day of September, 1898.

AMHughes [Illegible] U.S. Vol. [Illegible]

1st Lieut. Wm. McBryar, 8th U.S. Vols., requests to be appointed in the 9th Vol. Infantry, as his regiment is about to be mustered out. McBryar got the medal of honor for gallantry in action against the Apaches March 8, 1890, and that and his gallantry at San Juan, secured him his present commission. He has hardly served long enough as a commissioned officer to reimburse him for his outfit, but the trouble is that we have a number of similar applications, and the few remaining immune regiments will not afford vacancies enough for more than one or two, and they are likely to be mustered out any day. His case appears certainly to be as deserving as any, but the best, that can be done is to keep him on the waiting list until a vacancy occurs, and then resubmit the case. In one respect he is better off than some other applicants, inasmuch as the expiration of his present commission he reverts to his position as Sergeant in the regular Army, and his service in the Vols. is credited in his longevity.

He accepted a commission as a 2LT in the 49th U.S. Volunteer Infantry and served with Company M, Piat, Luzon, Philippines during the Philippine–American War. In May 1900 he led a group of soldiers that captured an enemy guerilla unit in Cagayan. He was mustered out with his unit on June 1, 1900, at Presidio, California.

== Enlistment in the 9th Cavalry ==
McBryar reenlisted in 1905. A Declaration for Original Invalid Pension filed in the state of North Carolina, county of Guilford states

On this 8th day of June A. D. one thousand nine hundred and eleven personally appeared before me, a notary public within and for the county and State aforesaid, William McBryar, aged 50 years, a resident of Greensboro, county of Guilford resident of Greensboro, State of North Carolina, who being sworn according to law, declares that he is the identical person who was ENROLLED at Hickory, NC under the name of William McBryar on the 22d day of February, 1905, as a private in Troop G, 9th Cavalry (U.S.A.) and was DISCHARGED at Fort Leavenworth, Kans on the 19th day of December, 1905; that his personal description at enlistment was a follows: Age 42 years; height, 5 feet 5 1/2 inches; complexion [illegible] light; hair, grey; eyes, Bro #1. That while a member of the organization aforesaid, in the service and in the line of his duty at Fort Leavenworth, Kans. on or about the 22d day of March, 1905 he contracted rheumatism in his legs; that said rheumatism was of a mild nature at first, but is gradually growing worse, and is so severe at times as to render him unable to walk except by the aid of [illegible]. That he was treated in hospital as follows: at Fort Leavenworth, Kans. In hospital as stated above only. That he was employed in the military or naval service prior to February, 1905. That he has not been employed in the military or naval service since December 19, 1905.

He was discharged from the 9th Cavalry to accept a position in the U.S. Civil Service.

== Demobilization and marriage ==
He married Sallie B. Waugh on December 10, 1906, in Greensboro, North Carolina by Reverend J.G. Walker. A record is on file at the Greensboro, North Carolina Court House. This was the first marriage for both McBryar and Waugh, and no children were born to this union. Waugh died in 1928.

McBryar married again, to Lucy E. Sweatt of Lynch, Kentucky on July 13, 1933. But, this marriage failed and ended in divorce on July 20, 1938.

== Watchman at Arlington National Cemetery ==
McBryar worked as a watchman at the Arlington National Cemetery in 1909.

== Later career ==
After returning to his farm for two years, McBryar taught from 1911-1912 as a military instructor at Saint Paul's Normal and Industrial School near Lawrenceville, Virginia, a school historically for Black students when systems were segregated.

By 1914 he had migrated to the Northwest. He began working for the Federal Penitentiary Service at the federal prison on McNeil Island in Washington state on March 20, 1914.

McBryar had several jobs after this. He taught at a North Carolina school from 1924 – 1928. He attended school for four years. McBryar returned to teaching again in 1935.

== Tennessee State Agricultural and Industrial College ==
He graduated in 1934 at the age of 73 from Tennessee Agricultural and Industrial Teachers College, a land grant and historically black college, with a Bachelor of Science degree in Agriculture.

The following year he wrote this essay, which was published in The Bulletin of the school in May 1935:

Justice Discussed In Fine Essay: Scholar Gives Explanation; Declares It as Lifeline of a Nation, While Injustice Means Ruin" (An Essay by Lieutenant William McBryar, '34).

The word justice is one of the most potent in the English tongue. Justice has been thus defined: conformity in conduct or practice to the principles of right or of positive law; regard for or fulfillment of obligations. Two important synonyms are equity and fairness; equity is equal justice and is thus a close synonym for fairness. The chief distinction between the creation of civilization and the brute creation lies in that one word–justice. Over there in the wilds of nature the little birds have no police force, no national guard, no protection, know nothing of justice, of courts of law, and of jurisprudence. If the birds of prey are stronger than they are and swifter on the wing, the little birds become food for the birds of prey.

Out yonder in the briar patch, the rabbit has no army and no navy, and no protection except his fleetness of foot and his cunning. When these furnish him no escape, he becomes food for the hound and the fox. So on and on throughout the great animal kingdom, we have the rule of force, the consequence of which is bloodletting and suffering. Darwin called this the survival of the fittest. During the past generation, the great German philosopher Nietzsche proclaimed the doctrine of the super-man. With keen delight, he taught the German manhood to be hard and to be strong, and to rely upon their hardness and to rely upon their strength.

If I were required to explain the German initiation of the World War, were I to attempt to explain the recent substitution of German persecution for that culture for which the German people are renowned, and which produced that supremely excellent music of the generation just past: if I were required to account for those groundless and unseemly actions, which are a discredit to her great leadership. I should explain them in terms of the teaching of the philosopher Nietzsche. He has succeeded in inoculating the German blood with that barbaric spirit, which, in moments of sober thinking, may cause us to tremble for the future of our civilization.

What is the nature of that human weakness which seeks justice for itself and denies it to others? What is it within us which causes us to shudder at cruelty in the brute creation and to accept it with complacency among human beings? Why is justice glorified for one race as the supreme good and denied to another? It is a mental conception of the human which cannot be explained.

The average man in the English race has been fighting for more than a thousand years, trying to extract justice from the English ruling classes and make it secure for himself and his posterity forever. Justice is the life-line of a nation; injustice, the cancer which slowly eats away the heart. Let us call the roll of a few of the great empires of antiquity: Assyria, Syria, Babylonia, Persia, Greece, and Rome. Where is the Babylonian empire with its great wealth and power? What has become of Persia with her tremendous expanse of territory and might? What remains of the Grecian empire except her literature and her art? And Rome with her mighty armies? All of these mighty nations have perished on the rock of injustice. The world is littered with the remains of other dead empires which went likewise.

But in the hearts of men there is an instinct for justice which causes them to establish governments to protect the weak, to provide for the care of the children and the aged. This might properly include, justice in commerce in the courts, justice between men and men, justice among races, as well as the recent ambitious national program of social justice. Justice is the heart blood of civilization. Allow this to become stagnant, and the nation languishes and dies.

— From The Message Center, March, 1935 issue

== Death and burial ==
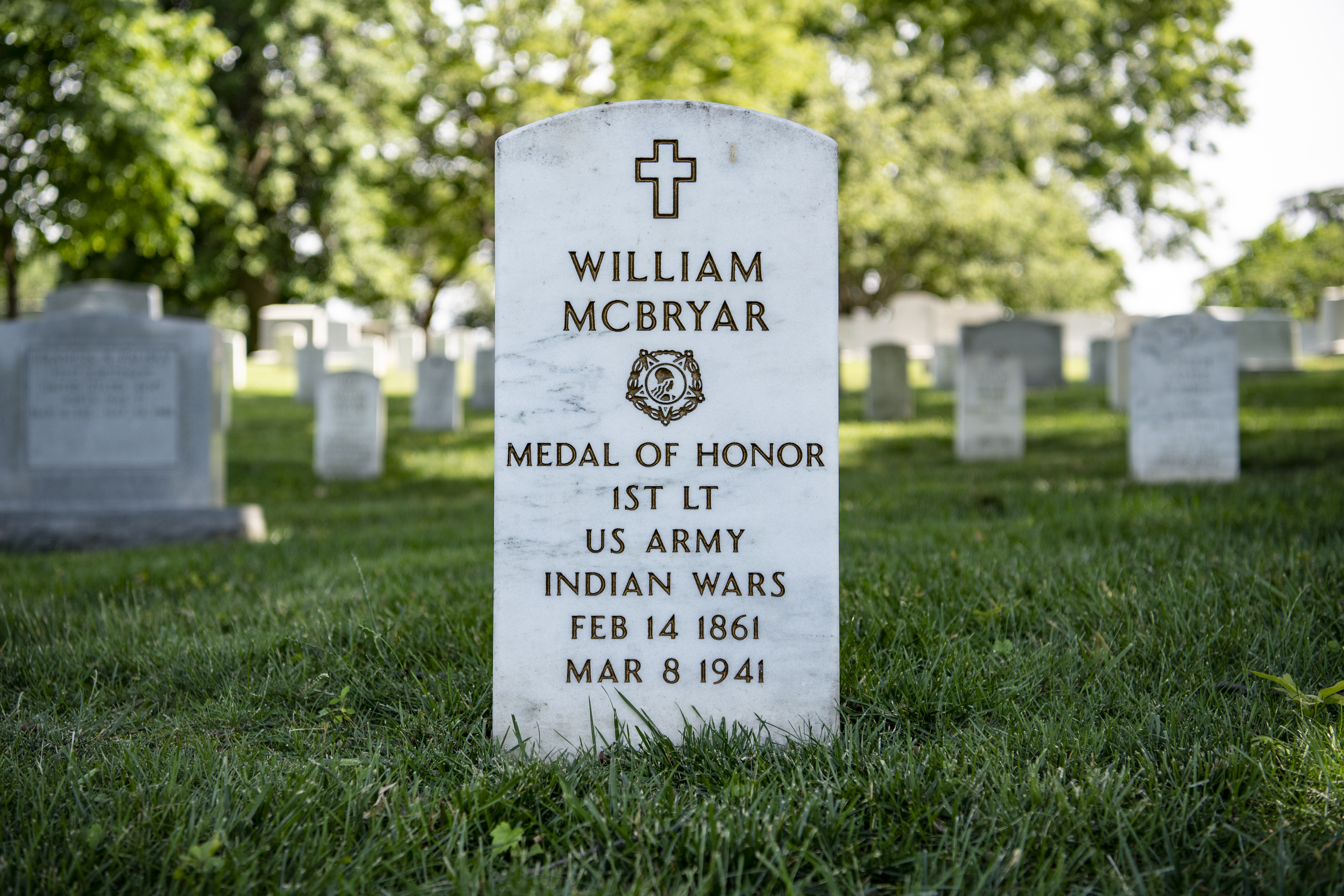
Grave at Arlington National Cemetery

He died at age 80 at Mercy Hospital, Philadelphia, Pennsylvania of cerebral thrombosis with arteriosclerosis as a contributory cause. He was buried in Arlington National Cemetery, Arlington County, Virginia. On December 16, 2017, members of Tennessee State University's Alumni Association took part in the annual Wreaths Across America and laid a memorial wreath at McBryar's grave.

== Honors ==
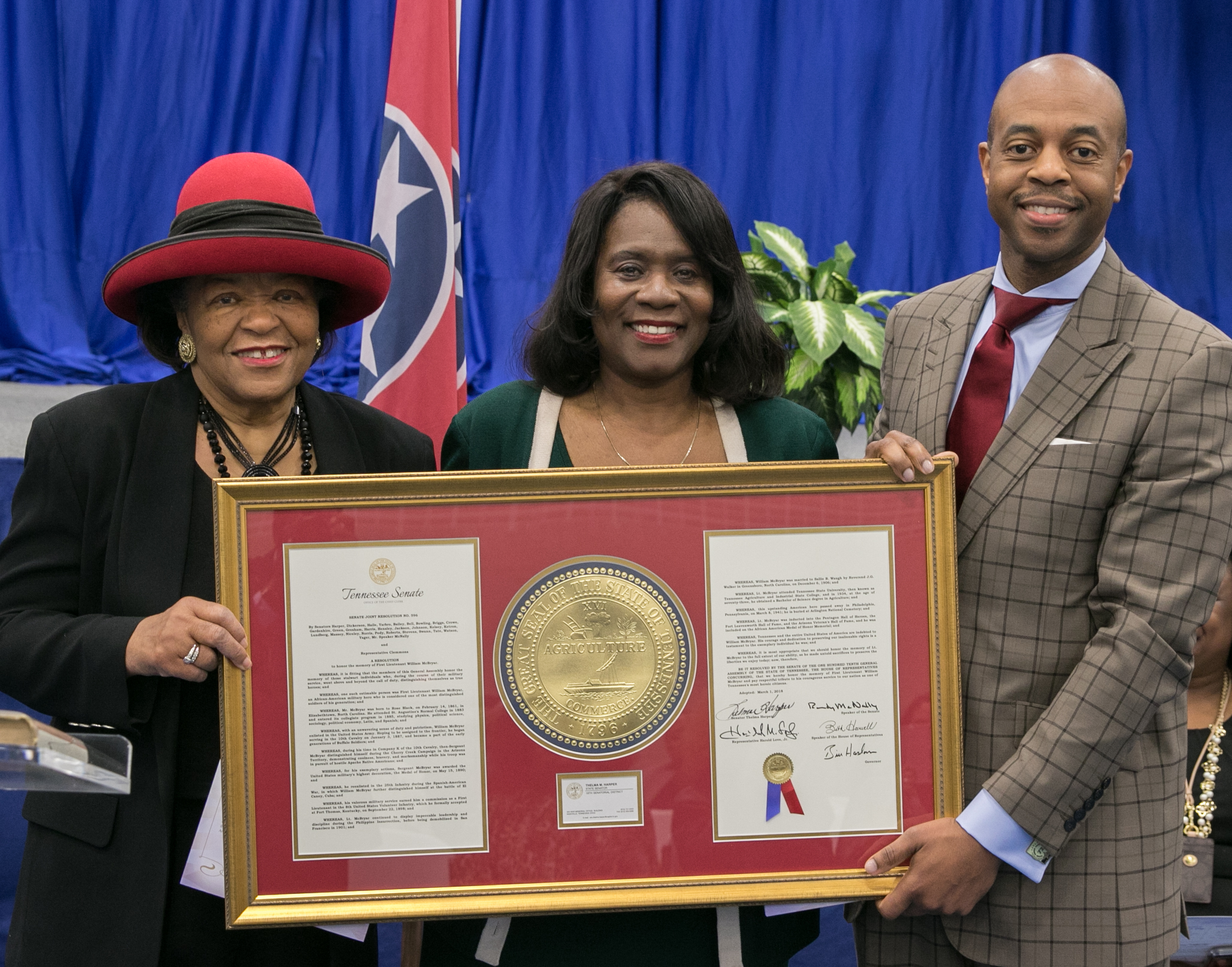
Senator Harper presents TSU President Glover the Tennessee resolution honoring McBryar.

- Induction into the Pentagon Hall of Heroes
- Induction into the Fort Leavenworth Hall of Fame
- Induction into the Arizona Veteran's Hall of Fame
- Inclusion on the African American Medal of Honor Memorial
- Inclusion on the Buffalo Soldiers Memorial at Huntsville, Alabama
- Tennessee State Senate Resolution honoring his accomplishments

=== Historical markers ===
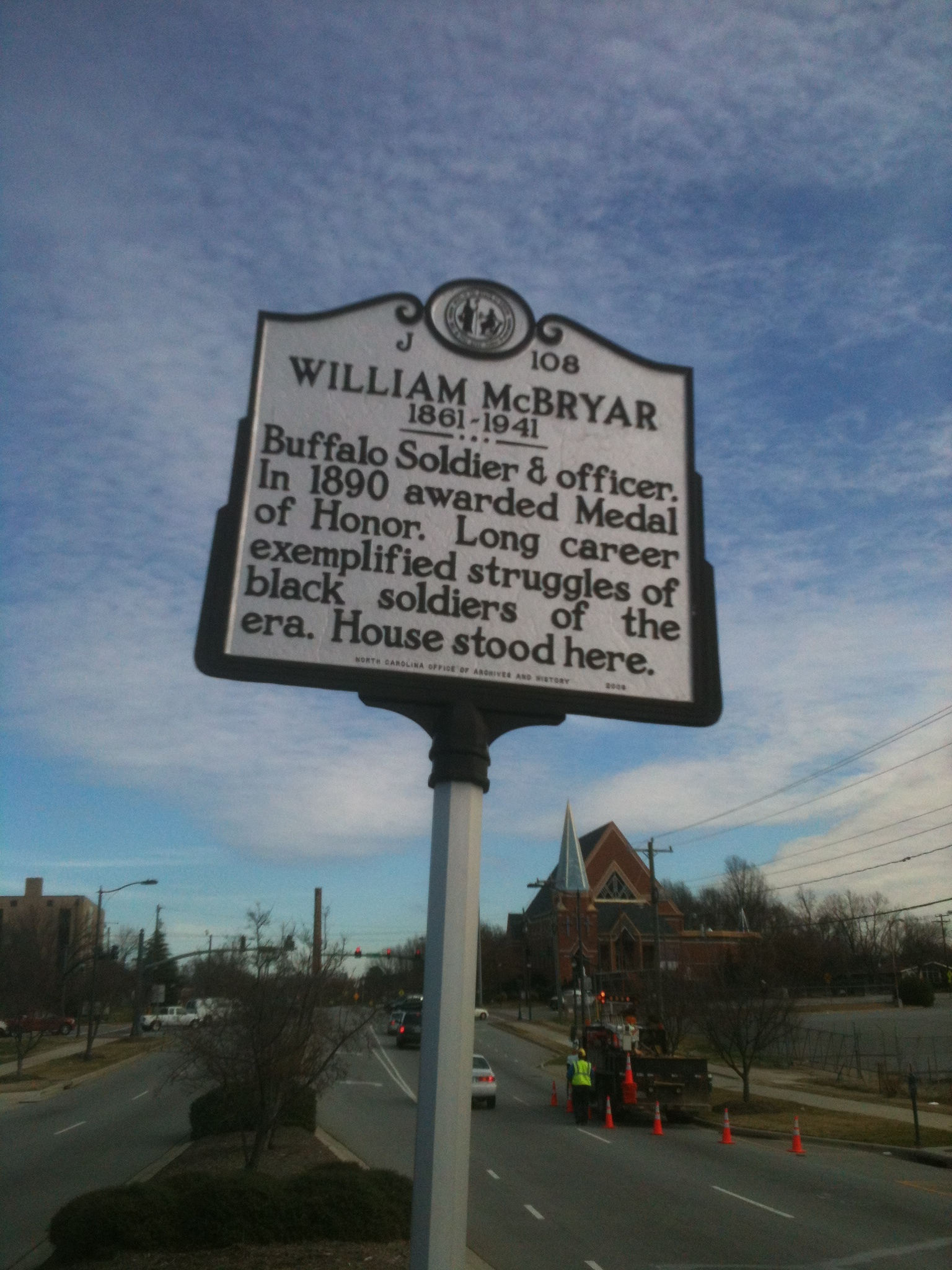
Historical marker

A historical marker in Elizabethtown, North Carolina marks the site of McBryar's childhood home. A second historical marker was unveiled at Tennessee State University in March 2018.

=== Topps baseball card ===
In 2009, Topps baseball cards produced a series of cards highlighting Medal of Honor recipients. LT William McBryar was featured on card #11.

=== Northwest Territorial Mint coin ===
In 2017, Northwest Territorial Mint produced 100 commemorative coins with McBryar's likeness. They were distributed to veterans at Tennessee State University's Veterans Day ceremony on November 10, 2017.

== Portraits ==
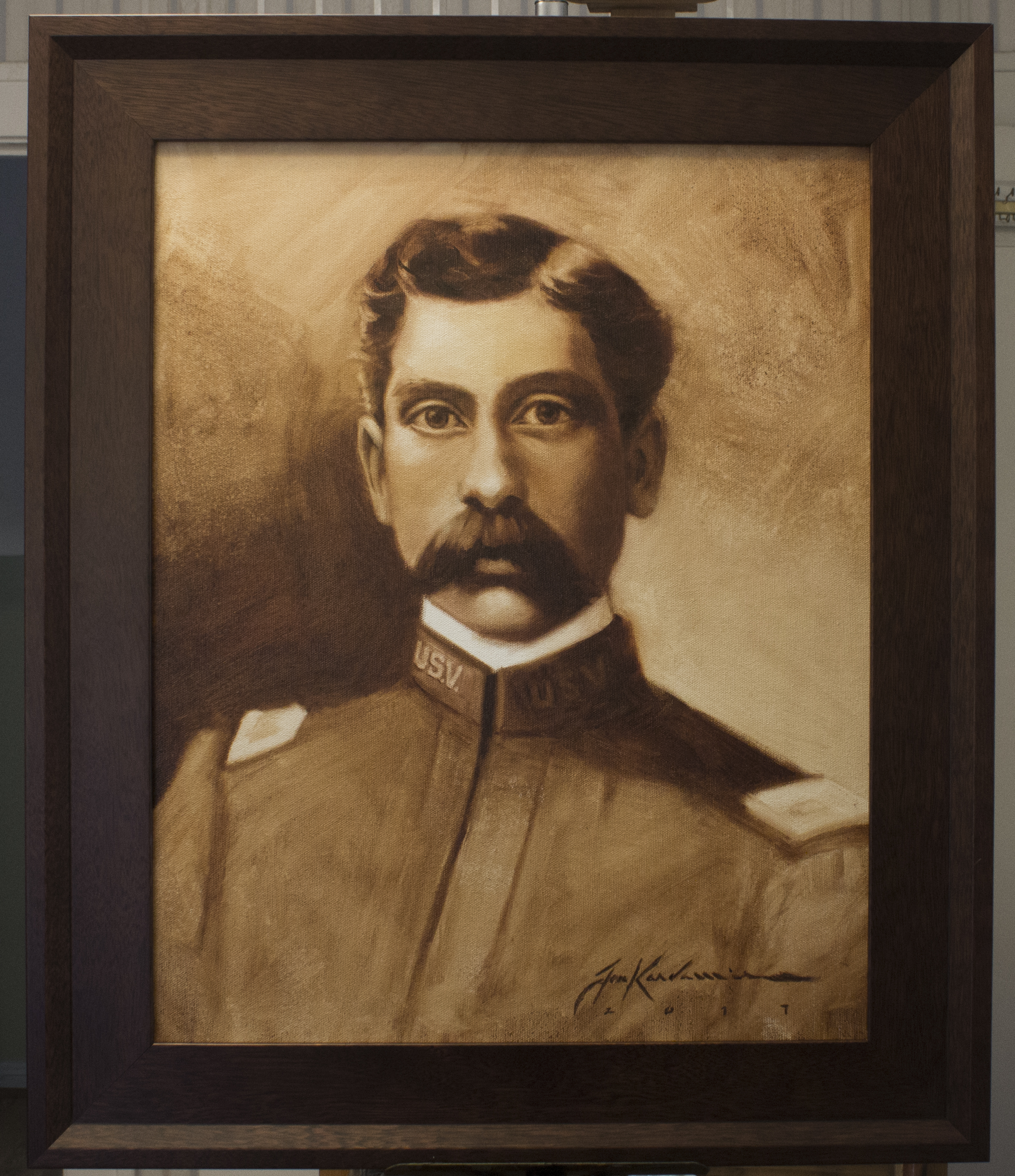
Original oil portrait of William McBryar painted by Jon Kardamis Fine Art

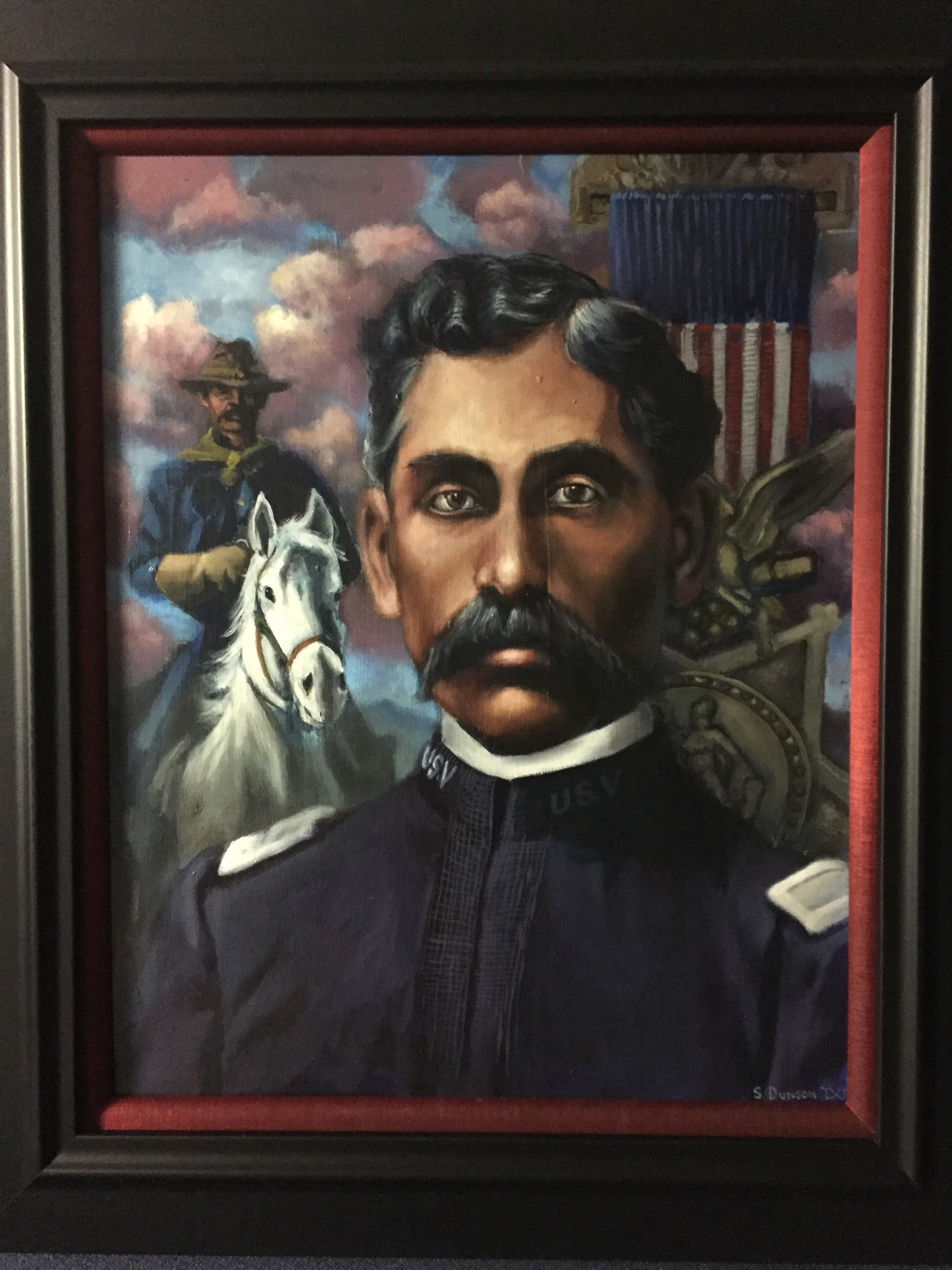
Original oil painting by Samuel Dunson on loan to Tennessee State University by a private collection.

Three portraits of McBryar are known to exist, an oil wash by artist Jon Kardamis, an oil painting by Samuel Dunson, and a drawing McBryar on horseback by Brandon Van Leer. All three belong to a private collection. Two are on temporary display at Tennessee State University. One is located at the Concierge in Phoenix, Arizona.

== See also ==
- List of Medal of Honor recipients
- List of Medal of Honor recipients for the Indian Wars
