= Co-Rux-Te-Chod-Ish =

- Born: circa 1847; Nebraska, United States
- Died: 12 February 1913
- Burial place: North Indian Cemetery, Pawnee County, Oklahoma, United States
- Military career
- Allegiance: United States of America
- Branch: United States Army
- Rank: Sergeant
- Unit: Pawnee Scouts
- Conflicts: Indian Wars
- Awards: Medal of Honor

Co-Rux-Te-Chod-Ish (English: Mad or Angry Bear) was a Sergeant in Company A, Pawnee Scout Battalion, US Army Pawnee and the first Indigenous recipient of the United States military's highest decoration—the Medal of Honor—for his actions in the Indian Wars of the western United States. He was the first Native American to receive the Medal of Honor.

== Biography ==
Kuruks Tîčaris (translated into English as Mad or Angry Bear, but is Pawnee for grizzly bear) was born circa 1847 in Nebraska, growing up as a Pawnee tribesman. He entered the U.S. Army at Columbus, Nebraska as an Indian Scout. On 8 July 1869, while chasing after a Cheyenne Dog Soldier near the Republican River in Kansas, he was thrown from his horse and was badly injured when another member of his unit shot him by mistake. Frank North's brother Luther North claimed that, because of the language barrier between the Pawnee and the Army, the name of Mad Bear was confused with the name of another Pawnee Scout, Co-Tux-A-Kah-Wadde (Traveling Bear), who was commended for his actions during the Battle of Summit Springs on 11 July 1869, and Traveling Bear was given a medal mistakenly engraved with Mad Bear's name. In reality, Mad Bear was not present in the fighting at the Battle of Summit Springs, still recovering from his injury, and Eugene Asa Carr's recommendation and the document acknowledging the receipt of the medal (bearing Mad Bear's English name and an "X" mark for his signature) both reference the actions of Mad Bear, not Traveling Bear. Mad Bear was the first Native American to receive the Medal of Honor. Co-Rux-Te-Chod-Ish died on 12 February 1913, at about age 65, and is buried in Oklahoma.

== Medal of Honor citation ==
Rank and organization: Sergeant, Pawnee Scouts, U.S. Army. Place and date: At Republican River, Kans., July 8, 1869. Entered service at: ------. Birth: Nebraska. Date of issue: August 24, 1869.

Citation:

Ran out from the command in pursuit of a dismounted Indian; was shot down and badly wounded by a bullet from his own command.

== See also ==
- List of Medal of Honor recipients for the Indian Wars
- List of Native American Medal of Honor recipients
