= Claron A. Windus =

United States Army Medal of Honor recipient

- Born: January 10, 1850; Janesville, Wisconsin
- Died: October 18, 1927 (aged 77)
- Burial place: Masonic Cemetery in Brackettville, Texas
- Military career
- Allegiance: United States of America
- Branch: Union Army; United States Army
- Service years: 1864–1865; 1866–1871; 1898–1899
- Rank: Captain
- Conflicts: American Civil War; American Indian Wars; Spanish–American War
- Awards: Medal of Honor

Claron Augustus Windus (January 10, 1850 – October 18, 1927) served in the United States Army during the American Civil War as a drummer boy, American Indian Wars as a bugler and the Spanish–American War as a captain. He received the Medal of Honor for bravery during a battle with the Kiowa Indians in 1870.

== Biography ==
Windus was born on January 10, 1850, in Janesville, Wisconsin. He served as a drummer boy during the American Civil War. Still under age, Windus lied about his age in order to join the 6th U.S. Cavalry Regiment. He received the Medal of Honor for bravery while serving as a bugler during a battle with the Kiowa in northern Texas on July 12, 1870.

Windus was mustered out of the army in 1871 and became a deputy sheriff at Brackettville, Texas. In 1877, Windus shot and killed a fellow Medal of Honor recipient Adam Paine, a Black Seminole, whom Windus was attempting to arrest as a murder suspect. This is the only known instance of one Medal of Honor recipient killing another. During the following 20 years, Windus was a customs inspector and deputy United States marshal.

In 1898, Windus became a volunteer commissioned officer and served as a captain in Company I of the 9th U.S. Volunteer Infantry Regiment during the Spanish–American War.

Claron A. Windus died at age 77 and was buried at the Masonic Cemetery in Brackettville, Texas.

== Medal of Honor ==
His award citation reads:

The President of the United States of America, in the name of Congress, takes pleasure in presenting the Medal of Honor to Bugler Claron Windus, United States Army, for gallantry in action on 12 July 1870, while serving with Company L, 6th U.S. Cavalry, at Wichita River, Texas.

== See also ==
- List of Medal of Honor recipients for the Indian Wars
