= William Alchesay =

United States Army Medal of Honor recipient (1853–1928)

Alchesay
- Tsájń (Western Apache)
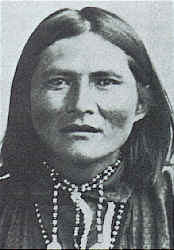
- Alchesay
- Born: May 17, 1853; New Mexico Territory, U.S. (now Arizona)
- Died: August 6, 1928 (aged 75); North Fork, Arizona, U.S.
- Burial place: Fort Apache Indian Reservation; Whiteriver, Arizona.
- Military career
- Allegiance: United States of America
- Branch: United States Army
- Rank: Sergeant
- Unit: U.S. Army Indian Scouts
- Conflicts: Indian Wars
- Awards: Medal of Honor

Alchesay, also known as William Alchesay, Alchisay and Alchise (Western Apache: Tsájń,, lit. '(the) Swollen'; May 17, 1853 – August 6, 1928), was a chief of the White Mountain Apache tribe and an Indian Scout. He received the United States military's highest decoration for bravery, the Medal of Honor, for his actions during the Indian Wars.

He tried to convince Geronimo to surrender peacefully on behalf of the United States government and remained friends with Geronimo until his death. After the wars were over he returned home to his wives and became a rancher and was active in Indian affairs.

== Biography ==
He was born May 17, 1853, in a part of the Arizona Territory known as Limestone Canyon. He joined the Indian Scouts at Camp Verde December 2, 1872 and served under General George Crook in actions against an uprising of the Chiricahua Apache in the winter of 1872–1873, holding the rank of sergeant. He was cited for gallantry, and acted as an envoy from Crook to Geronimo, trying to convince him to surrender peacefully.

Crook's aide (and fellow Medal of Honor recipient) John G. Bourke described Alchesay as "a perfect Adonis in figure, a mass of muscle and sinew of wonderful courage, great sagacity, and as faithful as an Irish hound." He was an adviser to Indian agents and to President Grover Cleveland. He fought again under Crook in the campaign against the Chiricahua Apache in the Sierra Madre of Mexico in 1883 and his last military duty was as an advisor during the pursuit of Geronimo in Mexico in 1885.

The Apache Wars officially ended with the surrender of Geronimo in 1886 and Alchesay returned to his family and his home. He became a successful cattleman and farmer, living for a while in Forestdale and later in North Fork. Plural marriage was an Apache custom, and was recognized by the U.S. government. Alchesay had three wives. His first wife was a young girl named Apache who bore him a son. In 1871, he married Tah-jon-nay. Then, ten years later in 1881, he married Tah-jon-nay's sister, Anna.

As the leader of the Tribe, Alchesay sought better conditions for his people, and in 1887 traveled to Washington D.C. to speak to President Grover Cleveland. He met with President Theodore Roosevelt in 1909, and with Warren G. Harding in 1921. The military left Fort Apache, and in 1923, the Theodore Roosevelt Indian Boarding School was built for Navajo children. Alchesay traveled to Navajo county to welcome Navajo children to the White Mountain Apache reservation. He was instrumental in getting federal compensation for the families that were removed because of the school.

He and Geronimo remained close friends until Geronimo's death in 1909. He filed for an Indian Wars pension under the name William Alchesay and resigned from active chieftainship in 1925. Alchesay died August 6, 1928, at North Fork, Arizona and is buried on the Fort Apache Indian Reservation in Whiteriver, Arizona.

== Honors and awards ==
=== Medal of Honor citation ===
Rank and organization: Sergeant, Indian Scouts. Place and date: Winter of 1872–73. Entered service at: Camp Verde, Ariz. Born: 1853, Arizona Territory. Date of issue: April 12, 1875.

Citation:

Gallant conduct during campaigns and engagements with Apaches.

=== Other honors ===
Alchesay Canyon in Maricopa County, Arizona, near Roosevelt Dam, is named for William Alchesay. Alchesay High School in Whiteriver is named in his honor as are Alchesay Barracks at Fort Huachuca, Arizona, and the Alchesay National Fish Hatchery in Navajo County, Arizona.

== See also ==
- List of Medal of Honor recipients for the Indian Wars
