= Blanquet =

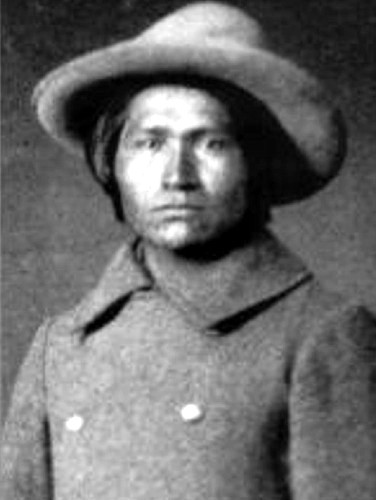
- Blanquet in 1875.
- Born: Arizona
- Military career
- Allegiance: United States of America
- Branch: United States Army
- Rank: Indian Scout
- Conflicts: Indian Wars • Apache Wars
- Awards: Medal of Honor

Blanquet was an Indian Scout in the United States Army and a recipient of the U.S. military's highest decoration, the Medal of Honor, for his actions in the Indian Wars of the western United States.

An Apache born in Arizona, Blanquet served as a scout for General George Crook during the Apache Wars. For his participation in campaigns through the winter of 1872–1873, he was awarded the Medal of Honor two years later, on April 12, 1875.

Blanquet's official Medal of Honor citation reads:

Gallant conduct during campaigns and engagements with Apaches.

== See also ==
- List of Medal of Honor recipients for the Indian Wars
- List of Native American Medal of Honor recipients
