= Chiquito (Medal of Honor) =

United States Army Medal of Honor recipient

- Born: Arizona Territory
- Military career
- Allegiance: United States of America
- Branch: United States Army
- Unit: U.S. Army Indian Scouts
- Conflicts: American Indian Wars
- Awards: Medal of Honor

Chiquito was a United States Army Indian scout and a recipient of the United States military's highest decoration—the Medal of Honor—for his actions in the Indian Wars of the western United States. He was chief of a band of the Pinal Coyotero, and a petty chief of the Apache.

Chiquito was awarded the Medal of Honor on April 12, 1875 for his "[g]allant conduct during campaigns and engagements with Apaches" in the "winter of 1871-73 [sic]".

== Medal of Honor citation ==
Rank and organization: Indian Scouts. Place and date: Winter of 1871-73. Entered service at: ------. Birth: Arizona. Date of issue: April 12, 1875.

Citation:

Gallant conduct during campaigns and engagements with Apaches.

In 1980 the star-shaped planchette from Chiquito's Medal of Honor was found in the Arizona desert[Citation?].

== See also ==
- List of Medal of Honor recipients
- List of Medal of Honor recipients for the Indian Wars
- List of Native American Medal of Honor recipients
