= Machol =

US Army Medal of Honor recipient from the Indian Wars

- Born: Arizona
- Military career
- Allegiance: United States of America
- Branch: United States Army
- Rank: Private
- Unit: Indian Scouts
- Conflicts: Indian Wars
- Awards: Medal of Honor

Machol was a private serving as an Indian Scout in the United States Army during the Indian Wars who received the Medal of Honor for bravery.

== Biography ==
Machol was born in Arizona and after entering the army served as a scout in the Indian Wars. He received the Medal of Honor for "engagements with Apaches".

== Medal of Honor citation ==
Rank and organization: Private, Indian Scouts. Place and date: Arizona, 1872–73. Entered service at: ------. Birth: Arizona. Date of issue: 12 April 1875

Citation:

Gallant conduct during campaigns and engagements with Apaches.

== Burial ==
His date and place of death are unknown. A cenotaph in his honor is maintained at the Arizona Veterans Memorial Cemetery in Marana, Pima County, Arizona.

== See also ==
- List of Medal of Honor recipients for the Indian Wars
