= Kelsay =

United States Army Medal of Honor recipient

- Born: Arizona
- Military career
- Allegiance: United States of America
- Branch: United States Army
- Unit: Indian Scouts
- Conflicts: Indian Wars
- Awards: Medal of Honor

Kelsay was an Indian scout serving in the United States Army during the Indian Wars who received the Medal of Honor for bravery.

== Biography ==
Kelsay was born in Arizona and after entering the army served as a scout in the Indian Wars. He received the Medal of Honor for "engagements with Apaches".

== Medal of Honor citation ==
Rank and organization: Indian Scouts. Place and date: Winter of 1872–73. Entered service at:------. Birth: Arizona. Date of issue: 12 April 1875.

Citation:

Gallant conduct during campaigns and engagements with Apaches.

== See also ==
- List of Medal of Honor recipients for the Indian Wars
