= List of Medal of Honor recipients for the Indian Wars =

The Indian Wars is the name used by the United States government to describe a series of military conflicts between the United States and Indigenous peoples from 1776 to 1898.

== Medal of Honor ==
The Medal of Honor was created during the American Civil War and is the highest military decoration presented by the United States government to a member of its armed forces. Receiving the award did not originally require that the recipient must have distinguished themselves at the risk of their own life above and beyond the call of duty in action against an enemy of the United States; that language was added later.

Due to the nature of this medal, it is commonly presented posthumously.

== A ==
Image	Name	Service	Rank	Place of action	Date of action	Unit	Notes
	George E. Albee	Army	First Lieutenant	Brazos River, Texas	Oct 28, 1869	41st U.S. Infantry	Attacked with 2 men a force of 11 Indians, drove them from the hills, and reconnoitered the country beyond.
	William Alchesay	Army	Sergeant	Arizona Territory	Winter of 1872–73	Indian Scouts	Gallant conduct during campaigns and engagements with Apaches.
—	William Allen	Army	First Sergeant	Turret Mountain, Arizona Territory	Mar 27, 1873	Company I, 23d U.S. Infantry	"Gallantry in action."
—	James Anderson	Army	Private	Wichita River, Texas	Oct 5, 1870	Company M, 6th U.S. Cavalry	Gallantry during the pursuit and fight with Indians.
	Edgar R. Aston	Army	Private	San Carlos, Arizona Territory	May 30, 1868	Company L, 8th U.S. Cavalry	With two other men, voluntarily scouted hostile terrain to find a wagon passage and held off an Apache attack
—	William G. Austin	Army	Sergeant	Wounded Knee Creek, South Dakota	Dec 29, 1890	Company E, 7th U.S. Cavalry	While the Indians were concealed in a ravine, assisted men on the skirmish line, directing their fire, etc., and using every effort to dislodge the enemy.
—	James F. Ayers	Army	Private	Sappa Creek, Kansas	Apr 23, 1875	Company H, 6th U.S. Cavalry	Rapid pursuit, gallantry, energy, and enterprise in an engagement with Indians.

== B ==
This along with the †, indicates that the Medal of Honor was awarded posthumously

Image	Name	Service	Rank	Place of action	Date of action	Unit	Notes
	John B. Babcock	Army	First Lieutenant	Spring Creek, Nebraska	May 16, 1869	5th U.S. Cavalry	Led his men in their defense against an attack by a superior force of Indians.
—	James E. Bailey	Army	Sergeant		Winter of 1872–73	Company E, 5th U.S. Cavalry	Gallant conduct during campaigns and engagements with Apaches.
	George W. Baird	Army	First Lieutenant and Adjutant	Bear Paw Mountain, Montana Territory	Sep 30, 1877	5th U.S. Infantry	Most distinguished gallantry in action with the Nez Perce Indians.
—	John Baker	Army	Musician	Cedar Creek, etc., Montana Territory	Oct 1876 – Jan 1877	Company D, 5th U.S. Infantry	Gallantry in engagements.
Frank D. Baldwin	Frank D. Baldwin	Army	First Lieutenant	McClellans Creek, Texas	Nov 8, 1874	5th U.S. Infantry	For rescuing two girls being held by Native Americans. Second award, previously received a Medal for actions in the Civil War.
—	Neil Bancroft	Army	Private	Little Big Horn, Montana Territory	Jun 25, 1876	Company A, 7th U.S. Cavalry	Brought water for the wounded under a most galling fire.
	Will C. Barnes	Army	Private First Class	Fort Apache, Arizona Territory	Sep 11, 1881	Signal Corps	Bravery in action in Arizona. The Army Reserve center in Phoenix, Arizona is named for him.
—	Richard Barrett	Army	First Sergeant	Sycamore Canyon, Arizona Territory	May 23, 1872	Company A, 1st U.S. Cavalry	Conspicuous gallantry in a charge upon the Tonto Apaches.
	Clay Beauford	Army	First Sergeant	Army	Winter of 1872–73	Company B, 5th U.S. Cavalry	Gallant conduct during campaigns and engagements with Apaches.
—	James J. Bell	Army	Private	Big Horn, Montana Territory	Jul 9, 1876	Company E, 7th U.S. Infantry	Carried dispatches to Gen. Crook at the imminent risk of his life.
—	Frederick Bergendahl	Army	Private	Staked Plains, Texas	Dec 8, 1874	4th U.S. Cavalry	Gallantry in a long chase after Indians.
—	Heinrich Bertram	Army	Corporal	Arizona Territory	1868	8th U.S. Cavalry	Bravery in scouts and actions against Indians.
—	Charles A. Bessey	Army	Corporal	Near Elkhorn Creek, Wyoming Territory	Jan 13, 1877	Company A, 3rd U.S. Cavalry	Led his men in a defense against an Indian attack, helped the wounded although wounded himself
—	Daniel Bishop	Army	Sergeant	Turret Mountain, Arizona Territory	Mar 25, 1873	Company A, 5th U.S. Cavalry	Gallantry in engagements.
—	James Blair	Army	First Sergeant	Army	Winter of 1872–73	Company I, 1st U.S. Cavalry	Gallant conduct during campaigns and engagements with Apaches.
—	Blanquet	Army	Indian Scout	Army	Winter of 1872–73		Gallant conduct during campaigns and engagements with Apaches.
—	Samuel Bowden	Army	Corporal	Wichita River, Texas	Oct 5, 1870	Company M, 6th U.S. Cavalry	Gallantry in pursuit of and fight with Indians.
—	Alonzo Bowman	Army	Sergeant	Cibicu Creek, Arizona Territory	Aug 30, 1881	Company D, 6th U.S. Cavalry	Conspicuous and extraordinary bravery in attacking mutinous scouts.
—	Thomas Boyne	Army	Sergeant	Mimbres Mountains, N. Mex. and Cuchillo Negro River near Ojo Caliente, New Mexico Territory	May 29, 1879 and Sep 27, 1879	Company C, 9th U.S. Cavalry	Bravery in action.
—	Sanford Bradbury	Army	First Sergeant	Hell Canyon, Arizona Territory	Jul 3, 1869	Company L, 8th U.S. Cavalry	Conspicuous gallantry in action.
—	Edward Branagan	Army	Private	Red River, Texas	Sep 29, 1872	Company F, 4th U.S. Cavalry	"Gallantry in action."
—	Abram B. Brant †	Army	Private	Little Big Horn, Montana Territory	Jun 25, 1876	Company D, 7th U.S. Cavalry	Brought water for the wounded under a most galling fire.
—	Frank Bratling †	Army	Corporal	Near Fort Selden, New Mexico Territory	Jul 8, 1873 – Jul 11, 1873	Company C, 8th U.S. Cavalry	Services against hostile Indians.
	Lloyd M. Brett	Army	Second Lieutenant	O'Fallons Creek, Montana Territory	Apr 1, 1880	2nd U.S. Cavalry	Fearless exposure and dashing bravery in cutting off the Indians' pony herd, thereby greatly crippling the hostiles.
—	James Brogan	Army	Sergeant	Simon Valley, Arizona Territory	Dec 14, 1877	Company G, 6th U.S. Cavalry	Engaged singlehanded 2 renegade Indians until his horse was shot under him and then pursued them so long as he was able.
—	James Brophy	Army	Private	Arizona Territory	1868	Company B, 8th U.S. Cavalry	Bravery in scouts and actions against Indians.
—	Benjamin Brown	Army	Sergeant	Arizona Territory	May 11, 1889	Company C, 24th U.S. Infantry	Although shot in the abdomen, in a fight between a paymaster's escort and robbers, did not leave the field until again wounded through both arms.
—	James Brown	Army	Sergeant	Davidson Canyon near Camp Crittenden, Arizona Territory	Aug 27, 1872	Company F, 5th U.S. Cavalry	In command of a detachment of 4 men defeated a superior force.
—	Lorenzo D. Brown	Army	Private	Big Hole, Montana Territory	Aug 9, 1877	Company A, 7th U.S. Infantry	After having been severely wounded in right shoulder, continued to do duty in a most courageous manner.
	William C. Bryan	Army	Hospital Steward	Powder River, Montana Territory	Mar 17, 1876		Accompanied a detachment of cavalry in a charge on a village of hostile Indians and fought through the engagements, having his horse killed under him. He continued to fight on foot, and under severe fire and without assistance conveyed 2 wounded comrades to places of safety, saving them from capture.
	Oscar Burkard	Army	Private	Battle of Sugar Point, Leech Lake, Minnesota	Oct 5, 1898	Hospital Corps	Tended Wounded under fire; last Medal of Honor awarded for Indian Wars.
—	Patrick J. Burke	Army	Farrier	Arizona Territory	1868	Company B, 8th U.S. Cavalry	Bravery in scouts and actions against Indians.
—	Richard Burke	Army	Private	Cedar Creek, etc., Montana Territory	Oct 1876 – Jan 1877	Company G, 5th U.S. Infantry	Gallantry in engagements.
	George R. Burnett	Army	Second Lieutenant	Cuchillo Negro Mountains, New Mexico Territory	Aug 16, 1881	2nd US Cavalry	Saved the life of a dismounted soldier, who was in imminent danger of being cut off, by alone galloping quickly to his assistance under heavy fire and escorting him to a place of safety, his horse being twice shot in this action.
	Edmond Butler	Army	Captain	Wolf Mountains, Montana Territory	Jan 8, 1877	Company C, 5th U.S. Infantry	Most distinguished gallantry in action with hostile Indians.
—	Denis Byrne	Army	Sergeant	Cedar Creek, etc., Montana Territory	Oct 1876 – Jan 1877	Company G, 5th U.S. Infantry	Gallantry in engagements.

== C ==
Image	Name	Service	Rank	Place of action	Date of action	Unit	Notes
—	Joseph Cable	Army	Private	Cedar Creek, etc., Montana Territory	Oct 1876 – Jan 1877	Company I, 5th US Infantry	"Gallantry in action."
	Thomas J. Callan	Army	Private	Little Big Horn, Montana Territory	Jun 25, 1876 – Jun 26, 1876	Company B, 7th US Cavalry	Displayed conspicuously good conduct in assisting to drive away the Indians; Surname misspelled "Callen" on citation
	James S. Calvert	Army	Private	Cedar Creek, etc., Montana Territory	Oct 1876 – Jan 1877	Company C, 5th US Infantry	"Gallantry in action."
—	Heth Canfield	Army	Private	Little Blue, Nebraska	May 15, 1870	Company C, 2nd US Cavalry	"Gallantry in action."
	Louis H. Carpenter	Army	Captain	Indian campaigns, Kansas and Colorado	Sep 1868 – Oct 1868	Company H, 10th US Cavalry	Was gallant and meritorious throughout the campaigns, especially in the combat of October 15 and in the forced march on September 23, 24 and 25 to the relief of Forsyth's Scouts, who were known to be in danger of annihilation by largely superior forces of Indians
—	John Carr	Army	Private	Chiricahua Mountains, Arizona Territory	Oct 29, 1869	Company G, 8th US Cavalry	"Gallantry in action."
—	Thomas Carroll	Army	Private	Arizona Territory	Aug 1868 – Oct 1868	Company L, 8th US Cavalry	Bravery in scouts and actions against Indians.
—	George Carter	Army	Private	Arizona Territory	Aug 1868 – Oct 1868	Company B, 8th US Cavalry	Bravery in scouts and actions against Indians.
	Mason Carter	Army	First Lieutenant	Bear Paw Mountain, Montana Territory	Sep 30, 1877	5th US Cavalry	Led a charge under a galling fire, in which he inflicted great loss upon the enemy.
	Robert G. Carter	Army	Second Lieutenant	On Brazos, River, Texas	Oct 10, 1871	4th US Cavalry	Held the left of the line with a few men during the charge of a large body of Indians, after the right of the line had retreated, and by delivering a rapid fire succeeded in checking the enemy until other troops came to the rescue.
	William H. Carter	Army	First Lieutenant	Cibicu, Arizona Territory	Aug 30, 1881	6th US Cavalry	Rescued, with the voluntary assistance of 2 soldiers, the wounded from under a heavy fire.
James S. Casey	James S. Casey	Army	Captain	Wolf Mountain, Montana Territory	Jan 8, 1877	Company A, 5th US Infantry	Led his command in a successful charge against superior numbers of the enemy strongly posted.
—	Amos Chapman	Army	Civilian Scout	Washita River, Texas	Sep 12, 1874		"Gallantry in action." Was one of fewer than 10 civilians in history to receive the Medal of Honor. All four cavalry troopers and two civilian scouts in Zachariah T. Woodall's courier detail were awarded the Medal of Honor for this hours-long battle along the Washita River (some texts say Wichita River, a more southerly tributary of the same Red River of the South watershed).
	Benjamin H. Cheever, Jr.	Army	First Lieutenant	White River, South Dakota	Jan 1, 1891	6th US Cavalry	Headed the advance across White River partly frozen, in a spirited movement to the effective assistance of Troop K, 6th U.S. Cavalry.
—	Chiquito	Army	Indian Scout	Army	Winter of 1871–73	Indian Scouts	Gallant conduct during campaigns and engagements with Apaches.
—	John E. Clancy	Army	Musician	Wounded Knee Creek, South Dakota	Dec 29, 1890	Company E, 1st US Artillery	Twice voluntarily rescued wounded comrades under fire of the enemy.
—	Wilfred Clark	Army	Private	Big Hole, Mont. and Camas Meadows, Idaho Territory	Aug 9, 1877 and Aug 20, 1877	Company L, 2nd US Cavalry	Conspicuous gallantry, especial skill as sharpshooter.
	Powhatan H. Clarke	Army	Second Lieutenant	Pinito Mountains, Sonora, Mex.	May 3, 1886	10th US Cavalry	Rushed forward to the rescue of a soldier who was severely wounded and lay, disabled, exposed to the enemy's fire, and carried him to a place of safety.
	William F. Cody	Army	Civilian Scout	Platte River, Nebraska	Apr 26, 1872	Civilian Scout with 3rd US Cavalry	"Gallantry in action." Later known as the legendary westerner and showman Buffalo Bill Cody.
	John W. Comfort	Army	Corporal	Staked Plains, Texas	Nov 5, 1874	Company A, 4th US Cavalry	Ran down and killed an Indian.
—	John Connor	Army	Corporal	Wichita River, Texas	Jul 12, 1870	Company H, 6th US Cavalry	"Gallantry in action."
—	Aquilla Coonrod	Army	Sergeant	Cedar Creek, etc., Montana Territory	Oct 1876 – Jan 1877	Company C, 5th US Infantry	"Gallantry in action."
—	Michael Corcoran	Army	Corporal	Agua Fria River, Arizona Territory	Aug 25, 1869	Company E, 8th US Cavalry	"Gallantry in action."
—	Co-Rux-Te-Chod-Ish	Army	Sergeant	Republican River, Kansas	Jul 8, 1869	Pawnee Scouts	Also known as "Mad Bear"
—	Samuel H. Craig	Army	Sergeant	Santa Cruz Mountains, Mex.	May 15, 1886	Company D, 4th US Cavalry	Conspicuous gallantry during an attack on a hostile Apache Indian Camp; seriously wounded.
—	Charles Crandall	Army	Private	Arizona Territory	Aug 1868 – Oct 1868	Company B, 8th US Cavalry	Bravery in scouts and actions against Indians.
—	John Crist	Army	Sergeant	Arizona Territory	Nov 26, 1869	Company L, 8th US Cavalry	"Gallantry in action."
	Benjamin C. Criswell	Army	Sergeant	Little Big Horn River, Montana Territory	Jun 25, 1876	Company B, 7th US Cavalry	Rescued the body of Lt. Hodgson from within the enemy's lines; brought up ammunition and encouraged the men in the most exposed positions under heavy fire.
	Thomas Cruse	Army	Second Lieutenant	Big Dry Fork, Arizona Territory	Jul 17, 1882	6th US Cavalry	Gallantly charged hostile Indians, and with his carbine compelled a party of them to keep under cover of their breastworks, thus being enabled to recover a severely wounded soldier.
	William G. Cubberly	Army	Private	San Carlos, Arizona Territory	May 30, 1868	Company L, 8th US Cavalry	With 2 other men he volunteered to search for a wagon passage out of a 4,000-foot valley wherein an infantry column was immobile. This small group passed 6 miles among hostile Apache terrain finding the sought passage. On their return trip down the canyon they were attacked by Apache who were successfully held at bay.
—	Charles Cunningham	Army	Corporal	Little Big Horn River, Montana Territory	Jun 25, 1876	Company B, 7th US Cavalry	Declined to leave the line when wounded in the neck during heavy fire and fought bravely all next day.

== D ==
This along with the †, indicates that the Medal of Honor was awarded posthumously

Image	Name	Service	Rank	Place of action	Date of action	Unit	Notes
—	Charles Daily	Army	Private	Arizona Territory	Aug 1868 – Oct 1868	Company B, 8th US Cavalry	Bravery in scouts and actions against Indians.
—	James T. Daniels	Army	Sergeant	Arizona Territory	Mar 7, 1890	Company L, 4th US Cavalry	Untiring energy and cool gallantry under fire in an engagement with Apache Indians.
—	Michael Dawson	Army	Trumpeter	Sappa Creek, Kansas	Apr 23, 1875	Company H, 6th US Cavalry	"Gallantry in action."
	Matthias W. Day	Army	Second Lieutenant	Las Animas Canyon, New Mexico Territory	Sep 18, 1879	9th US Cavalry	Removed a wounded comrade, under a heavy fire, to a place of safety.
—	William L. Day	Army	First Sergeant	Army	1872–73	Company E, 5th US Cavalry	Gallant conduct during campaigns and engagements with Apaches.
—	William De Armond †	Army	Sergeant	Upper Washita, Texas	Sep 9, 1874 – Sep 11, 1874	Company I, 5th US Infantry	"Gallantry in action."
—	George Deary	Army	Sergeant	Apache Creek, Arizona Territory	Apr 2, 1874	Company L, 5th US Cavalry	"Gallantry in action."
—	Frederick Deetline	Army	Blacksmith	Little Big Horn, Montana Territory	Jun 25, 1876	Company D, 7th US Cavalry	Voluntarily brought water to the wounded under fire.
	John Denny	Army	Sergeant	Las Animas Canyon, New Mexico Territory	Sep 18, 1879	Company B, 9th US Cavalry	Removed a wounded comrade, under a heavy fire, to a place of safety.
—	Charles H. Dickens	Army	Corporal	Chiricahua Mountains, Arizona Territory	Oct 20, 1869	Company G, 8th US Cavalry	"Gallantry in action."
	William Dixon	Army	Civilian Scout	Washita River, Texas	Sep 12, 1874	Civilian Scout	"Gallantry in action." Was one of fewer than ten civilians in history to receive the Medal of Honor.
	Francis S. Dodge	Army	Captain	Near White River Agency, Colorado	Sep 29, 1879	Company D, 9th US Cavalry	With a force of 40 men rode all night to the relief of a command that had been defeated and was besieged by an overwhelming force of Indians, reached the field at daylight, joined in the action and fought for 3 days.
—	John L. Donahue	Army	Private	Chiricahua Mountains, Arizona Territory	Oct 20, 1869	Company G, 8th US Cavalry	"Gallantry in action."
—	Cornelius Donavan	Army	Sergeant	Agua Fria River, Arizona Territory	Aug 25, 1869	Company E, 8th US Cavalry	"Gallantry in action."
—	John S. Donelly	Army	Private	Cedar Creek, etc., Montana Territory	Oct 1876 – Jan 1877	Company G, 5th US Infantry	"Gallantry in action"
—	James B. Doshier	Army	Civilian Post Guide	Holliday Creek, Texas; Little Wichita River	Oct 5, 1870		"Gallantry in action" and on the march.
—	William Dougherty	Army	Blacksmith	Arizona Territory	Aug 1868 – Oct 1868	Company B, 8th US Cavalry	Bravery in scouts and actions against Indians.
—	James Dowling	Army	Corporal	Arizona Territory	Aug 1868 – Oct 1868	Company B, 8th US Cavalry	Bravery in scouts and actions against Indians.

== E ==
Image	Name	Service	Rank	Place of action	Date of action	Unit	Notes
—	William D. Edwards	Army	First Sergeant	Big Hole, Montana Territory	Aug 9, 1877	Company F, 7th US Infantry	Bravery in action
—	George H. Eldridge	Army	Sergeant	Wichita River, Texas	Jul 12, 1870	Company C, 6th US Cavalry	"Gallantry in action."
	Elsatsoosu	Army	Corporal	Arizona Territory	Winter of 1872–73	Indian Scouts	Gallant conduct during campaigns and engagements with Apaches.
—	Edwin L. Elwood	Army	Private	Chiricahua Mountains, Arizona Territory	Oct 20, 1869	Company G, 8th US Cavalry	"Gallantry in action."
	Robert T. Emmet	Army	Second Lieutenant	Las Animas Canyon, New Mexico Territory	Sep 18, 1879	Troop G, 9th US Cavalry	Lt. Emmet was in G Troop which was sent to relieve a detachment of soldiers under attack by hostile Apaches During a flank attack on the Indian camp, made to divert the hostiles Lt. Emmet and 5 of his men became surrounded when the Indians returned to defend their camp. Finding that the Indians were making for a position from which they could direct their fire on the retreating troop, the Lieutenant held his point with his party until the soldiers reached the safety of a canyon. Lt. Emmet then continued to hold his position while his party recovered their horses. The enemy force consisted of approximately 200.
	William Evans	Army	Private	Big Horn, Montana Territory	Jul 9, 1876	Company E, 7th US Infantry	Carried dispatches to Brig. Gen. Crook through a country occupied by Sioux.

== F ==
Image	Name	Service	Rank	Place of action	Date of action	Unit	Notes
	Pompey Factor	Army	Private	Pecos River, Texas	Apr 25, 1875	Indian Scouts	With 3 other men, he participated in a charge against 25 hostiles while on a scouting patrol.
—	Henry Falcott	Army	Sergeant	Arizona Territory	Aug 1868 – Oct 1868	Company L, 8th U.S. Cavalry	Bravery in scouts and actions against Indians.
—	Daniel Farren	Army	Private	Arizona Territory	Aug 1868 – Oct 1868	Company B, 8th U.S. Cavalry	Bravery in scouts and actions against Indians.
—	Mosheim Feaster	Army	Private	Wounded Knee Creek, South Dakota	Dec 29, 1890	Company E, 7th U.S. Cavalry	For extraordinary gallantry, advancing to an exposed position and holding it, in action against hostile Sioux Indians, at Wounded Knee Creek, South Dakota.
	James Fegan	Army	Sergeant	Plum Creek, Kansas	Mar 1868	Company H, 3d U.S. Infantry	While in charge of a powder train en route from Fort Harker to Fort Dodge, Kans., was attacked by a party of desperadoes, who attempted to rescue a deserter in his charge and to fire the train. Sgt. Fegan, singlehanded, repelled the attacking party, wounding 2 of them, and brought his train through in safety.
—	George Ferrari	Army	Corporal	Red Creek, Arizona Territory	Sep 23, 1869	Company D, 8th U.S. Cavalry	"Gallantry in action."
—	Hermann Fichter	Army	Private	Whetstone Mountains, Arizona Territory	May 5, 1871	Company F, 3d U.S. Cavalry	"Gallantry in action."
—	John H. Foley	Army	Sergeant	Loupe Fork, Platte River, Nebraska	Apr 26, 1872	Company B, 3d U.S. Cavalry	"Gallantry in action."
—	William H. Folly	Army	Private	Arizona Territory	Aug 1868 – Oct 1868	Company B, 8th U.S. Cavalry	Bravery in scouts and actions against Indians.
—	Nicholas Foran	Army	Private	Arizona Territory	Aug 1868 – Oct 1868	Company L, 8th U.S. Cavalry	Bravery in scouts and actions against Indians.
—	Thomas H. Forsyth	Army	First Sergeant	Powder River, Wyoming Territory	Nov 25, 1876	Company M, 4th U.S. Cavalry	Though dangerously wounded, he maintained his ground with a small party against a largely superior force after his commanding officer had been shot down during a sudden attack and rescued that officer and a comrade from the enemy.
—	William Foster	Army	Sergeant	Red River, Texas	Sep 29, 1872	Company F, 4th U.S. Cavalry	"Gallantry in action."
—	Christopher Freemeyer	Army	Private	Cedar Creek, etc., Montana Territory	Oct 21, 1876 – Jan 8, 1877	Company D, 5th U.S. Infantry	"Gallantry in action."

== G ==
This along with the †, indicates that the Medal of Honor was awarded posthumously

Image	Name	Service	Rank	Place of action	Date of action	Unit	Notes
—	Peter W. Gardiner	Army	Private	Sappa Creek, Kansas	Apr 23, 1875	Company H, 6th US Cavalry	With 5 other men he waded in mud and water up the creek to a position directly behind an entrenched Cheyenne position, who were using natural bank pits to good advantage against the main column. This surprise attack from the enemy rear broke their resistance.
—	Harry Garland	Army	Corporal	Little Muddy Creek, Mont. and Camas Meadows, Idaho Territory	May 7, 1877 and Aug 29, 1877	Company L, 2nd US Cavalry	"Gallantry in action" with hostile Sioux, at Little Muddy Creek, Mont.; having been wounded in the hip so as to be unable to stand, at Camas Meadows, Idaho, he still continued to direct the men under his charge until the enemy withdrew.
	Ernest A. Garlington	Army	First Lieutenant	Wounded Knee Creek, South Dakota	Dec 29, 1890	7th U.S. Cavalry	For the admirable manner in which he managed the portion of his troop (A) under his charge, and the fighting qualities displayed by him in the performance of this duties during the action against hostile Sioux Indians, at the crossing of Wounded Knee Creek, South Dakota, where he was severely wounded.
—	George Gates	Army	Bugler	Picacho Mountain, Arizona Territory	Jun 4, 1869	Company F, 8th US Cavalry	Killed an Indian warrior and captured his arms.
—	Thomas H. Gay	Army	Private	Arizona Territory	Aug 1868 – Oct 1868	Company B, 8th US Cavalry	Bravery in scouts and actions against Indians.
—	George Geiger	Army	Sergeant	Little Big Horn River, Montana Territory	Jun 25, 1876	Company H, 7th United States Cavalry	With 3 comrades during the entire engagement courageously held a position that secured water for the command.
—	John Georgian	Army	Private	Chiricahua Mountains, Arizona Territory	Oct 20, 1869	Company G, 8th US Cavalry	Bravery in action.
—	Frederick W. Gerber	Army	Sergeant Major	Army	1839–71	U.S. Engineers	Distinguished gallantry in many actions and in recognition of long, faithful, and meritorious services covering a period of 32 years.
—	John J. Given †	Army	Corporal	Wichita River, Texas	Jul 12, 1870	Company K, 6th US Cavalry	Bravery in action.
—	Albert Glawinski	Army	Blacksmith	Powder River, Montana Territory	Mar 17, 1876	Company M, 3rd US Cavalry	During a retreat he selected exposed positions, he was part of the rear guard.
	Thaddeus B. Glover	Army	Sergeant	Mizpah Creek, Mont. and Pumpkin Creek, Montana Territory	Apr 10, 1879 and Feb 10, 1880	Company B, 2nd US Cavalry	While in charge of small scouting parties, fought, charged, surrounded, and captured war parties of Sioux Indians.
—	Michael Glynn	Army	Private	Whetstone Mountains, Arizona Territory	Jul 13, 1872	Company F, 5th US Cavalry	Drove off, singlehanded, 8 hostile Indians, killing and wounding 5.
	Edward S. Godfrey	Army	Captain	Bear Paw Mountain, Montana Territory	Sep 30, 1877	7th US Cavalry	Led his command into action when he was severely wounded.
—	Patrick Golden	Army	Sergeant	Arizona Territory	Aug 1868 – Oct 1868	Company B, 8th US Cavalry	Bravery in scouts and actions against Indians.
	Theodore W. Goldin	Army	Private	Little Big Horn, Montana Territory	Jun 26, 1876	Company G, 7th US Cavalry	One of a party of volunteers who, under a heavy fire from the Indians, went for and brought water to the wounded .
—	David Goodman	Army	Private	Lyry Creek, Arizona Territory	Oct 14, 1869	Company L, 8th US Cavalry	Bravery in action.
—	George Grant	Army	Sergeant	Fort Phil Kearny to Fort C. F. Smith, Dakota Territory	Feb 1867	Company E, 18th U.S. Infantry	Bravery, energy, and perseverance, involving much suffering and privation through attacks by hostile Indians, deep snows, etc., while voluntarily carrying dispatches.
—	Clinton Greaves	Army	Corporal	Florida Mountains, New Mexico Territory	Jan 24, 1877	Company C, 9th US Cavalry	While part of a small detachment to persuade a band of renegade Apache Indians to surrender, his group was surrounded. Cpl. Greaves in the center of the savage hand-to-hand fighting, managed to shoot and bash a gap through the swarming Apaches, permitting his companions to break free .
—	Francis C. Green	Army	Sergeant	Arizona Territory	1868–69	Company K, 8th US Cavalry	Bravery in action.
John Green	John Green	Army	Major	First Battle of the Stronghold	Jan 17, 1873	1st US Cavalry	In order to reassure his command, this officer, in the most fearless manner and exposed to very great danger, walked in front of the line; the command, thus encouraged, advanced over the lava upon the Indians who were concealed among the rocks.
	John C. Gresham	Army	First Lieutenant	Wounded Knee Creek, South Dakota	Dec 29, 1890	7th US Cavalry	Voluntarily led a party into a ravine to dislodge Sioux Indians concealed therein. He was wounded during this action.
—	Edward P. Grimes	Army	Sergeant	Milk River, Colo.	Sep 29, 1879 – Oct 5, 1879	Company F, 5th US Cavalry	The command being almost out of ammunition and surrounded on 3 sides by the enemy, he voluntarily brought up a supply under heavy flre at almost point blank range.
—	Jacob Gunther	Army	Corporal	Arizona Territory	1868–69	Company E, 8th US Cavalry	Bravery in scouts and actions against Indians.

== H ==
This along with the †, indicates that the Medal of Honor was awarded posthumously

Image	Name	Service	Rank	Place of action	Date of action	Unit	Notes
—	John Haddoo	Army	Corporal	Cedar Creek, etc., Montana Territory	Oct 1876 – Jan 8, 1877	Company B, 5th U.S. Infantry	"Gallantry in action."
—	John Hall	Army	Private	Arizona Territory	Aug 1868 – Oct 1868	Company B, 8th U.S. Cavalry	Bravery in scouts and actions against Indians
	William P. Hall	Army	First Lieutenant	Near Camp on White River, Colo.	Oct 20, 1879	5th U.S. Cavalry	With a reconnoitering party of 3 men, was attacked by 35 Indians and several times exposed himself to draw the fire of the enemy, giving his small party opportunity to reply with much effect.
—	Frank Hamilton	Army	Private	Agua Fria River, Arizona Territory	Aug 25, 1869	Company E, 8th U.S. Cavalry	Gallantry in action.
—	Mathew H. Hamilton	Army	Private	Wounded Knee Creek, South Dakota	Dec 29, 1890	Company G, 7th U.S. Cavalry	For conspicuous bravery in action against hostile Sioux Indians, at Wounded Knee Creek, South Dakota, on the 29th, and for coolness and bravery in action near the Catholic Mission, on White Clay Creek, South Dakota, on the 30th.
	Richard P. Hanley	Army	Sergeant	Little Big Horn River, Montana Territory	Jun 25, 1876	Company C, 7th U.S. Cavalry	Recaptured, singlehanded, and without orders, within the enemy's lines and under a galling fire lasting some 20 minutes, a stampeded pack mule loaded with ammunition.
—	Mosher A. Harding	Army	Blacksmith	Chiricahua Mountains, Arizona Territory	Oct 20, 1869	Company G, 8th US Cavalry	Gallantry in action.
	John Harrington	Army	Private	Washita River, Texas	Sep 12, 1874	Company H, 6th US Cavalry	While carrying dispatches was attacked by 125 hostile Indians, whom he and his comrades fought throughout the day. He was severely wounded in the hip and unable to move. He continued to fight, defending an exposed dying man. All four cavalry troopers and two civilian scouts in Zachariah T. Woodall's courier detail were awarded the Medal of Honor for this hours-long battle along the Washita River (some texts say Wichita River, a more southernly tributary of the same Red River of the South watershed).
—	Charles D. Harris	Army	Sergeant	Red Creek, Arizona Territory	Sep 23, 1869	Company D, 8th US Cavalry	Gallantry in action.
—	David W. Harris	Army	Private	Little Big Horn River, Montana Territory	Jun 25, 1876	Company A, 7th US Cavalry	Brought water to the wounded, at great danger to his life, under a most galling fire from the enemy.
—	William M. Harris	Army	Private	Little Big Horn River, Montana Territory	Jun 25, 1876	Company D, 7th US Cavalry	Voluntarily brought water to the wounded under fire of the enemy.
—	Joshija B. Hartzog	Army	Private	Wounded Knee Creek, South Dakota	Dec 29, 1890	Company E, 1st US Artillery	For bravery in action against hostile Sioux Indians, at Wounded Knee Creek, South Dakota.
—	Paul Haupt	Army	Corporal	Hell Canyon, Arizona Territory	Jul 3, 1869	Company L, 8th US Cavalry	Gallantry in action.
—	Harry L. Hawthorne	Army	Second Lieutenant	Wounded Knee Creek, South Dakota	Dec 29, 1890	2nd U.S. Artillery	For the gallantry, coolness, discretion, and effect with which he handled and served his guns in action against hostile Sioux Indians, on Wounded Knee Creek, South Dakota, where he was severely wounded.
—	Fred S. Hay	Army	Sergeant	Upper Washita, Texas	Sep 9, 1874	Company I, 5th US Infantry	Gallantry in action.
—	Richard Heartery	Army	Private	Cibicu, Arizona Territory	Aug 30, 1881	Company D, 6th US Cavalry	Bravery in action.
—	Clamor Heise	Army	Private	Arizona Territory	Aug 1868 – Oct 1868	Company B, 8th US Cavalry	Bravery in scouts and actions against Indians.
—	Leander Herron	Army	Corporal	Near Fort Dodge, Kansas	Sep 2, 1868	Company A, 3rd US Infantry	While detailed as mail courier from the fort, voluntarily went to the assistance of a party of 4 enlisted men, who were attacked by about 50 Indians at some distance from the fort and remained with them until the party was relieved.
—	Charles H. Heyl	Army	Second Lieutenant	Near Fort Hartsuff, Nebraska	Apr 28, 1876	23rd US Infantry	Voluntarily, and with most conspicuous gallantry, charged with 3 men upon 6 Indians who were entrenched upon a hillside.
—	Thomas P. Higgins	Army	Private	Arizona Territory	Aug 1868 – Oct 1868	Company B, 8th US Cavalry	Bravery in scouts and actions against Indians.
—	Frank E. Hill	Army	Sergeant	Date Creek, Arizona Territory	Sep 8, 1872	Company E, 5th US Cavalry	Secured the person of a hostile Apache Chief, although while holding the chief he was severely wounded in the back by another Indian
—	James M. Hill	Army	First Sergeant	Turret Mountain, Arizona Territory	Mar 25, 1873	Company A, 5th US Cavalry	Gallantry in action.
—	Marvin C. Hillock	Army	Private	White Clay Creek, South Dakota	Dec 30, 1890	Company B, 7th US Cavalry	For distinguished bravery in action against hostile Sioux Indians, near the Catholic Mission, on White Clay Creek, South Dakota, continuing on duty though painfully wounded.
—	Michael Himmelsback	Army	Private	Little Blue, Nebraska	May 15, 1870	Company C, 2nd US Cavalry	Gallantry in action.
—	Lehmann Hinemann	Army	Sergeant	Army	Winter of 1872–73	Company L, 1st US Cavalry	Gallant conduct during campaigns and engagements with Apaches.
—	George Hobday	Army	Private	Wounded Knee Creek, South Dakota	Dec 29, 1890	Company A, 7th US Cavalry	Conspicuous and gallant conduct in battle.
—	Henry Hogan	Army	First Sergeant	Cedar Creek, etc., Montana Territory	Oct 1876 – Jan 8, 1877	Company G, 5th U.S. Infantry	(1st award) Gallantry in actions.
—	Henry Hogan	Army	First Sergeant	Bear Paw Mountain, Montana Territory	Sep 30, 1877	Company G, 5th U.S. Infantry	(2nd award) Carried Lt. Henry Romeyn, who was severely wounded, off the field of battle under heavy fire.
—	Henry Holden	Army	Private	Battle of the Little Bighorn	June 25, 1876	Company D, 7th U.S. Cavalry	Brought up ammunition under a galling fire from the enemy.
—	David Holland	Army	Corporal	Cedar Creek, etc., Montana Territory	Oct 1876 – Jan 8, 1877	Company A, 5th US Infantry	Gallantry in actions
—	George Hooker †	Army	Private	Tonto Creek, Arizona Territory	Jan 22, 1873	Company K, 5th US Cavalry	Gallantry in action in which he was killed.
—	Samuel Hoover	Army	Bugler	Santa Maria Mountains, Arizona Territory	May 6, 1873	Company A, 1st Cavalry	Gallantry in action, also services as trailer in May 1872.
—	Simpson Hornaday	Army	Private	Sappa Creek, Kansas	Apr 23, 1875	Company H, 6th Cavalry	With 5 other men he waded in mud and water up the creek to a position directly behind an entrenched Cheyenne position, who were using natural bank pits to good advantage against the main column . This surprise attack from the enemy rear broke their resistance
	Robert Lee Howze	Army	Second Lieutenant	White River, South Dakota	Jan 1, 1891	6th Cavalry Regiment (United States)	Bravery in action.
—	Thomas Hubbard	Army	Private	Little Blue, Nebraska	May 15, 1870	Company C, 2nd US Cavalry	Gallantry in action.
—	James W. Huff	Army	Private	Army	Winter of 1872–73	Company L, 1st US Cavalry	Gallant conduct during campaigns and engagements with Apaches.
	Eli L. Huggins	Army	Captain	O'Fallons Creek, Montana Territory	Apr 1, 1880	2nd US Cavalry	Surprised the Indians in their strong position and fought them until dark with great boldness.
	Charles F. Humphrey, Sr.	Army	First Lieutenant	Clearwater, Idaho Territory	Jul 11, 1877	4th US Artillery	Led a party through withering fire and recovered an abandoned howitzer and 2 Gatling guns lying between the lines a few yards from the Indians
—	Fred O. Hunt	Army	Private	Cedar Creek, etc., Montana Territory	Oct 1876 – Jan 8, 1877	Company A, 5th Infantry	Gallantry in actions.
—	Rufus D. Hutchinson	Army	Sergeant	Little Big Horn River, Montana Territory	Jun 25, 1876	Company B, 7th US Cavalry	Guarded and carried the wounded, brought water for the same, and posted and directed the men in his charge under galling fire from the enemy.
—	Henry J. Hyde	Army	Sergeant	Army	Winter of 1872–73	Company M, 1st US Cavalry	Gallant conduct during campaigns and engagements with Apaches.

== I ==
Image	Name	Service	Rank	Place of action	Date of action	Unit	Notes
	Bernard J. D. Irwin	Army	Assistant Surgeon	Apache Pass, Arizona Territory	Feb 13, 1861 – Feb 14, 1861		For rescuing 60 soldiers trapped by Cochise

== J ==
Image	Name	Service	Rank	Place of action	Date of action	Unit	Notes
	James Jackson	Army	Captain	Camas Meadows, Idaho Territory	Aug 20, 1877	1st U.S. Cavalry	Dismounted from his horse in the face of a heavy fire from pursuing Indians, and with the assistance of 1 or 2 of the men of his command secured to a place of safety the body of his trumpeter, who had been shot
—	John James	Army	Corporal	Upper Washita, Texas	Sep 9, 1874 – Sep 11, 1874	5th U.S. Infantry	Gallantry in action.
—	Frederick Jarvis	Army	Sergeant	Chiricahua Mountains, Arizona Territory	Oct 20, 1869	Company G, 1st U.S. Cavalry	Gallantry in action.
—	Bernhard Jetter	Army	Sergeant	Sioux campaign	Dec 1890	Company K, 7th U.S. Cavalry	For distinguished bravery in action against hostile Sioux Indians, at Wounded Knee Creek, South Dakota, on the 29th, and for special gallantry in action, near the Catholic Mission, on White Clay Creek, South Dakota, on the 30th.
—	Jim	Army	Sergeant	Army	Winter of 1871–73	Indian Scouts	Gallant conduct during campaigns and engagements with Apaches.
	Henry Johnson	Army	Sergeant	Milk River, Colo.	Oct 2, 1879 – Oct 5, 1879	Company D, 9th U.S. Cavalry	Buffalo Soldier. Voluntarily left fortified shelter and under heavy fire at close range made the rounds of the pits to instruct the guards, fought his way to the creek and back to bring water to the wounded.
—	Edward Johnston	Army	Corporal	Cedar Creek, etc., Montana Territory	Oct 1876 – Jan 8, 1877	Company C, 5th U.S. Infantry	Gallantry in action.
—	William H. Jones	Army	Farrier	Little Muddy Creek, Mont. and Camas Meadows, Idaho Territory	May 7, 1877 and Aug 20, 1877	Company L, 2nd U.S. Cavalry	Gallantry in the attack against hostile Sioux Indians on May 7, 1877 at Muddy Creek, Mont., and in the engagement with Nez Perces Indians at Camas Meadows, Idaho, on 20 August 1877 in which he sustained a painful knee wound.
	George Jordan	Army	Sergeant	Fort Tularosa, N. Mex. and Carrizo Canyon, New Mexico Territory	May 14, 1880 and Aug 12, 1881	Company K, 9th U.S. Cavalry	While commanding a detachment of 25 men at Fort Tularosa, N. Mex., repulsed a force of more than 100 Indians. At Carrizo Canyon, N . Mex., while commanding the right of a detachment of 19 men, on 12 August 1881, he stubbornly held his ground in an extremely exposed position and gallantly forced back a much superior number of the enemy, preventing them from surrounding the command.

== K ==
This along with the †, indicates that the Medal of Honor was awarded posthumously

Image	Name	Service	Rank	Place of action	Date of action	Unit	Notes
—	John Kay	Army	Private	Arizona Territory	Oct 21, 1868	Company L, 8th U.S. Cavalry	Brought a comrade, severely wounded, from under the fire of a large party of the enemy.
—	Daniel Keating	Army	Corporal	Wichita River, Texas	Oct 5, 1870	Company M, 6th U.S. Cavalry	"Gallantry in action" and in pursuit of Indians.
—	Bartholomew T. Keenan	Army	Trumpeter	Chiricahua Mountains, Arizona Territory	Oct 20, 1869	Company G, 1st U.S. Cavalry	"Gallantry in action."
—	John Keenan	Army	Private	Arizona Territory	Aug 1868 – Oct 1868	Company B, 8th U.S. Cavalry	Bravery in scouts and actions against Indians.
—	Charles Kelley	Army	Private	Chiricahua Mountains, Arizona Territory	Oct 20, 1869	Company G, 1st U.S. Cavalry	"Gallantry in action."
—	John J. H. Kelly	Army	Corporal	Upper Washita, Texas	Sep 9, 1874	Company I, 5th U.S. Infantry	"Gallantry in action."
—	Thomas Kelly	Army	Private	Upper Washita, Texas	Sep 9, 1874	Company I, 5th U.S. Infantry	"Gallantry in action." Interred in Mount Calvary Cemetery, Lansing Kansas
—	Kelsay	Army	Indian Scout	Unknown	Winter of 1872–73	Indian Scouts	Gallant conduct during campaigns and engagements with Apaches.
—	Philip Kennedy	Army	Private	Cedar Creek, etc., Montana Territory	Oct 21, 1876 – Jan 8, 1877	Company C, 5th U.S. Infantry	"Gallantry in action."
—	John Brown Kerr	Army	Captain	White River, South Dakota	Jan 1, 1891	6th U.S. Cavalry	For distinguished bravery while in command of his troop in action against hostile Sioux Indians on the north bank of the White River, near the mouth of Little Grass Creek, S. Dak., where he defeated a force of 300 Brule Sioux warriors, and turned the Sioux tribe, which was endeavoring to enter the Bad Lands, back into the Pine Ridge Agency.
—	Thomas Kerrigan	Army	Sergeant	Wichita River, Texas	Jul 12, 1870	Company H, 6th U.S. Cavalry	"Gallantry in action."
—	John Kilmartin	Army	Private	Whetstone Mountains, Arizona Territory	May 5, 1871	Company F, 3rd U.S. Cavalry	"Gallantry in action."
—	John Kirk	Army	First Sergeant	Wichita River, Texas	Jul 12, 1870	Company L, 6th U.S. Cavalry	"Gallantry in action."
—	John A. Kirkwood	Army	Sergeant	Slim Buttes, Dakota Territory	Sep 9, 1876	Company M, 3rd U.S. Cavalry	Bravely endeavored to dislodge some Sioux Indians secreted in a ravine.
	George K. Kitchen	Army	Sergeant	Upper Washita, Texas	Sep 9, 1874	Company H, 6th U.S. Cavalry	"Gallantry in action."
	Albert Knaak	Army	Sergeant	Arizona Territory	Aug 1868 – Oct 1868	Company B, 8th U.S. Cavalry	Bravery in scouts and actions against Indians.
—	Joseph F. Knight	Army	Sergeant	White River, South Dakota	Jan 1, 1891	Troop F, 6th U.S. Cavalry	Led the advance in a spirited movement to the assistance of Troop K, 6th U.S. Cavalry.
—	John W. Knox	Army	Sergeant	Upper Washita, Texas	Sep 9, 1874	Company I, 5th U.S. Infantry	"Gallantry in action."
—	William Koelpin	Army	Sergeant	Upper Washita, Texas	Sep 9, 1874	Company I, 5th U.S. Infantry	"Gallantry in action."
—	Kosoha	Army	Indian Scout	Army	Winter of 1872–73	Indian Scouts	Gallant conduct during campaigns and engagements with Apaches.
—	Wendelin Kreher †	Army	First Sergeant	Cedar Creek, etc., Montana Territory	Oct 21, 1876 – Jan 8, 1877	Company C, 5th U.S. Infantry	"Gallantry in action."
—	John Kyle	Army	Corporal	Near Republican River, Kansas	Jul 8, 1869	Company M, 5th U.S. Cavalry	This soldier and 2 others were attacked by 8 Indians, but beat them off and badly wounded 2 of them.

== L ==
Image	Name	Service	Rank	Place of action	Date of action	Unit	Notes
David Larkin	David Larkin	Army	Farrier	Red River, Texas	Sep 29, 1872	Company F, 4th U.S. Cavalry	"Gallantry in action."
—	James Lawrence	Army	Private	Arizona Territory	Aug 1868 – Oct 1868	Company B, 8th U.S. Cavalry	Bravery in scouts and actions against Indians.
	John S. Lawton	Army	Sergeant	Milk River, Colorado	Sep 29, 1879	Company D, 5th U.S. Cavalry	Coolness and steadiness under fire; volunteered to accompany a small detachment on a very dangerous mission.
—	James Lenihan	Army	Private	Clear Creek, Arizona Territory	Jan 2, 1873	Company K, 5th U.S. Cavalry	"Gallantry in action."
—	Patrick J. Leonard	Army	Sergeant	Little Blue, Nebraska	May 15, 1870	Company C, 2nd U.S. Cavalry	"Gallantry in action."
—	Patrick T. Leonard	Army	Corporal	Near Fort Hartsuff, Nebraska	Apr 28, 1876	Company A, 23d U.S. Infantry	Gallantry in charge on hostile Sioux.
—	William Leonard	Army	Private	Muddy Creek, Montana Territory	May 7, 1877	Company L, 2nd U.S. Cavalry	Bravery in action.
	William B. Lewis	Army	Sergeant	Bluff Station, Wyoming Territory	Jan 20, 1877 – Jan 22, 1877	Company B, 3rd US Cavalry	Bravery in skirmish.
—	Thomas Little	Army	Bugler	Arizona Territory	Aug 1868 – Oct 1868	Company B, 8th US Cavalry	Bravery in scouts and actions against Indians.
—	Francis W. Lohnes	Army	Private	Gilmans Ranch, Nebraska Territory	May 12, 1865	Company H, 1st Nebraska Veterans Cavalry	Gallantry in defending Government property against Indians.
	Oscar F. Long	Army	Second Lieutenant	Bear Paw Mountain, Montana Territory	Sep 30, 1877	5th U.S. Infantry	Having been directed to order a troop of cavalry to advance, and finding both its officers killed, he voluntarily assumed command, and under a heavy fire from the Indians advanced the troop to its proper position.
—	James Lowthers	Army	Private	Sappa Creek, Kansas	Apr 23, 1875	Company H, 6th US Cavalry	With 5 other men he waded in mud and water up the creek to a position directly behind an entrenched Cheyenne position, who were using natural bank pits to good advantage against the main column. This surprise attack from the enemy rear broke their resistance.
—	George Loyd	Army	Sergeant	Wounded Knee Creek, South Dakota	Dec 29, 1890	Company I, 7th US Cavalry	For courage, zeal, and attention to duty in action against hostile Sioux Indians, at Wounded Knee Creek, South Dakota, especially after having been severely wounded through the lung.
—	Leonidas S. Lytle	Army	Sergeant	Near Fort Selden, New Mexico Territory	Jul 8, 1873 – Jul 11, 1873	Company C, 8th US Cavalry	Services against hostile Indians.
—	Jeptha L. Lytton	Army	Corporal	Near Fort Hartsuff, Nebraska	Apr 28, 1876	Company A, 23rd US Infantry	Gallantry in charge on hostile Sioux.

== M ==
This along with the †, indicates that the Medal of Honor was awarded posthumously

Image	Name	Service	Rank	Place of action	Date of action	Unit	Notes
—	Machol	Army	Private	Arizona Territory	1872–73	Indian Scouts	Gallant conduct during campaign and engagements with Apaches.
—	Herbert Mahers	Army	Private	Seneca Mountain, Arizona Territory	Aug 25, 1869	Company F, 8th U.S. Cavalry	"Gallantry in action."
	Gregory Mahoney	Army	Private	Near Red River, Texas	Sep 26, 1874 – Sep 28, 1874	Company E, 4th U.S. Cavalry	Gallantry in attack on a large party of Cheyennes.
—	Patrick Martin	Army	Sergeant	Castle Dome and Santa Maria Mountains, Arizona Territory	Jun 1873 – Jul 1873	Company G, 5th U.S. Cavalry	Gallant services in operations of Capt. James Burns, 5th U.S. Cavalry.
—	David A. Matthews	Army	Corporal	Arizona Territory	1868–69	Company E, 8th U.S. Cavalry	Bravery in scouts and actions against Indians.
	Marion P. Maus	Army	First Lieutenant	Sierra Madre Mountains, Mexico	Jan 11, 1886	1st U.S. Infantry	Most distinguished gallantry in action with hostile Apaches led by Geronimo and Natchez.
—	John May	Army	Sergeant	Wichita River, Texas	Jul 12, 1870	Company L, 6th U.S. Cavalry	"Gallantry in action."
	Isaiah Mays	Army	Corporal	Arizona Territory	May 11, 1889	Company B, 24th U.S. Infantry	Gallantry in the fight between Paymaster Wham's escort and robbers. Mays walked and crawled 2 miles to a ranch for help.
—	Bernard McBride	Army	Private	Arizona Territory	Aug 1868 – Oct 1868	Company B, 8th U.S. Cavalry	Bravery in scouts and actions against Indians.
	William McBryar	Army	Sergeant	Arizona Territory	Mar 7, 1890	Company K, 10th U.S. Cavalry	Distinguished himself for coolness, bravery and marksmanship while his troop was in pursuit of hostile Apache Indians.
—	William McCabe	Army	Private	Near Red River, Texas	Sep 26, 1874 – Sep 28, 1874	Company E, 4th U.S. Cavalry	Gallantry in attack on a large party of Cheyennes.
—	Bernard McCann †	Army	Private	Cedar Creek, etc., Montana Territory	Oct 21, 1876 – Jan 8, 1877	Company F, 22d U.S. Infantry	"Gallantry in action."
Michael McCarthy	Michael M. McCarthy	Army	First Sergeant	White Bird Canyon, Idaho Territory	Jun 1876 – Jan 1877	Troop H, 1st U.S. Cavalry	Was detailed with 6 men to hold a commanding position, and held it with great gallantry until the troops fell back. He then fought his way through the Indians, rejoined a portion of his command, and continued the fight in retreat. He had 2 horses shot from under him, and was captured, but escaped and reported for duty after 3 days' hiding and wandering in the mountains.
	Edward J. McClernand	Army	Second Lieutenant	Bear Paw Mountain, Montana Territory	Sep 30, 1877	2d U.S. Cavalry	Gallantly attacked a band of hostiles and conducted the combat with excellent skill and boldness.
—	Michael McCormick	Army	Private	Cedar Creek, etc., Montana Territory	Oct 21, 1876 – Jan 8, 1877	Company G, 5th U.S. Infantry	"Gallantry in action" .
—	Franklin M. McDonald	Army	Private	Near Fort Griffin, Texas	Aug 5, 1872	Company G, 11th U.S. Infantry	Gallantry in defeating Indians who attacked the mail.
—	James McDonald	Army	Corporal	Arizona Territory	Aug 1868 – Oct 1868	Company B, 8th U.S. Cavalry	Bravery in scouts and actions against Indians.
—	Robert McDonald	Army	First Lieutenant	Wolf Mountain, Montana Territory	Jan 8, 1877	5th U.S. Infantry	Led his command in a successful charge against superior numbers of hostile Indians, strongly posted.
—	Michael A. McGann	Army	First Sergeant	Rosebud River, Montana Territory	Jun 17, 1876	Company F, 3rd U.S. Cavalry	"Gallantry in action."
—	Owen McGar	Army	Private	Cedar Creek, etc., Montana Territory	Oct 21, 1876 – Jan 8, 1877	Company C, 5th U.S. Infantry	"Gallantry in action."
—	John McHugh	Army	Private	Cedar Creek, etc., Montana Territory	Oct 21, 1876 – Jan 8, 1877	Company A, 5th U.S. Infantry	"Gallantry in action"
—	Daniel McKinley	Army	Private	Arizona Territory	Aug 1868 – Oct 1868	Company B, 8th U.S. Cavalry	Bravery in scouts and actions against Indians.
—	John McLennon	Army	Musician	Big Hole, Montana Territory	Aug 9, 1877	Company A, 7th U.S. Infantry	"Gallantry in action."
—	Michael McLoughlin	Army	Sergeant	Cedar Creek, etc., Montana Territory	Oct 21, 1876 – Jan 8, 1877	Company A, 5th U.S. Infantry	"Gallantry in action."
—	Henry A. McMasters †	Army	Corporal	Red River, Texas	Sep 29, 1872	Company A, 4th US Cavalry	"Gallantry in action."
—	Albert W. McMillan	Army	Sergeant	Wounded Knee Creek, South Dakota	Dec 29, 1890	Company E, 7th US Cavalry	While engaged with Indians concealed in a ravine, he assisted the men on the skirmish line, directed their fire, encouraged them by example, and used every effort to dislodge the enemy.
—	James McNally	Army	First Sergeant	Arizona Territory	1868–69	Company E, 8th US Cavalry	Bravery in scouts and actions against Indians.
—	William McNamara	Army	First Sergeant	Red River, Texas	Sep 29, 1872	Company F, 4th US Cavalry	"Gallantry in action."
—	Robert McPhelan	Army	Sergeant	Cedar Creek, etc., Montana Territory	Oct 21, 1876 – Jan 8, 1877	Company E, 5th US Infantry	"For gallantry in charging with three Privates and driving from hills a larger number of Indians, and for Meritorious Conduct in the performance of his duty as a File Closer in the execution of which he was severely wounded." Interred in Leavenworth National Cemetery, Leavenworth Kansas
—	Charles H. McVeagh	Army	Private	Arizona Territory	Aug 1868 – Oct 1868	Company B, 8th US Cavalry	Bravery in scouts and actions against Indians.
—	Nicholas Meaher	Army	Corporal	Chiricahua Mountains, Arizona Territory	Oct 20, 1869	Company G, 1st US Cavalry	"Gallantry in action."
—	Henry W. B. Mechlin	Army	Blacksmith	Little Big Horn, Montana Territory	Jun 25, 1876	Company H, 7th US Cavalry	With 3 comrades during the entire engagement courageously held a position that secured water for the command.
—	John Merrill	Army	Sergeant	Milk River, Colorado	Sep 29, 1879	Company F, 5th US Cavalry	Though painfully wounded, he remained on duty and rendered gallant and valuable service.
—	Daniel H. Miller	Army	Private	Whetstone Mountains, Arizona Territory	May 5, 1871	Company F, 3rd US Cavalry	"Gallantry in action."
—	George Miller	Army	Corporal	Cedar Creek, etc., Montana Territory	Oct 21, 1876 – Jan 8, 1877	Company H, 5th US Infantry	"Gallantry in action."
—	George W. Miller	Army	Private	Arizona Territory	Aug 1868 – Oct 1868	Company B, 8th US Cavalry	Bravery in scouts and actions against Indians.
—	John Mitchell	Army	First Sergeant	Upper Washita, Texas	Sep 9, 1874 – Sep 11, 1874	Company I, 5th US Infantry	Gallantry in engagement with Indians.
—	John J. Mitchell	Army	Corporal	Hell Canyon, Arizona Territory	Jul 3, 1869	Company L, 8th US Cavalry	"Gallantry in action."
—	Charles H. Montrose	Army	Private	Cedar Creek, etc., Montana Territory	Oct 21, 1876 – Jan 8, 1877	Company I, 5th US Infantry	"Gallantry in action."
—	George Moquin	Army	Corporal	Milk River, Colorado	Sep 29, 1879 – Oct 5, 1879	Company F, 5th US Cavalry	"Gallantry in action."
—	John Moran	Army	Private	Seneca Mountain, Arizona Territory	Aug 25, 1869	Company F, 8th U.S. Cavalry	"Gallantry in action."
	George H. Morgan	Army	Second Lieutenant	Big Dry Fork, Arizona Territory	Jul 17, 1882	3rd US Cavalry	Gallantly held his ground at a critical moment and fired upon the advancing enemy (hostile Indians) until he was disabled by a shot.
—	John Moriarity	Army	Sergeant	Arizona Territory	1868–69	Company E, 8th US Cavalry	Bravery in scouts and actions against Indians.
—	James L. Morris	Army	First Sergeant	Near Fort Selden, New Mexico Territory	Jul 8, 1873 – Jul 11, 1873	Company C, 8th US Cavalry	Services against hostile Indians.
—	William W. Morris	Army	Corporal	Upper Washita, Texas	Sep 9, 1874 – Sep 11, 1874	Company H, 6th US Cavalry	Gallantry in engagement with Indians.
—	John Mott	Army	Sergeant	Whetstone Mountains, Arizona Territory	May 5, 1871	Company F, 3rd US Cavalry	"Gallantry in action."
	Myles Moylan	Army	Captain	Bear Paw Mountain, Montana Territory	Sep 30, 1877	7th US Cavalry	Gallantly led his command in action against Nez Perce Indians until he was severely wounded.
—	Edward Murphy	Army	Private	Chiricahua Mountains, Arizona Territory	Oct 20, 1869	Company G, 1st US Cavalry	"Gallantry in action."
—	Edward F. Murphy	Army	Corporal	Milk River, Colorado	Sep 29, 1879	Company D, 5th US Cavalry	"Gallantry in action."
	Jeremiah J. Murphy	Army	Private	Powder River, Montana Territory	Mar 17, 1876	Company M, 3rd US Cavalry	Being the only member of his picket not disabled, he attempted to save a wounded comrade.
—	Philip Murphy	Army	Corporal	Seneca Mountain, Arizona Territory	Aug 25, 1869	Company F, 8th US Cavalry	"Gallantry in action."
—	Thomas Murphy	Army	Corporal	Seneca Mountain, Arizona Territory	Aug 25, 1869	Company F, 8th US Cavalry	"Gallantry in action."
—	Thomas Murray	Army	Sergeant	Little Big Horn, Montana Territory	Jun 25, 1876	Company B, 7th US Cavalry	Brought up the pack train, and on the second day the rations, under a heavy fire from the enemy.
—	Fred Myers	Army	Sergeant	White River, South Dakota	Jan 1, 1891	Company K, 6th US Cavalry	With 5 men repelled a superior force of the enemy and held his position against their repeated efforts to recapture it.

== N ==
Image	Name	Service	Rank	Place of action	Date of action	Unit	Notes
—	Nannasaddie	Army	Indian Scout	Army	1872–73	Indian Scouts	Gallant conduct during campaigns and engagements with Apaches.
—	Nantaje	Army	Indian Scout	Army	1872–73	Indian Scouts	Gallant conduct during campaigns and engagements with Apaches. Name sometimes spelled "Nantahe".
—	Solon D. Neal	Army	Private	Wichita River, Texas	Jul 12, 1870	Company L, 6th U.S. Cavalry	"Gallantry in action."
—	Adam Neder	Army	Private	Sioux campaign	Dec 1890	Company A, 7th U.S. Cavalry	Distinguished bravery.
—	Frederick S. Neilon	Army	Sergeant	Upper Washita, Texas	Sep 9, 1874 – Sep 11, 1874	Company A, 6th U.S. Cavalry	"Gallantry in action." Alias: Frank Singleton
—	Henry Newman	Army	First Sergeant	Whetstone Mountains, Arizona Territory	Jul 13, 1872	Company F, 5th U.S. Cavalry	He and 2 companions covered the withdrawal of wounded comrades from the fire of an Apache band well concealed among rocks.
John Nihill	John Nihill	Army	Private	Whetstone Mountains, Arizona Territory	Jul 13, 1872	Company F, 5th U.S. Cavalry	Fought and defeated 4 hostile Apaches located between him and his comrades.
—	Richard J. Nolan	Army	Farrier	White Clay Creek, South Dakota	Dec 30, 1890	Company I, 7th U.S. Cavalry	Bravery.

== O ==
Image	Name	Service	Rank	Place of action	Date of action	Unit	Notes
—	John O'Callaghan	Army	Sergeant	Arizona Territory	Aug 1868 – Oct 1868	Company B, 8th U.S. Cavalry	Bravery in scouts and actions against Indians.
—	Francis Oliver	Army	First Sergeant	Chiricahua Mountains, Arizona Territory	Oct 20, 1869	Company G, 1st U.S. Cavalry	Bravery in action.
—	William O'Neill	Army	Corporal	Red River, Texas	Sep 29, 1872	Company I, 4th U.S. Cavalry	Bravery in action.
—	Michael O'Regan	Army	Private	Arizona Territory	Aug 1868 – Oct 1868	Company B, 8th U.S. Cavalry	Bravery in scouts and actions against Indians.
—	Moses Orr	Army	Private	Apache Campaigns	Winter of 1872–73	Company A, 1st U.S. Cavalry	Gallant conduct during campaigns and engagements with Apaches.
—	William Osborne	Army	Sergeant	Apache Campaigns	Winter of 1872–73	Company M, 1st U.S. Cavalry	Gallant conduct during campaigns and engagements with Apaches.
—	John F. O'Sullivan	Army	Private	Staked Plains, Texas	Dec 8, 1874	Company I, 4th U.S. Cavalry	Gallantry in a long chase after Indians.

== P ==
Image	Name	Service	Rank	Place of action	Date of action	Unit	Notes
—	Adam Paine	Army	Private	Canyon Blanco tributary of the Red River, Texas	Sep 26, 1874 – Sep 27, 1874	Indian Scouts	Rendered invaluable service to Col. R. S. Mackenzie, 4th U.S. Cavalry, during this engagement.
	William R. Parnell	Army	First Lieutenant	White Bird Canyon, Idaho Territory	Jun 17, 1877	1st US Cavalry	With a few men, in the face of a heavy fire from pursuing Indians and at imminent peril, returned and rescued a soldier whose horse had been killed and who had been left behind in the retreat.
—	Isaac Payne	Army	Trumpeter	Pecos River, Texas	Apr 25, 1875	Indian Scouts	With 3 other men, he participated in a charge against 25 hostiles while on a scouting patrol.
—	Edward Pengally	Army	Private	Chiricahua Mountains, Arizona Territory	Oct 20, 1869	Company G, 8th US Cavalry	"Gallantry in action."
—	Josiah Pennsyl	Army	Sergeant	Upper Washita, Texas	Sep 11, 1874	Company M, 6th US Cavalry	"Gallantry in action."
—	Lewis Phife	Army	Sergeant	Arizona Territory	Aug 1868 – Oct 1868	Company B, 8th US Cavalry	Bravery in scouts and actions against Indians.
—	Wilhelm O. Philipsen	Army	Blacksmith	Milk River, Colo.	Sep 29, 1879	Company D, 5th US Cavalry	With 9 others voluntarily attacked and captured a strong position held by Indians.
—	Samuel D. Phillips	Army	Private	Muddy Creek, Montana Territory	May 7, 1877	Company H, 2d US Cavalry	"Gallantry in action."
—	Edwin Phoenix	Army	Corporal	Near Red River, Texas	Sep 26, 1874 – Sep 28, 1874	Company E, 4th US Cavalry	"Gallantry in action."
—	Frederick Platten	Army	Sergeant	Sappa Creek, Kansas	Apr 23, 1875	Company H, 6th US Cavalry	With 5 other men he waded in mud and water up the creek to a position directly behind an entrenched Cheyenne position, who were using natural bank pits to good advantage against the main column. This surprise attack from the enemy rear broke their resistance.
—	John A. Poppe	Army	Sergeant	Milk River, Colo.	Sep 29, 1879 – Oct 5, 1879	Company F, 5th US Cavalry	"Gallantry in action."
—	Samuel Porter	Army	Farrier	Wichita River, Texas	Jul 12, 1870	Company L, 6th US Cavalry	"Gallantry in action."
—	Thomas Powers	Army	Corporal	Chiricahua Mountains, Arizona Territory	Oct 20, 1869	Company G, 1st US Cavalry	"Gallantry in action."
—	James Pratt	Army	Blacksmith	Red River, Texas	Sep 29, 1872	Company I, 4th US Cavalry	"Gallantry in action."
—	James Pym	Army	Private	Battle of the Little Bighorn	Jun 25, 1876	Company B, 7th US Cavalry	Voluntarily went for water and secured the same under heavy fire.

== R ==
Image	Name	Service	Rank	Place of action	Date of action	Unit	Notes
—	John Raerick	Army	Private	Lyry Creek, Arizona Territory	Oct 14, 1869	Company L, 8th US Cavalry	"Gallantry in action" with Indians.
—	Theodore Ragnar	Army	First Sergeant	White Clay Creek, South Dakota	Dec 30, 1890	Company K, 7th US Cavalry	Bravery.
—	William Rankin	Army	Private	Red River, Texas	Sep 29, 1872	Company F, 4th US Cavalry	"Gallantry in action" with Indians.
—	James C. Reed	Army	Private	Arizona Territory	Apr 29, 1868	Company A, 8th US Cavalry	Defended his position (with 3 others) against a party of 17 hostile Indians under heavy fire at close quarters, the entire party except himself being severely wounded
—	Samuel Richman	Army	Private	Arizona Territory	1868–69	Company E, 8th US Cavalry	Bravery in actions with Indians.
	Hampton M. Roach	Army	Corporal	Milk River, Colo.	Sep 29, 1879 – Oct 5, 1879	Company F, 5th US Cavalry	Erected breastworks under fire; also kept the command supplied with water 3 consecutive nights while exposed to fire from ambushed Indians at close range
Marcus Robbins	Marcus M. Robbins	Army	Private	Sappa Creek, Kansas	Apr 23, 1875	Company H, 6th US Cavalry	With 5 other men he waded in mud and water up the creek to a position directly behind an entrenched Cheyenne position, who were using natural bank pits to good advantage against the main column. This surprise attack from the enemy rear broke their resistance
Joseph Robinson	Joseph Robinson	Army	First Sergeant	Rosebud River, Montana Territory	Jun 17, 1876	Company D, 3rd US Cavalry	Discharged his duties while in charge of the skirmish line under fire with judgment and great coolness and brought up the lead horses at a critical moment
David Roche	David Roche	Army	First Sergeant	Cedar Creek, etc., Montana Territory	Oct 21, 1876 – Jan 8, 1877	Company A, 5th US Infantry	"Gallantry in action."
—	Henry Rodenburg	Army	Private	Cedar Creek, etc., Montana Territory	Oct 21, 1876 – Jan 8, 1877	Company A, 5th US Infantry	"Gallantry in action."
—	Patrick Rogan	Army	Sergeant	Big Hole, Montana Territory	Aug 9, 1877	Company A, 7th US Infantry	Verified and reported the company while subjected to a galling fire from the enemy.
	Henry Romeyn	Army	First Lieutenant	Bear Paw Mountain, Montana Territory	Sep 30, 1877	5th US Infantry	Led his command into close range of the enemy, there maintained his position, and vigorously prosecuted the fight until he was severely wounded
—	Edward Rooney	Army	Private	Cedar Creek, etc., Montana Territory	Oct 21, 1876 – Jan 8, 1877	Company D, 5th US Infantry	"Gallantry in action."
—	Peter Roth	Army	Private	Washita River, Texas	Sep 12, 1874	Company A, 6th US Cavalry	While carrying dispatches was attacked by 125 hostile Indians, whom he and his comrades fought throughout the day. All four cavalry troopers and two civilian scouts in Zachariah T. Woodall's courier detail were awarded the Medal of Honor for this hours-long battle along the Washita River (some texts say Wichita River, a more southernly tributary of the same Red River of the South watershed).
—	John F. Rowalt	Army	Private	Lyry Creek, Arizona Territory	Oct 14, 1869	Company I, 8th US Cavalry	"Gallantry in action" with Indians.
—	Y. B. Rowdy	Army	Sergeant	Arizona Territory	Mar 7, 1890	Company A, Indian Scouts	Bravery in action with Apache Indians.
—	Stanislaus Roy	Army	Sergeant	Little Big Horn, Montana Territory	Jun 25, 1876	Company A, 7th US Cavalry	Brought water to the wounded at great danger to life and under a most galling fire of the enemy.
—	James Russell	Army	Private	Chiricahua Mountains, Arizona Territory	Oct 20, 1869	Company G, 1st US Cavalry	"Gallantry in action" with Indians.
—	David Ryan	Army	Private	Cedar Creek, etc., Montana Territory	Oct 21, 1876 – Jan 8, 1877	Company G, 5th US Infantry	"Gallantry in action."
—	Dennis Ryan	Army	First Sergeant	Gageby Creek, Indian Territory	Dec 2, 1874	Company I, 6th US Cavalry	Courage while in command of a detachment.

== S ==
This along with the †, indicates that the Medal of Honor was awarded posthumously

Image	Name	Service	Rank	Place of action	Date of action	Unit	Notes
—	Albert Sale	Army	Private	Santa Maria River, Arizona Territory	Jun 29, 1869	Company F, 8th US Cavalry	Gallantry in killing an Indian warrior and capturing pony and effects.
—	John Schnitzer	Army	Wagoner	Horseshoe Canyon, New Mexico Territory	Apr 23, 1882	Company G, 4th US Cavalry	Assisted, under a heavy fire, to rescue a wounded comrade.
—	Julius Schou	Army	Corporal	Sioux Campaign	1870	Company I, 22nd US Infantry	Carried dispatches to Fort Buford.
—	Charles Schroeter	Army	Private	Chiricahua Mountains, Arizona Territory	Oct 20, 1869	Company G, 8th US Cavalry	"Gallantry in action."
—	George D. Scott	Army	Private	Little Big Horn, Montana Territory	Jun 25, 1876 – Jun 26, 1876	Company D, 7th US Cavalry	Voluntarily brought water to the wounded under fire.
—	Robert B. Scott	Army	Private	Chiricahua Mountains, Arizona Territory	Oct 20, 1869	Company G, 8th US Cavalry	"Gallantry in action."
—	Griffin Seward	Army	Wagoner	Chiricahua Mountains, Arizona Territory	Oct 20, 1869	Company G, 8th US Cavalry	"Gallantry in action."
—	William Shaffer	Army	Private	Arizona Territory	Aug 1868 – Oct 1868	Company B, 8th US Cavalry	Bravery in scouts and actions against Indians.
—	Edward C. Sharpless	Army	Corporal	Upper Washita, Texas	Sep 9, 1874 – Sep 11, 1874	Company H, 6th US Cavalry	While carrying dispatches was attacked by 125 hostile Indians, whom he (and a comrade) fought throughout the day.
	Thomas Shaw	Army	Sergeant	Carrizo Canyon, New Mexico Territory	Aug 12, 1881	Company K, 9th US Cavalry	Forced the enemy back after stubbornly holding his ground in an extremely exposed position and prevented the enemy's superior numbers from surrounding his command
—	John Sheerin	Army	Blacksmith	Near Fort Selden, New Mexico Territory	Jul 8, 1873 – Jul 11, 1873	Company C, 8th US Cavalry	Services against hostile Indians.
—	Charles B. Sheppard	Army	Private	Cedar Creek, etc., Montana Territory	Oct 21, 1876 – Jan 8, 1877	Company A, 5th US Infantry	Bravery in action with Sioux.
	John H. Shingle	Army	First Sergeant	Rosebud River, Montana Territory	Jun 17, 1876	Company I, 3rd US Cavalry	"Gallantry in action." Alias: John Henry
	John O. Skinner	Army	Civilian Contract Surgeon	Lava Beds, Oregon	Jan 17, 1873		Rescued a wounded soldier who lay under a close and heavy fire during the assault on the Modoc stronghold after 2 soldiers had unsuccessfully attempted to make the rescue and both had been wounded in doing so
—	Andrew J. Smith	Army	Sergeant	Chiricahua Mountains, Arizona Territory	Oct 20, 1869	Company G, 8th US Cavalry	"Gallantry in action."
—	Charles E. Smith	Army	Corporal	Wichita River, Texas	Jul 12, 1870	Company H, 6th US Cavalry	"Gallantry in action."
	Cornelius C. Smith	Army	Corporal	Near White River, South Dakota	Jan 1, 1891	Company K, 6th US Cavalry	With 4 men of his troop drove off a superior force of the enemy and held his position against their repeated efforts to recapture it, and subsequently pursued them a great distance
—	George W. Smith †	Army	Private	Washita River, Texas	Sep 12, 1874	Company M, 6th US Cavalry	While carrying dispatches was attacked by 125 hostile Indians, whom he and his comrades fought throughout the day. Pvt. Smith was mortally wounded during the engagement and died early the next day. All four cavalry troopers and two civilian scouts in Zachariah T. Woodall's courier detail were awarded the Medal of Honor for this hours-long battle along the Washita River (some texts say Wichita River, a more southernly tributary of the same Red River of the South watershed).
—	Otto Smith	Army	Private	Arizona Territory	1868–69	Company K, 8th US Cavalry	Bravery in scouts and actions against Indians.
—	Robert Smith	Army	Private	Slim Buttes, Dakota Territory	Sep 9, 1876	Company M, 3rd US Cavalry	Special bravery in endeavoring to dislodge Indians secreted in a ravine .
—	Theodore F. Smith	Army	Private	Chiricahua Mountains, Arizona Territory	Oct 20, 1869	Company G, 1st US Cavalry	"Gallantry in action."
—	Thomas J. Smith	Army	Private	Chiricahua Mountains, Arizona Territory	Oct 20, 1869	Company G, 1st US Cavalry	"Gallantry in action."
—	William Smith	Army	Private	Chiricahua Mountains, Arizona Territory	Oct 20, 1869	Company G, 8th US Cavalry	"Gallantry in action."
—	William H. Smith	Army	Private	Chiricahua Mountains, Arizona Territory	Oct 20, 1869	Company G, 1st US Cavalry	"Gallantry in action."
—	Elmer A. Snow	Army	Trumpeter	Rosebud Creek, Montana Territory	Jun 17, 1876	Company M, 3rd US Cavalry	Bravery in action; was wounded in both arms
—	Orizoba Spence	Army	Private	Chiricahua Mountains, Arizona Territory	Oct 20, 1869	Company G, 8th US Cavalry	"Gallantry in action"
—	George Springer	Army	Private	Chiricahua Mountains, Arizona Territory	Oct 20, 1869	Company G, 1st US Cavalry	"Gallantry in action."
—	Emanuel Stance	Army	Sergeant	Kickapoo Springs, Texas	May 20, 1870	Company F, 9th US Cavalry	Gallantry on scout after Indians.
—	Eben Stanley	Army	Private	near Turret Mountain, Arizona Territory	Mar 25, 1873 and Mar 27, 1873	Company A, 5th US Cavalry	"Gallantry in action."
—	Edward Stanley	Army	Corporal	Seneca Mountain, Arizona Territory	Aug 26, 1869	Company F, 8th US Cavalry	"Gallantry in action."
—	Rudolph Stauffer	Army	First Sergeant	Near Camp Hualpai, Arizona Territory	1872	Company K, 5th US Cavalry	Gallantry on scouts after Indians.
—	Christian Steiner	Army	Saddler	Chiricahua Mountains, Arizona Territory	Oct 20, 1869	Company G, 8th US Cavalry	"Gallantry in action."
—	Benjamin F. Stewart	Army	Private	Big Horn River, Montana Territory	Jul 9, 1876	Company E, 7th US Infantry	Carried dispatches to Gen. Crook at imminent risk of his life.
—	Julius H. Stickoffer	Army	Saddler	Cienaga Springs, Utah	Nov 11, 1868	Company L, 8th US Cavalry	"Gallantry in action."
—	Thomas W. Stivers †	Army	Private	Little Big Horn, Montana Territory	Jun 25, 1876 – Jun 26, 1876	Company D, 7th US Cavalry	Voluntarily brought water to the wounded under fire.
—	Alonzo Stokes	Army	First Sergeant	Wichita River, Texas	Jul 12, 1870	Company H, 6th US Cavalry	"Gallantry in action."
—	William H. Strayer	Army	Private	Loupe Forke, Platte River, Nebraska	Apr 26, 1872	Company B, 3rd US Cavalry	"Gallantry in action."
—	Benoni Strivson	Army	Private	Arizona Territory	Aug 1868 – Oct 1868	Company B, 8th US Cavalry	Bravery in scouts and actions against Indians.
—	Simon Suhler (Note: Suhler served under the alias "Charles Gardner" and his medal was issued in that name.)	Army	Private	Arizona Territory	Aug 1868 – Oct 1868	Company B, 8th US Cavalry	Bravery in scouts and actions against Indians. Served under the assumed name of Charles Gardner.
—	Thomas Sullivan	Army	Private	Chiricahua Mountains, Arizona Territory	Oct 20, 1869	Company G, 1st US Cavalry	"Gallantry in action" against Indians concealed in a ravine.
—	Thomas Sullivan	Army	Private	Wounded Knee Creek, South Dakota	Dec 29, 1890	Company E, 7th US Cavalry	Conspicuous bravery in action against Indians concealed in a ravine.
—	James Sumner	Army	Private	Chiricahua Mountains, Arizona Territory	Oct 20, 1869	Company G, 1st US Cavalry	"Gallantry in action."
—	John A. Sutherland	Army	Corporal	Arizona Territory	Aug 1868 – Oct 1868	Company L, 8th US Cavalry	Bravery in scouts and actions against Indians.

== T ==
Image	Name	Service	Rank	Place of action	Date of action	Unit	Notes
	Bernard Taylor	Army	Sergeant	Near Sunset Pass, Arizona Territory	Nov 1, 1874	Company A, 5th US Cavalry	Bravery in rescuing Lt. King, 5th U.S. Cavalry, from Indians.
—	Charles Taylor	Army	First Sergeant	Big Dry Wash, Arizona Territory	Jul 17, 1882	Company D, 3rd US Cavalry	"Gallantry in action."
—	Wilbur N. Taylor	Army	Corporal	Arizona Territory	1868–69	Company K, 8th US Cavalry	Bravery in actions with Indians.
—	Richard L. Tea	Army	Sergeant	Sappa Creek, Kansas	Apr 23, 1875	Company H, 6th US Cavalry	With 5 other men he waded in mud and water up the creek to a position directly behind an entrenched Cheyenne position, who were using natural bank pits to good advantage against the main column. This surprise attack from the enemy rear broke their resistance.
	Charles L. Thomas	Army	Sergeant	Powder River, Montana Territory and Dakota Territory	Sep 17, 1865	Company E, 11th Ohio Cavalry	Carried a message through a country infested with hostile Indians and saved the life of a comrade en route.
—	George W. Thompson	Army	Private	Little Blue, Nebraska	May 15, 1870	Company C, 2nd US Cavalry	"Gallantry in action."
—	John Thompson	Army	Sergeant	Chiricahua Mountains, Arizona Territory	Oct 20, 1869	Company G, 1st US Cavalry	Bravery in action with Indians.
—	Peter Thompson	Army	Private	Battle of the Little Bighorn	Jun 25, 1876	Company C, 7th US Cavalry	Brought water to the wounded, even after being shot through the head.
	Henry R. Tilton	Army	Major and Surgeon	Bear Paw Mountain, Montana Territory	Sep 30, 1877		Fearlessly risked his life and displayed great gallantry in rescuing and protecting the wounded men.
—	Frank Tolan	Army	Private	Little Big Horn, Montana Territory	Jun 25, 1876	Company D, 7th US Cavalry	Voluntarily brought water to the wounded under fire.
	Frederick E. Toy	Army	First Sergeant	Wounded Knee Creek, South Dakota	Dec 29, 1890	Company G, 7th US Cavalry	Bravery.
—	John Tracy	Army	Private	Chiricahua Mountains, Arizona Territory	Oct 20, 1869	Company G, 8th US Cavalry	Bravery in action with Indians.
—	Jacob Trautman	Army	First Sergeant	Wounded Knee Creek, South Dakota	Dec 29, 1890	Company I, 7th US Cavalry	Killed a hostile Indian at close quarters, and, although entitled to retirement from service, remained to the close of the campaign.
—	James H. Turpin	Army	First Sergeant	Arizona Territory	1872–74	Company L, 5th US Cavalry	"Gallantry in action"s with Apaches.

== V ==
Image	Name	Service	Rank	Place of action	Date of action	Unit	Notes
	Charles A. Varnum	Army	Captain	White Clay Creek, South Dakota	Dec 30, 1890	Company A, 7th US Cavalry	While executing an order to withdraw, seeing that a continuance of the movement would expose another troop of his regiment to being cut off and surrounded, he disregarded orders to retire, placed himself in front of his men, led a charge upon the advancing Indians, regained a commanding position that had just been vacated, and thus insured a safe withdrawal of both detachments without further loss.
—	Ernest Veuve	Army	Farrier	Staked Plains, Texas	Nov 3, 1874	Company A, 4th US Cavalry	Gallant manner in which he faced a desperate Indian.
—	Otto Voit	Army	Saddler	Little Big Horn, Montana Territory	Jun 25, 1876	Company H, 7th US Cavalry	Volunteered with George Geiger, Charles Windolph, and Henry Mechlin to hold an exposed position standing erect on the brow of the hill facing the Little Big Horn River. They fired constantly in this manner for more than 20 minutes diverting fire and attention from another group filling canteens of water that were desperately needed.
—	Leroy H. Vokes	Army	First Sergeant	Loupe Fork, Platte River, Nebraska	Apr 26, 1872	Company B, 3rd US Cavalry	"Gallantry in action."
—	Rudolph von Medem	Army	Sergeant	Army	1872–73	Company A, 5th US Cavalry	"Gallantry in action"s and campaigns.

== W ==
Image	Name	Service	Rank	Place of action	Date of action	Unit	Notes
—	Allen Walker	Army	Private	Texas	Dec 30, 1891	Company C, 3rd US Cavalry	While carrying dispatches, he attacked a party of 3 armed men and secured papers valuable to the United States.
—	John Walker	Army	Private	Red Creek, Arizona Territory	Sep 23, 1869	Company D, 8th US Cavalry	"Gallantry in action" with Indians.
—	William Wallace	Army	Sergeant	Cedar Creek, etc., Montana Territory	Oct 21, 1876 – Jan 8, 1877	Company C, 5th US Infantry	"Gallantry in action."
	Augustus Walley	Army	Private	Cuchillo Negro Mountains, New Mexico Territory	Aug 16, 1881	Company I, 9th US Cavalry	Bravery in action with hostile Apaches.
—	Charles H. Ward	Army	Private	Chiricahua Mountains, Arizona Territory	Oct 20, 1869	Company G, 1st US Cavalry	"Gallantry in action" with Indians.
—	James Ward	Army	Sergeant	Wounded Knee Creek, South Dakota	Dec 29, 1890	Company B, 7th US Cavalry	For distinguished bravery in action against hostile Sioux Indians, at Wounded Knee Creek, South Dakota, where, although severely wounded, he continued fighting.
—	John Ward	Army	Sergeant	Pecos River, Texas	Apr 25, 1875	Indian Scouts, attached to US 24th Infantry	With 3 other men, he participated in a charge against 25 hostiles while on a scouting patrol.
—	Lewis Warrington	Army	First Lieutenant	Muchague Valley, Texas	Dec 8, 1874	4th US Cavalry	Gallantry in a combat with 5 Indians.
—	James C. Watson	Army	Corporal	Wichita River, Texas	Jul 12, 1870	Company L, 6th US Cavalry	"Gallantry in action."
—	Joseph Watson	Army	Private	Near Picacho Mountain, Arizona Territory	Jun 4, 1869	Company F, 8th US Cavalry	Killed an Indian warrior and captured his arms.
—	Andrew J. Weaher	Army	Private	Arizona Territory	Aug 1868 – Oct 1868	Company B, 8th US Cavalry	Bravery in scouts and actions against Indians.
	Paul H. Weinert	Army	Corporal	Wounded Knee Creek, South Dakota	Dec 29, 1890	Company E, 1st US Artillery	For gallantry and enterprise in action against hostile Sioux Indians, at Wounded Knee Creek, South Dakota.
—	Enoch R. Weiss	Army	Private	Chiricahua Mountains, Arizona Territory	Oct 20, 1869	Company G, 1st US Cavalry	"Gallantry in action" with Indians.
—	Charles H. Welch	Army	Sergeant	Little Big Horn, Montana Territory	Jun 25, 1876 – Jun 26, 1876	Company D, 7th US Cavalry	Voluntarily brought water to the wounded under fire.
—	Michael Welch	Army	Sergeant	Wichita River, Texas	Oct 5, 1870	Company M, 6th US Cavalry	"Gallantry in action."
	Frank West	Army	First Lieutenant	Big Dry Wash, Arizona Territory	Jul 17, 1882	6th US Cavalry	Rallied his command and led it in the advance against the enemy's fortifled position.
—	Patton G. Whitehead	Army	Private	Cedar Creek, etc., Montana Territory	Oct 21, 1876 – Jan 8, 1877	Company C, 5th US Infantry	"Gallantry in action."
—	Jacob Widmer	Army	First Sergeant	Milk River, Colo.	Sep 29, 1879	Company D, 5th US Cavalry	Volunteered to accompany a small detachment on a very dangerous mission.
	Wilber E. Wilder	Army	First Lieutenant	Horseshoe Canyon, New Mexico Territory	Apr 23, 1882	4th US Cavalry	Assisted, under a heavy fire, to rescue a wounded comrade.
—	Henry Wilkens	Army	First Sergeant	Little Muddy Creek, Mont. and Camas Meadows, Idaho Territory	May 7, 1877 and Aug 20, 1877	Company L, 2nd US Cavalry	Bravery in actions with Indians.
	Moses Williams	Army	First Sergeant	foothills of the Cuchillo Negro Mountains, New Mexico Territory	Aug 16, 1881	Company I, 9th US Cavalry	Rallied a detachment, skillfully conducted a running flight of 3 or 4 hours, and by his coolness, bravery, and unflinching devotion to duty in standing by his commanding officer in an exposed position under a heavy fire from a large party of Indians saved the lives of at least 3 of his comrades.
—	Henry Wills	Army	Private	Near Fort Selden, New Mexico Territory	Jul 8, 1873 – Jul 11, 1873	Company C, 8th U.S. Cavalry	Services against hostile Indians.
—	Benjamin Wilson	Army	Private	Wichita River, Texas	Oct 5, 1870	Company M, 6th U.S. Cavalry	"Gallantry in action."
—	Charles Wilson	Army	Corporal	Cedar Creek, etc., Montana Territory	Oct 21, 1876 – Jan 8, 1877	Company H, 5th U.S. Infantry	"Gallantry in action."
—	Milden H. Wilson	Army	Sergeant	Big Hole, Montana Territory	Aug 9, 1877	Company I, 7th U.S. Infantry	Gallantry in forming company from line of skirmishers and deploying again under a galling fire, and in carrying dispatches at the imminent risk of his life.
	William Wilson	Army	Sergeant	Colorado Valley, Texas	Mar 28, 1872	Company I, 4th U.S. Cavalry	(1st award) In pursuit of a band of cattle thieves from New Mexico Territory.
—	William Wilson	Army	Sergeant	Red River, Texas	Sep 29, 1872	Company I, 4th U.S. Cavalry	(2nd award) Distinguished conduct in action with Indians.
—	William O. Wilson	Army	Corporal	Sioux Campaign	1890	Company I, 9th U.S. Cavalry	Private (then Corporal) William O. Wilson, Troop I, 9th Cavalry: For gallantry in carrying a message for assistance through country occupied by the enemy, when the wagon train under escort of Captain Loud was attacked by hostile Sioux Indians, near the Pine Ridge Agency, South Dakota.
—	Charles Windolph	Army	Private	Little Big Horn, Montana Territory	Jun 25, 1876 – Jun 26, 1876	Company H, 7th U.S. Cavalry	With 3 comrades, during the entire engagement, courageously held a position that secured water for the command.
—	Claron A. Windus	Army	Bugler	Wichita River, Texas	Jul 12, 1870	Company L, 6th U.S. Cavalry	"Gallantry in action."
—	William Winterbottom	Army	Sergeant	Wichita River, Texas	Jul 12, 1870	Company A, 6th U.S. Cavalry	"Gallantry in action."
—	Joseph Witcome	Army	Private	Arizona Territory	Aug 1868 – Oct 1868	Company B, 8th U.S. Cavalry	Bravery in scouts and actions against Indians.
	Leonard Wood	Army	Assistant Surgeon	In Apache campaign	Summer of 1886	Army	Voluntarily carried dispatches through hostile territory and assumed command of a detachment in pursuit of Geronimo's band.
—	Zachariah T. Woodall	Army	Sergeant	Washita River, Texas	Sep 12, 1874	Company I, 6th U.S. Cavalry	While in command of 5 men and carrying dispatches, was attacked by 125 Indians, whom, he with his command fought throughout the day, he being severely wounded. All four cavalry troopers and two civilian scouts in Woodall's courier detail were awarded the Medal of Honor for this hours-long battle along the Washita River (some texts say Wichita River, a more southernly tributary of the same Red River of the South watershed).
	Brent Woods	Army	Sergeant	New Mexico Territory	Aug 19, 1881	Company B, 9th U.S. Cavalry	Saved the lives of his comrades and citizens of the detachment.
—	George G. Wortman	Army	Sergeant	Arizona Territory	Aug 1868 – Oct 1868	Company B, 8th U.S. Cavalry	Bravery in scouts and actions against Indians.

== Y ==
Image	Name	Service	Rank	Place of action	Date of action	Unit	Notes
—	John P. Yount	Army	Private	Whetstone Mountains, Arizona Territory	May 5, 1871	Company F, 3rd US Cavalry	"Gallantry in action" with Indians.

== Z ==
Image	Name	Service	Rank	Place of action	Date of action	Unit	Notes
—	Hermann Ziegner	Army	Private	Wounded Knee Creek and White Clay Creek, South Dakota	Dec 29, 1890 – Dec 30, 1890	Troop E, 7th US Cavalry	For conspicuous bravery in an attack on hostile Sioux Indians, concealed in a ravine at Wounded Knee Creek, South Dakota, on the 29th, and again near the Catholic Mission, on White Clay Creek, South Dakota, on the 30th, in defense of the crest of a hill against a force of hostile Sioux Indians.
