= John O'Callaghan (Medal of Honor) =

American soldier in the United States Army

- Born: New York City, New York, United States
- Died: San Francisco, California
- Military career
- Allegiance: United States of America
- Branch: United States Army
- Service years: c. 1868–1869
- Rank: Sergeant
- Unit: 8th U.S. Cavalry
- Conflicts: Indian Wars; Apache Wars
- Awards: Medal of Honor

Sergeant John O'Callaghan (fl. 1868 – 1870) was an American soldier in the United States Army who served with the 8th U.S. Cavalry Regiment during the Indian Wars. He was among the 34 men received the Medal of Honor for "bravery in scouts and actions" during several engagements against the Apache Indians in the Arizona Territory between August and October 1868.

== Biography ==
John O'Callaghan was born in New York City, New York, United States. O'Callaghan later moved to San Francisco, California. While living in San Francisco, O'Callaghan enlisted in the United States Army. Assigned to frontier duty with B Company of the Eighth United States Cavalry regiment, O'Callaghan participated in campaigns against the Apache Indians in the Arizona Territory during the late 1860s and eventually rose through the non-commissioned ranks, gaining promotion to the rank of sergeant. Between August and October 1868, O'Callaghan was involved in several engagements with the Apache and was cited for "bravery in scouts and actions against Indians". On July 24, 1869, in one of the U.S. Army's largest award presentations at the time, O'Callaghan and thirty other members, including Private Michael O'Regan, of his regiment received the Medal of Honor, the United States' highest military decoration awarded in cases of "conspicuously by gallantry and intrepidity at the risk of his or her life above and beyond the call of duty while engaged in an action against an enemy of the United States".

== Medal of Honor citation ==
Rank and organization: Sergeant, Company B, 8th U.S. Cavalry. Place and date: Arizona, August to October 1868. Entered service at: ------. Birth: New York, N.Y. Date of issue: 24 July 1869.

Citation:

Bravery in scouts and actions against Indians.

== See also ==
- List of Medal of Honor recipients for the Indian Wars
