= John Moran (Medal of Honor) =

United States Army Medal of Honor recipient

- Born: c. 1830
- Died: 1905
- Burial place: Lidy Hot Springs, Idaho
- Military career
- Allegiance: United States
- Branch: United States Army
- Rank: Private
- Unit: 8th Cavalry Regiment
- Conflicts: Indian Wars
- Awards: Medal of Honor

John Moran (c. 1830 – 1905) was an American cavalry soldier who received the United States military's highest decoration for bravery, the Medal of Honor, for his actions during the American Indian Wars.

== Biography ==
According to the 1900 census he was born in January, 1830 in Maine, with his father's birthplace listed as France and his mother's as Canada. Other sources give his birthplace as Ireland or Lyon, France. He joined the United States Army, serving as a soldier in the cavalry. During the Indian Wars (1866–1890), while serving as a private in Company F of the 8th Cavalry Regiment, Moran participated in the Battle of Seneca Mountain, Arizona on August 25, 1869. After the battle he was presented the Medal of Honor March 3, 1870 for "Gallantry in action".

Four other members of Company F received the Medal of Honor for the same battle: Corporal Philip Murphy, Corporal Thomas Murphy, Corporal Edward Stanley, and Private Herbert Mahers.

Moran was discharged for disability in 1881. He died in the winter of 1905 and is buried in a cemetery at Lidy Hot Springs, Idaho.

Lidy Hot Springs cemetery was unmarked until 2010, when it was located as part of a community effort to locate and mark abandoned cemeteries in Clark County, Idaho. The cemetery was fenced and a grave marker for Moran was placed within the cemetery. No attempt was made to mark the actual location of his grave, because no cemetery records exist that would reveal it.

== Medal of Honor citation ==
Rank and organization: Private, Company F, 8th U.S. Cavalry. Place and date: At Seneca Mountain, Ariz., 25 August 1869. Entered service at:------. Birth: Ireland. Date of issue: 3 March 1870.

Citation:

Gallantry in action.

== See also ==
- List of Medal of Honor recipients for the Indian Wars
