= William Osborn (Medal of Honor) =

American soldier in the U.S. Army

- Born: 1837; Boston, Massachusetts, United States
- Died: May 17, 1887 (aged 50); Washington, D.C.
- Burial place: United States Soldiers' and Airmen's Home National Cemetery
- Military career
- Allegiance: United States of America
- Branch: United States Army
- Service years: c. 1872–1875
- Rank: Sergeant
- Unit: 1st U.S. Cavalry
- Conflicts: Indian Wars; Apache Wars
- Awards: Medal of Honor

William Osborn or Osborne (1837 – May 17, 1887) was an American soldier in the U.S. Army who served with the 1st U.S. Cavalry during the Indian Wars. He was one of several men who received the Medal of Honor for gallantry during Lieutenant Colonel George Crook's "winter campaign" against the Apache Indians in the Arizona Territory during 1872 and 1873.

== Biography ==
William Osborn was born in Boston, Massachusetts, in 1837. He later enlisted in the U.S. Army and became a member of the 1st U.S. Cavalry. He participated in the Indian Wars against the Plains Indians during the 1870s and eventually reached the rank of sergeant. During the Apache Wars, he served under Lieutenant Colonel George Crook in his "winter campaign" of 1872–73. He distinguished himself in several battles with the Apache in the Arizona Territory during this time and, on April 12, 1875, was among the members of his regiment to receive the Medal of Honor for "gallant conduct during campaigns and engagements with Apaches". Osborn died in Washington, D.C., on May 17, 1887, at the age of 50. He was interred at the United States Soldiers' and Airmen's Home National Cemetery.

== Medal of Honor citation ==
Rank and organization: Sergeant, Company M, 1st U.S. Cavalry. Place and date: Winter of 1872–73. Entered service at: ------. Birth: Boston, Mass. Date of issue: 12 April 1875.

Citation:

Gallant conduct during campaigns and engagements with Apaches.

== See also ==
- List of Medal of Honor recipients for the Indian Wars
