= Sanford Bradbury =

United States Army Medal of Honor recipient

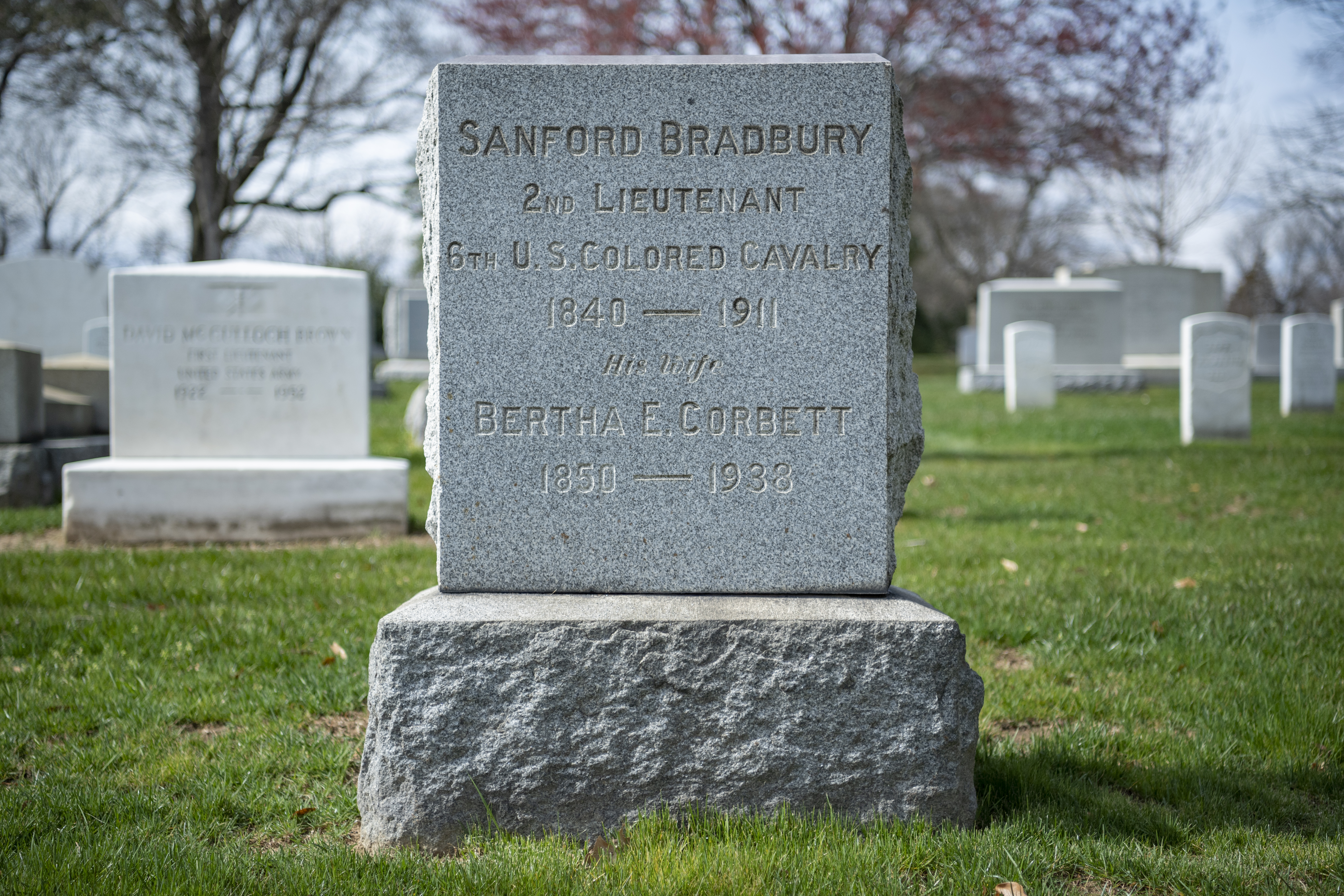
- Grave at Arlington National Cemetery
- Born: April 8, 1840; Newton, New Jersey, US
- Died: December 7, 1911 (aged 71); Arlington, Virginia, US
- Burial place: Arlington National Cemetery
- Military career
- Allegiance: United States
- Branch: United States Army
- Rank: First Sergeant
- Unit: 8th Cavalry Regiment
- Conflicts: Indian Wars
- Awards: Medal of Honor

Sandford Bradbury (1840–1911) was a First Sergeant in the United States Army who received the Medal of Honor for his actions during the Indian Wars.

== Early life ==
Sanford was born in Newton, New Jersey, on April 8, 1840. He enlisted in the Army on November 1, 1866, in Washington DC, and he was the First Sergeant of Company L, 8th US Cavalry when he displayed actions near Hells Canyon Wilderness, Arizona Territory, that would earn him the Medal of Honor. The citation reads:

== Medal of Honor ==
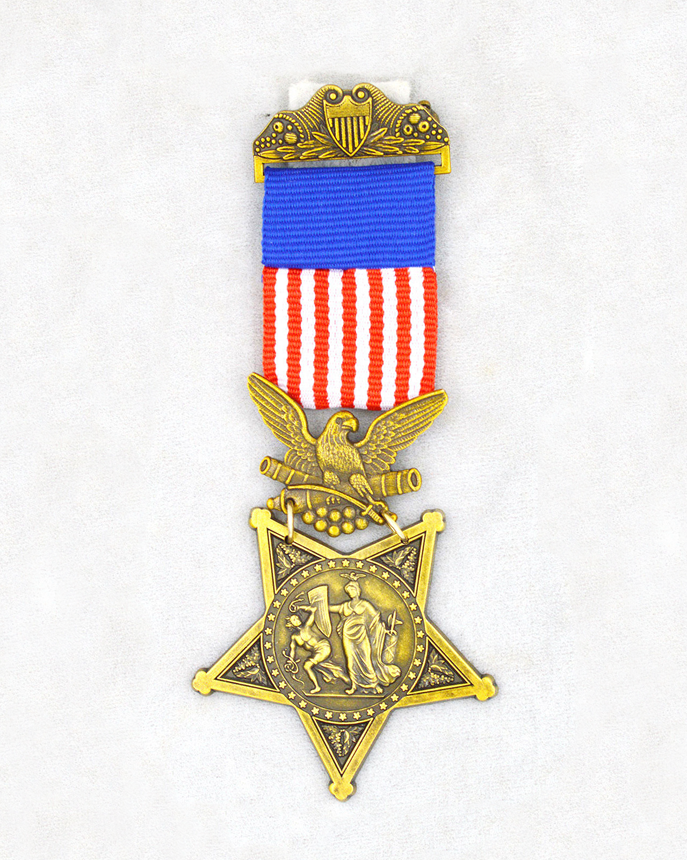
Army Medal of Honor, 1862–1895

Rank and organization: First Sergeant, Company L, 8th US Cavalry. Place and date: Near Hells Canyon, Arizona Territory, July 3, 1869. Birth: Newton, New Jersey. Date of issue: March 3, 1870.

Citation:

Conspicuous gallantry in action

== Later life ==
Sanford received the Medal of Honor on March 3, 1870, and he ended his enlistment in November 1871, at Fort Union, New Mexico. He was married to Bertha and the couple had three children. Sanford Bradbury died on December 7, 1911, at the age of 71, and he is buried with his wife in Arlington National Cemetery.

== See also ==
- List of Medal of Honor recipients
- List of Medal of Honor recipients for the Indian Wars
