= John Merrill (Medal of Honor) =

John Mitchell Merrill
- Born: July 4, 1846; Queens, New York
- Died: June 10, 1883 (aged 36); Fort D.A. Russell, Wyoming
- Burial place: Olivet Catholic Cemetery Cheyenne, Wyoming
- Military career
- Allegiance: United States of America
- Branch: United States Army
- Rank: Sergeant
- Units: Company F, 5th U.S. Cavalry
- Conflicts: Battle of Milk Creek / Indian Wars
- Awards: Medal of Honor

John Mitchell Merrill (1846 - 1883) was an American soldier from New York City and a recipient of the Medal of Honor for service during the Indian Wars.

Sergeant Merrill served in the 5th U.S. Cavalry, Company F. At the battle of Milk Creek, Colorado on September 29, 1879, his conduct was exemplary. He earned special commendation because, although painfully wounded, "he remained on duty and rendered gallant and valuable service" while being besieged by Ute warriors in a wagon corral for 5 days.

The Medal of Honor was officially presented in a ceremony on June 7, 1880.

Merrill is buried in Olivet Catholic Cemetery, which is located in Cheyenne, Wyoming.

== See also ==
- List of Medal of Honor recipients for the Indian Wars
