= Denis Byrne (Medal of Honor) =

Irish-born soldier in the U.S. Army

- Born: c. 1833; Wexford, Ireland
- Died: December 31, 1905 (aged 72); Bird Island, Minnesota, United States
- Military career
- Allegiance: United States of America
- Branch: United States Army
- Service years: c. 1876–c. 1878
- Rank: Sergeant
- Unit: 5th U.S. Infantry
- Conflicts: Indian Wars
- Awards: Medal of Honor

Denis Byrne (c. 1833 – December 31, 1905) was an Irish-born soldier in the U.S. Army who served with the 5th U.S. Infantry during the Indian Wars. He was among the 31 soldiers who received the Medal of Honor for during General Nelson A. Miles "winter campaign" against the Sioux Indians in the Montana Territory between October 1876 and January 1877.

== Biography ==
Born in Wexford, Ireland in about 1833, Denis Byrne emigrated to the United States where he settled in New York City. He eventually enlisted in the U.S. Army and was sent to the frontier to serve with 5th U.S. Infantry. By the start of General Nelson A. Miles "winter campaign" against the Sioux Indians in the Montana Territory, Byrne had become a veteran Indian fighter and reached the rank of sergeant. Between October 1876 and January 1877, he participated in many battles against the Sioux, most notably, against Chief Sitting Bull at Cedar Creek. He and 31 other soldiers were received the Medal of Honor for "gallantry in engagements" with the Sioux at Cedar Creek and other actions. He died at Bird Island, Minnesota on December 31, 1905, at age 72.

== Medal of Honor citation ==
Rank and organization: Sergeant, Company G, 5th U.S. Infantry. Place and date: At Cedar Creek, etc., Mont., October 1876 to January 1877. Entered service at:------. Birth: Ireland. Date of issue. April 27, 1877.

Citation:

Gallantry in engagements.

== See also ==
- List of Medal of Honor recipients for the Indian Wars
