= John Thompson (soldier, born 1842) =

- Born: c. 1842; Glasgow, Scotland
- Died: Unknown
- Military career
- Allegiance: United States
- Branch: United States Army
- Service years: c. 1868–1869
- Rank: Sergeant
- Unit: 1st U.S. Cavalry
- Conflicts: Indian Wars; Apache Wars
- Awards: Medal of Honor

Sergeant John Thompson (c. 1842 – unknown) was a Scottish-born soldier in the U.S. Army who served with the 1st U.S. Cavalry during the Apache Wars. He received the Medal of Honor for gallantry against a hostile band of Apache Indians at the Chiricahua Mountains of Arizona on October 20, 1869.

== Biography ==
John Thompson was born in Glasgow, Scotland in about 1842. He later emigrated to the United States and enlisted as a private in the United States Army in Chicago, Illinois. A member of the 1st U.S. Cavalry Regiment, Thompson saw action during the Apache Wars in the Arizona Territory and eventually reached the rank of sergeant. On October 20, 1869, he distinguished himself in battle against the Apache in the Chiricahua Mountains and received the Medal of Honor for "bravery in action with Indians".

== Medal of Honor citation ==
Rank and organization: Sergeant, Company G, 1st U.S. Cavalry. Place and date: At Chiricahua Mountains, Ariz., 20 October 1869. Entered service at: New York, N.Y. Birth: Scotland. Date of issue: 14 February 1870.

Citation:

Bravery in action with Indians.

== See also ==
- List of Medal of Honor recipients for the Indian Wars
