= Lewis Phife =

- Born: October 20, 1841; Burlington, Iowa
- Died: January 31, 1913 (aged 71); Wever, Iowa
- Burial place: Tierney Cemetery, Wever, Iowa
- Military career
- Allegiance: United States
- Branch: United States Army
- Rank: Sergeant
- Unit: 8th U.S. Cavalry
- Conflicts: American Indian Wars
- Awards: Medal of Honor

Lewis Phife (1841 – 1913) was a U.S. Cavalry soldier. He received the Medal of Honor for gallantry in action against Apache Indians in the Arizona Territory. Phife left his hometown of Burlington, Iowa at the age of 19 to move westward. He settled in Marion County, Oregon and in 1865 volunteered for service with Company F of the 1st Oregon Volunteer Infantry. At the conclusion of the Civil War he enlisted in the Regular Army.

== Medal of Honor citation ==
The President of the United States of America, in the name of Congress, takes pleasure in presenting the Medal of Honor to Sergeant Lewis Phife, United States Army, for bravery in scouts and actions against Indians from August to October 1868, while serving with Company B, 8th U.S. Cavalry, in action in Arizona Territory.

The Medal was awarded on July 24, 1869.

== See also ==
- List of Medal of Honor recipients
- List of Medal of Honor recipients for the Indian Wars
