= James Brown (Medal of Honor) =

United States Army Medal of Honor recipient (c. 1847–?)

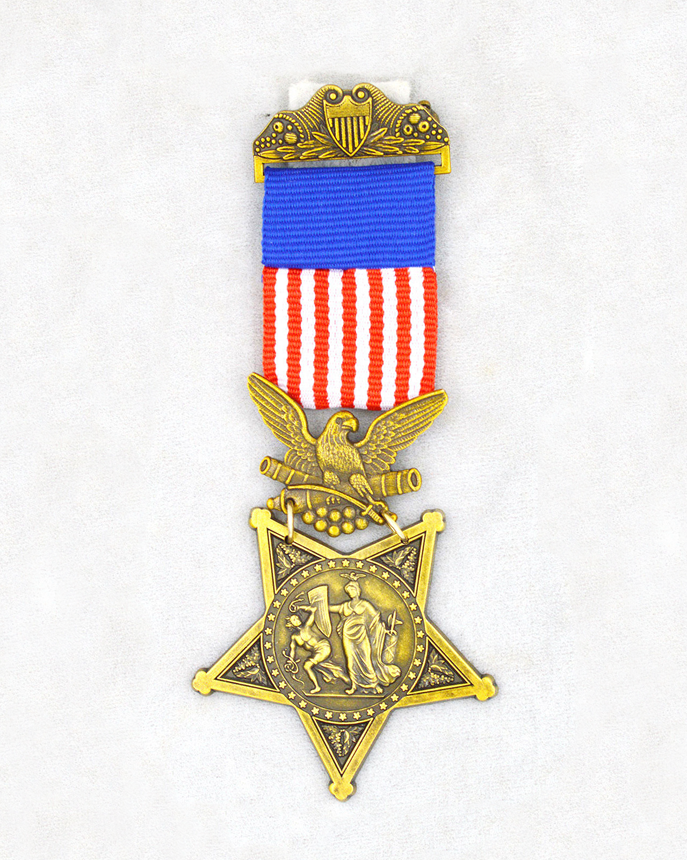
- Army Medal of Honor, 1862–1895
- Born: c. 1847; Wexford, Ireland
- Died: unknown
- Burial place: unknown
- Military career
- Branch: United States Army
- Rank: Sergeant
- Unit: 5th Cavalry Regiment
- Conflicts: Indian Wars
- Awards: Medal of Honor

James Brown (c. 1847–unknown) was a Sergeant in the United States Army who received the Medal of Honor for his actions during the Indian Wars.

== Early life ==
James was born in Wexford, Ireland, in about 1847. He was a Sergeant in Company F, 5th US Cavalry when he displayed actions near the Davidson Canyon, Arizona, that would earn him the Medal of Honor.

== Medal of Honor ==
Rank and organization: Sergeant, Company F, 5th US Cavalry. Place and date: Near Davidson Canyon, Arizona Territory, August 27, 1872. Birth: Wexford, Ireland. Date of issue: December 4, 1874.

Citation:

In command of a detachment of four men, defeated a superior force.

== Later life ==
James received the Medal of Honor on December 4, 1874, and the date of his death is unknown, as well as his final resting place.

== See also ==
- List of Medal of Honor recipients
- List of Medal of Honor recipients for the Indian Wars
