= Otto Voit =

Otto Emil Voit
- Born: February 5, 1845; Germany
- Died: June 1, 1906 (aged 61); Louisville, Kentucky, US
- Military career
- Allegiance: United States of America
- Branch: United States Army
- Service years: 1864 - 1898
- Rank: Sergeant
- Unit: U.S. 7th Cavalry Regiment
- Conflicts: Indian Wars: Battle of the Little Bighorn
- Awards: Medal of Honor

Otto Emil Voit (February 5, 1845 – June 1, 1906) was a United States Army soldier and a recipient of America's highest military decoration—the Medal of Honor—for his actions in the Battle of the Little Bighorn.

== Biography ==
Voit was a "saddler" (saddle-maker) with the U.S. Army. He joined the army from Louisville, Kentucky in December 1864. He deserted his unit at a Missouri River post on February 21, 1866, and subsequently reenlisted in Company H of George Armstrong Custer's Seventh Cavalry in December 1866 using the alias Frank May. On December 15, 1873, he surrendered as a deserter and received clemency by Presidential proclamation.

Voit was wounded in the Reno-Benteen hilltop action at the Little Bighorn. He was issued the Medal of Honor on October 5, 1878, for his actions during the battle, specifically for providing covering fire for his comrades who went to get water for the wounded on June 25, 1876.

Voit was discharged in 1898 as Saddler Sergeant at Fort Grant, Arizona. He died at age 61 and was buried in Saint Stephens Cemetery in Louisville.

== Medal of Honor citation ==
Rank and organization: Saddler, Company H, 7th U.S. Cavalry. Place and date: At Little Big Horn, Mont., June 25, 1876. Entered service at: ------. Birth: Germany. Date of issue: October 5, 1878.

Citation:

Volunteered with George Geiger, Charles Windolph, and Henry Mechlin to hold an exposed position standing erect on the brow of the hill facing the Little Big Horn River. They fired constantly in this manner for more than 20 minutes diverting fire and attention from another group filling canteens of water that were desperately needed.

== See also ==
- List of Medal of Honor recipients
- List of Medal of Honor recipients for the Indian Wars
