= James Brophy (soldier) =

United States Army Medal of Honor recipient (1846–1929)

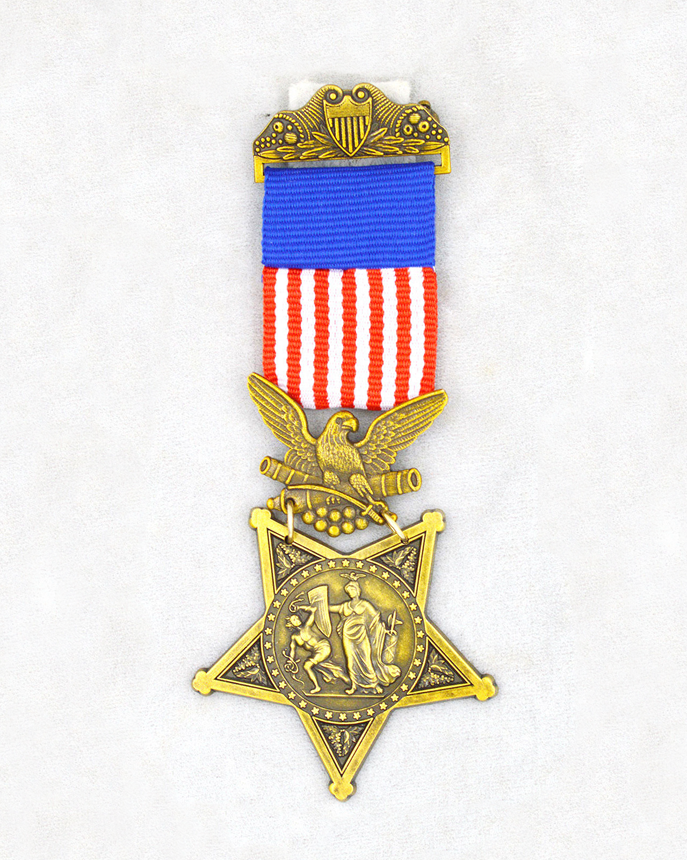
- Army Medal of Honor, 1862–1895
- Born: May 20, 1846; Kilkenny, Ireland
- Died: August 7, 1929 (aged 83); Washington DC, US
- Burial place: United States Soldiers’ and Airmen's Home National Cemetery
- Military career
- Allegiance: United States
- Branch: United States Army
- Rank: Private
- Unit: 8th Cavalry Regiment
- Conflicts: Indian Wars
- Awards: Medal of Honor

James Brophy (May 20, 1846 – August 7, 1929) was a Private in the United States Army who received the Medal of Honor for his actions during the Indian Wars.

== Early life ==
Brophy was born on May 20, 1846, in Kilkenny, Ireland, and according to Ellis Island records, he immigrated to the US on January 1, 1864, on board the Albert Gallatin. Brophy enlisted in the Army and was deployed to the Arizona Territory with Company B of the 8th US Cavalry, where he displayed actions as a Private that would later earn him the Medal of Honor. The citation reads:

== Medal of Honor ==
Rank and organization: Private, Company B, 8th US Cavalry. Place and date: Near The Black Mountains, Arizona Territory, August 13, 1868. Birth: Kilkenny, Ireland. Date of issue: July 24, 1869.

Citation:

Bravery in scouts and actions against Indians

== Later life ==
It is possible that Brophy took part in the same actions as Heinrich Bertram, since they both received the Medal of Honor on July 24, 1869, and were both in the vicinity of the Black Mountains. Brophy had one son with a woman named Elizabeth Lampshire, but it is not clear if the two were ever married. James Brophy died August 7, 1929, at the age of 83 in Washington. D.C. He is buried in the US Soldiers’ and Airmen's Home National Cemetery in Washington, D.C.

== See also ==
- List of Medal of Honor recipients
- List of Medal of Honor recipients for the Indian Wars
