= Richard J. Nolan =

- Born: January 1, 1848; Ireland
- Died: August 26, 1905 (aged 57); Washington, D.C., U.S.
- Burial place: United States Soldiers' and Airmen's Home National Cemetery in Washington, D.C.
- Military career
- Allegiance: United States
- Branch: United States Army
- Service years: 1886–1891
- Rank: Sergeant
- Units: Company I, 7th U.S. Cavalry
- Conflicts: American Indian Wars
- Awards: Medal of Honor

Richard J. Nolan (January 1, 1848 – August 26, 1905) served in the United States Army during the American Indian Wars. He received the Medal of Honor.

Nolan was born on January 1, 1848, in Ireland. His official residence was listed as Milwaukee, Wisconsin. He joined the army from Fort Totten, Dakota Territory in September 1886, and was discharged in August 1891. He died on August 26, 1905, and was buried at the United States Soldiers' and Airmen's Home National Cemetery in Washington, D.C.

== Medal of Honor citation ==
His award citation reads:

For bravery in action on 30 December 1890, while serving with Company I, 7th U.S. Cavalry, in action at White Clay Creek, South Dakota.

== See also ==
- List of Medal of Honor recipients for the Indian Wars
