= Daniel Farren =

United States Army Medal of Honor recipient (1848–?)

- Born: c. 1848; County Londonderry, Ireland
- Military career
- Allegiance: United States
- Branch: United States Army
- Service years: c. 1868–1870
- Rank: Private
- Unit: 8th U.S. Cavalry
- Conflicts: Indian Wars; Apache Wars
- Awards: Medal of Honor

Daniel Farren (born c. 1848 – unknown) was an Irish-born soldier in the U.S. Army who served with the 8th U.S. Cavalry during the Apache Wars. He received the Medal of Honor for gallantry fighting the Apache Indians in the Black Mountains of Arizona from August to October 1868.

== Biography ==
Daniel Farren was born in County Londonderry, Ireland in about 1848. He later emigrated to the United States and enlisted in the U.S. Army in Philadelphia, Pennsylvania. He joined Company B of the 8th U.S. Cavalry and assigned to frontier duty in the Arizona Territory during the late 1860s. He was part of a small cavalry detachment numbering 50 or 60 soldiers, mostly from Company B and Company L, that protected settlers from Apache raiding parties during the late summer and autumn of 1868. Farren and the other troopers often fought the Apache during their patrols, most often in ambushes and sniper attacks from hidden ravines, many of whom were cited for gallantry in this period. Farren won particular distinction fighting the Apache in the Black Mountains. In one of the largest award presentations at the time, he was among the thirty-four troopers who received the Medal of Honor for "bravery in scouts and actions against Indians" on July 24, 1869.

Nothing is known from him after he deserted in October 1870.

== Medal of Honor citation ==
Rank and organization: Private, Company B, 8th U.S. Cavalry. Place and date: Arizona, August to October 1868. Entered service at:------. Birth: Ireland. Date of issue: July 24, 1869.

Citation:

Bravery in scouts and actions against Indians.

== See also ==
- List of Medal of Honor recipients for the Indian Wars
