= Andrew J. Weaher =

American soldier in the U.S. Army

- Born: May 22, 1842; Philadelphia, Pennsylvania, United States
- Died: August 27, 1920 (aged 78); Phoenix, Arizona, US
- Burial place: Greenwood/Memory Lawn Mortuary & Cemetery
- Military career
- Allegiance: United States
- Branch: United States Army
- Service years: c. 1868–1869
- Rank: Private
- Unit: 8th U.S. Cavalry
- Conflicts: Indian Wars; Apache Wars
- Awards: Medal of Honor

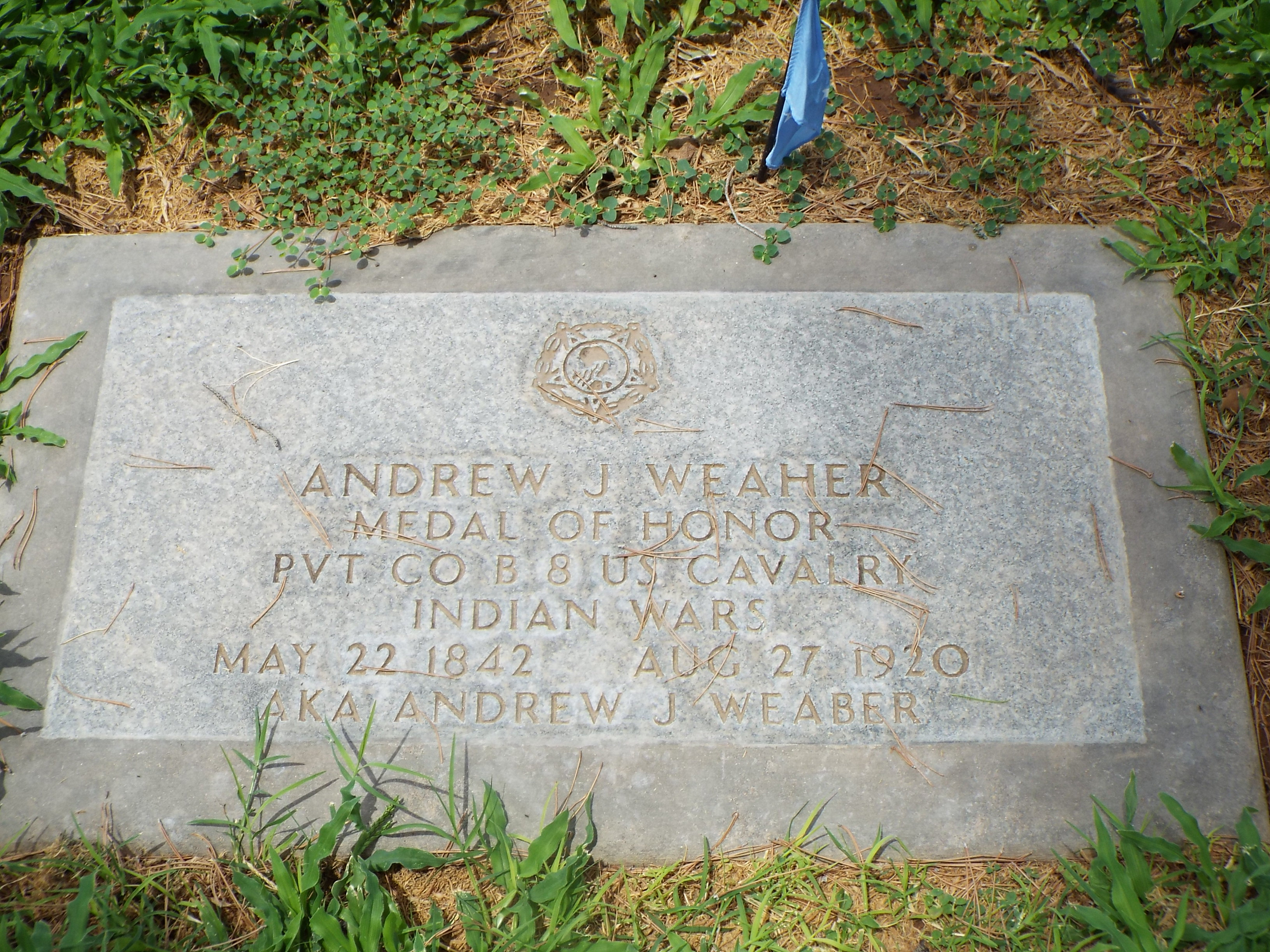
Grave site of Andrew J. Weaher

Private Andrew J. Weaher or Weaber (May 22, 1842 – August 27, 1920) was an American soldier in the U.S. Army who served with the 8th U.S. Cavalry during the Apache Wars. He was one of 34 men received the Medal of Honor for gallantry in several engagements against the Apache Indians, specifically in the Black Mountains of Arizona, from August to October 1868.

== Biography ==
Andrew J. Weaher (or Weaber) was born in Philadelphia, Pennsylvania on May 22, 1842, and enlisted in the United States Army there. He was assigned to frontier duty as a private with Company B of the 8th U.S. Cavalry Regiment and took part in the Apache Wars during the late 1860s. Weaher was among the 50 or 60 cavalry troopers ordered to secure settlements in the Arizona Territory and protect the region from Apache raiding parties during the late summer and fall of 1868. For a period of 90 days, from August 13 to October 31, 1868, he and other members of the 8th Cavalry faced the Apache in heavy fighting and often subjected to ambushes or sniper attacks from hidden ravines during their patrols. Winning distinction in battle against the Apache in Black Mountains, Weaher was among the thirty-four members of his regiment who were recommended for the Medal of Honor, officially cited for "bravery in scouts and actions against Indians", and received the award the following summer in one of the largest Medal of Honor presentations at the time. He died in Phoenix, Arizona on August 27, 1920, at the age of 78. He was the first of two MOH recipients to be interred in Greenwood/Memory Lawn Mortuary & Cemetery along with Vietnam War hero Oscar Austin.

== Medal of Honor citation ==
Rank and organization: Private, Company B, 8th U.S. Cavalry. Place and date: Arizona, August to October 1868. Entered service at:--. Birth: Philadelphia, Pa. Date of issue: 24 July 1869.

Citation:

Bravery in scouts and actions against Indians.

== See also ==
- List of Medal of Honor recipients for the Indian Wars
