= Patrick J. Burke =

United States Army Medal of Honor recipient (1835–?)

Patrick J Burke
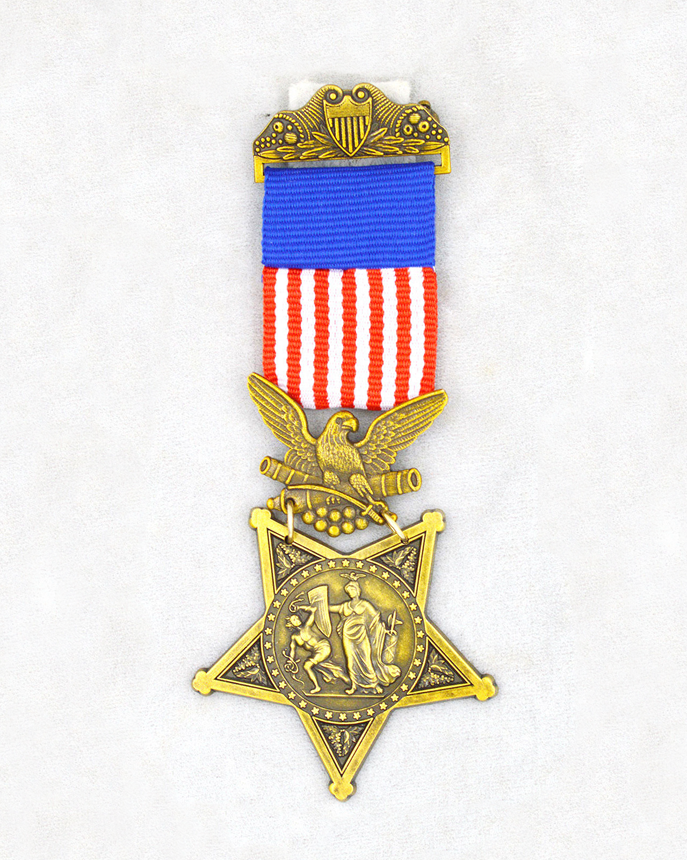
- Army Medal of Honor, 1862–1895
- Born: c. 1835; Kilkenny, Ireland
- Died: Unknown
- Burial place: Unknown
- Military career
- Allegiance: United States
- Branch: United States Army
- Rank: Private
- Unit: 8th Cavalry Regiment
- Conflicts: Indian Wars
- Awards: Medal of Honor

Patrick J Burke (c. 1835 – unknown) was a farrier in the United States Army who received the Medal of Honor for his actions during the Indian Wars.

== Early life ==
Patrick was born in Kilkenny, Ireland, in about 1835. Little is recorded about his life, but it is known that he was a farrier with the US Army’s 8th Cavalry and his actions from the 13 August to 31 October 1868, earned him the Medal of Honor. The citation reads:

== Medal of Honor ==
Rank and organization: Private, Company B, 8th US Cavalry. Place and date: Near The Black Mountains, Arizona Territory, August 13 – October 31, 1868. Birth: Kilkenny, Ireland. Date of issue: July 24, 1869.

Citation:

Bravery in scouts and actions against Indians

== Later life ==
Records show Patrick began a second enlistment in the US Army on 29 January 1872, at Santa Fe, New Mexico, but was discharged due to disability on 15 November 1872. There is no recorded death date or place of burial for Patrick.

== See also ==
- List of Medal of Honor recipients
- List of Medal of Honor recipients for the Indian Wars
