= Neil Bancroft =

- Born: 1846; Oswego, New York, U.S.
- Died: May 14, 1901 (aged 54–55); Highland Falls, New York, U.S.
- Military career
- Allegiance: United States
- Branch: United States Army
- Service years: 1873–1878
- Rank: Private
- Unit: 7th U.S. Cavalry
- Conflicts: Indian Wars; Black Hills War
- Awards: Medal of Honor

Neil Bancroft (1846–1901) was an American soldier in the U.S. Army who served with the 7th U.S. Cavalry during the Black Hills War. In 1878, he was one of 22 soldiers who received the Medal of Honor at the Battle of the Little Bighorn and who carried water "under a most galling fire" from the Little Bighorn River to the wounded soldiers on Reno Hill.

Bancroft left military service two months before the men of his regiment were issued the award. His medal was returned to the War Department because of this and, consequently, he remained unaware that he was an MOH recipient. When it was finally decided to locate him years later, it was found that Bancroft had died.

== Biography ==
Neil Bancroft was born in Oswego, New York in 1846. At age 18, he enlisted in the U.S. Army in Chicago on September 20, 1873. Sent to the frontier, he was assigned to Troop A of the 7th U.S. Cavalry then under the command of George Armstrong Custer. He saw action during the Black Hills War and, during the Battle of the Little Bighorn in June 1876, he was among the many soldiers who carried water "under a most galling fire" from the Little Bighorn River to the wounded soldiers at the Reno-Benteen site for much of the engagement. All of the Little Bighorn water carriers received the Medal of Honor for their "extraordinary bravery" on October 5, 1878. Bancroft, however, had left the service two months earlier and his medal was simply returned to the War Department. Throughout his life, Bancroft was unaware that he had received the nation's highest honor. By the time the government tracked down Bancroft to officially issue his medal, it was discovered he had died. His medal was eventually put on display in the Smithsonian Museum in Washington, D.C., where it remains to the present day.

== Medal of Honor citation ==
Rank and organization: Private, Company A, 7th U.S. Cavalry. Place and date: At Little Big Horn, Mont., June 25, 1876. Entered service at: Chicago, Ill. Birth: Oswego, N.Y. Date of issue: October 5, 1878.

Citation:

Brought water for the wounded under a most galling fire.

== See also ==
- List of Medal of Honor recipients for the Indian Wars
