= Edward Branagan =

United States Army Medal of Honor Recipient

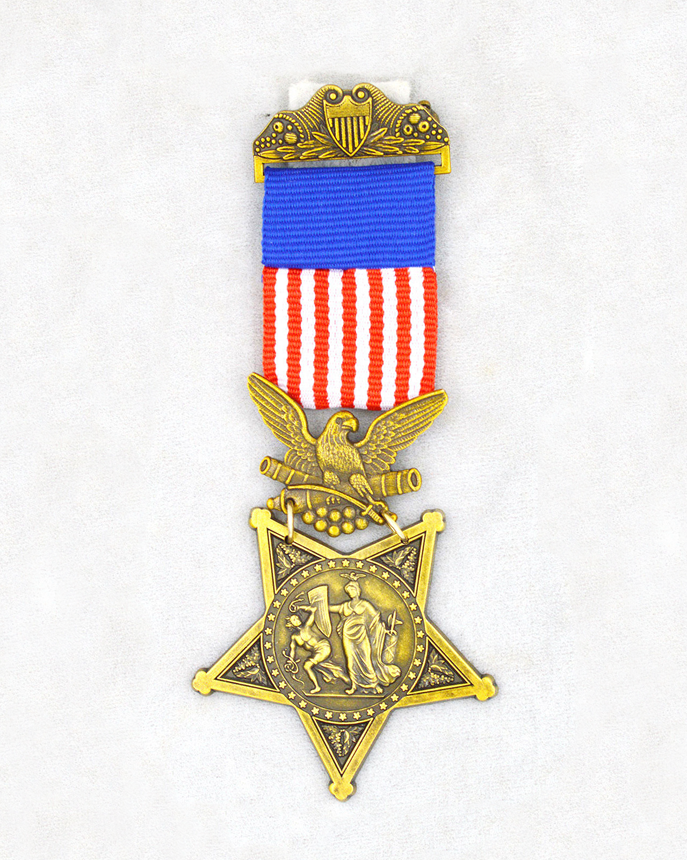
- Army Medal of Honor, 1862–1895
- Born: c. 1846; County Louth, Ireland
- Died: unknown
- Burial place: unknown
- Military career
- Branch: United States Army
- Rank: Private
- Unit: 4th Cavalry Regiment
- Conflicts: Indian Wars
- Awards: Medal of Honor

Edward Branagan (c. 1846–unknown) was a private in the United States Army who received the Medal of Honor for his actions during the Indian Wars.

== Early life ==
Edward was born in County Louth, Ireland, in 1847. He was a private in Company F, 4th US Cavalry when he displayed actions near the Red River of the South, Texas, that would earn him the Medal of Honor.

== Medal of Honor ==
Rank and organization: Private, Company F, 4th US Cavalry. Place and date: Near Red River, Texas, September 29, 1872. Birth: County Louth, Ireland. Date of issue: November 19, 1872.

Citation:

Gallantry in action.

== Later life ==
Edward received the Medal of Honor on November 19, 1872, and the date of his death is unknown, as well as his final resting place. There is a cenotaph for him at the Fort Concho National Historic Landmark, in San Angelo, Texas.

== See also ==
- List of Medal of Honor recipients
- List of Medal of Honor recipients for the Indian Wars
