= Hermann Fichter =

American soldier (1845–1912)

- Born: March 30, 1845; Grand Duchy of Baden, Germany
- Died: August 5, 1912 (aged 67); Quincy, Illinois, United States
- Burial place: Saint Boniface Cemetery
- Military career
- Allegiance: United States of America
- Branch: United States Army
- Service years: c. 1870–1871
- Rank: Corporal
- Unit: 3rd U.S. Cavalry
- Conflicts: Indian Wars; Apache Wars
- Awards: Medal of Honor

Hermann Emil Fichter (March 30, 1845 – August 5, 1912) was an American soldier in the U.S. Army who served with the 3rd U.S. Cavalry during the Apache Wars. He was one of five men received the Medal of Honor for gallantry battling the Apache Indians in the Whetstone Mountains of Arizona on May 5, 1871.

== Biography ==
Hermann Emil Fichter was born in the Grand Duchy of Baden, Germany on March 30, 1845. He emigrated to the United States and enlisted in the U.S. Army in New York City, New York. He was assigned to frontier duty in the Arizona Territory with the 3rd U.S. Cavalry and took part in the Apache Wars. On May 5, 1871, Fichter was cited for "gallantry in action" while fighting the Apache in the Whetstone Mountains. He was one of five members of his regiment, including Sergeant John Mott, Private John Kilmartin, Private Daniel H. Miller and Private John P. Yount, to receive the Medal of Honor at the end of the year. After leaving the army, Fichter settled in Quincy, Illinois and died there on August 5, 1912, at the age of 67. He was interred at Saint Boniface Cemetery.

== Medal of Honor citation ==
Rank and organization: Private, Company F, 3d U.S. Cavalry. Place and date: At Whetstone Mountains, Ariz., May 5, 1871. Entered service at: ------. Birth: Germany. Date of issue: November 13, 1871.

Citation:

Gallantry in action.

== See also ==
- List of Medal of Honor recipients for the Indian Wars
