= William H. Folly =

American soldier

- Born: Bergen County, New Jersey, United States
- Military career
- Allegiance: United States of America
- Branch: United States Army
- Service years: c. 1868–1869
- Rank: Private
- Unit: 8th U.S. Cavalry
- Conflicts: Indian Wars; Apache Wars
- Awards: Medal of Honor

Private William H. Folly was an American soldier in the U.S. Army who served with the 8th U.S. Cavalry during the Apache Wars. He was one of thirty-four cavalry troopers who received the Medal of Honor for gallantry in several engagements against the Apache Indians in the Arizona Territory from August to October 1868.

== Biography ==
William H. Folly was born in Bergen County, New Jersey. He later enlisted in the U.S. Army as a private with Company B of the 8th U.S. Cavalry. Folly was assigned to frontier duty and saw action during the Apache Wars during the late-1860s. In the late summer and fall of 1868, Folly was among the 50-60 cavalrymen, mostly from Company B and L, ordered to protect settlers in the Arizona Territory from Apache raiding parties. He and his comrades frequently encountered the Apache during their patrols, often in ambushes or sniper attacks from hidden ravines, and won distinction in several of these battles during this 90-day period. On July 24, 1869, in one of the largest award presentations ever held at the time, Folly was among the thirty-four men in his regiment who received the Medal of Honor for "bravery in scouts and actions against Indians".

== Medal of Honor citation ==
Rank and organization: Private, Company B, 8th U.S. Cavalry. Place and date: Arizona, August to October 1868. Entered service at:------. Birth: Bergen County, N.J. Date of issue: July 24, 1869.

Citation:

Bravery in scouts and actions against Indians.

== See also ==
- List of Medal of Honor recipients for the Indian Wars
