= Michael O'Regan (soldier) =

American soldier in the United States Army

- Born: July 22, 1846; Fall River, Massachusetts, United States
- Died: May 28, 1933 (aged 86); Fall River, Massachusetts
- Burial place: Saint Patrick's Cemetery
- Military career
- Allegiance: United States of America
- Branch: United States Army
- Service years: c. 1868–1870
- Rank: Private
- Unit: 8th U.S. Cavalry
- Conflicts: Indian Wars; Apache Wars
- Awards: Medal of Honor

Private Michael O'Regan (July 22, 1846 – May 28, 1933) was an American soldier in the United States Army who served with the 8th U.S. Cavalry Regiment during the Apache Wars. O'Regan was one of several soldiers who received the Medal of Honor for gallantry in fighting Apache Indians in the Arizona Territory between August and October 1868.

== Biography ==
Michael O'Regan was born in Fall River, Massachusetts on July 22, 1846. He later enlisted in the United States Army in Boston, Massachusetts and joined Company B in the 8th U.S. Cavalry Regiment. A participant in the Apache Wars during the late 1860s, O'Regan was part of a small cavalry group of approximately fifty troopers tasked with protecting settlers from Apache raiding parties in the Arizona Territory between August and October 1868. During that ninety-day period, O'Regan and his colleagues faced the Apaches in heavy fighting, especially in ambushes and sniper attacks, during their patrols. O'Regan was among the thirty-four soldiers who received the Medal of Honor, in one of the U.S. Army's largest presentations of the medal at the time, for "bravery in scouts and actions against Indians" on July 25, 1869. O'Regan returned to Fall River after leaving the army and died on May 28, 1933, at the age of 86. He was interred in Saint Patrick's Cemetery.

== Medal of Honor citation ==
Rank and organization: Private, Company B, 8th U.S. Cavalry. Place and date: Arizona, August to October 1868. Entered service at:------. Birth: Fall River, Mass. Date of issue: 24 July 1869.

Citation:

Bravery in scouts and actions against Indians.

== See also ==
- List of Medal of Honor recipients for the Indian Wars
