= Abram B. Brant =

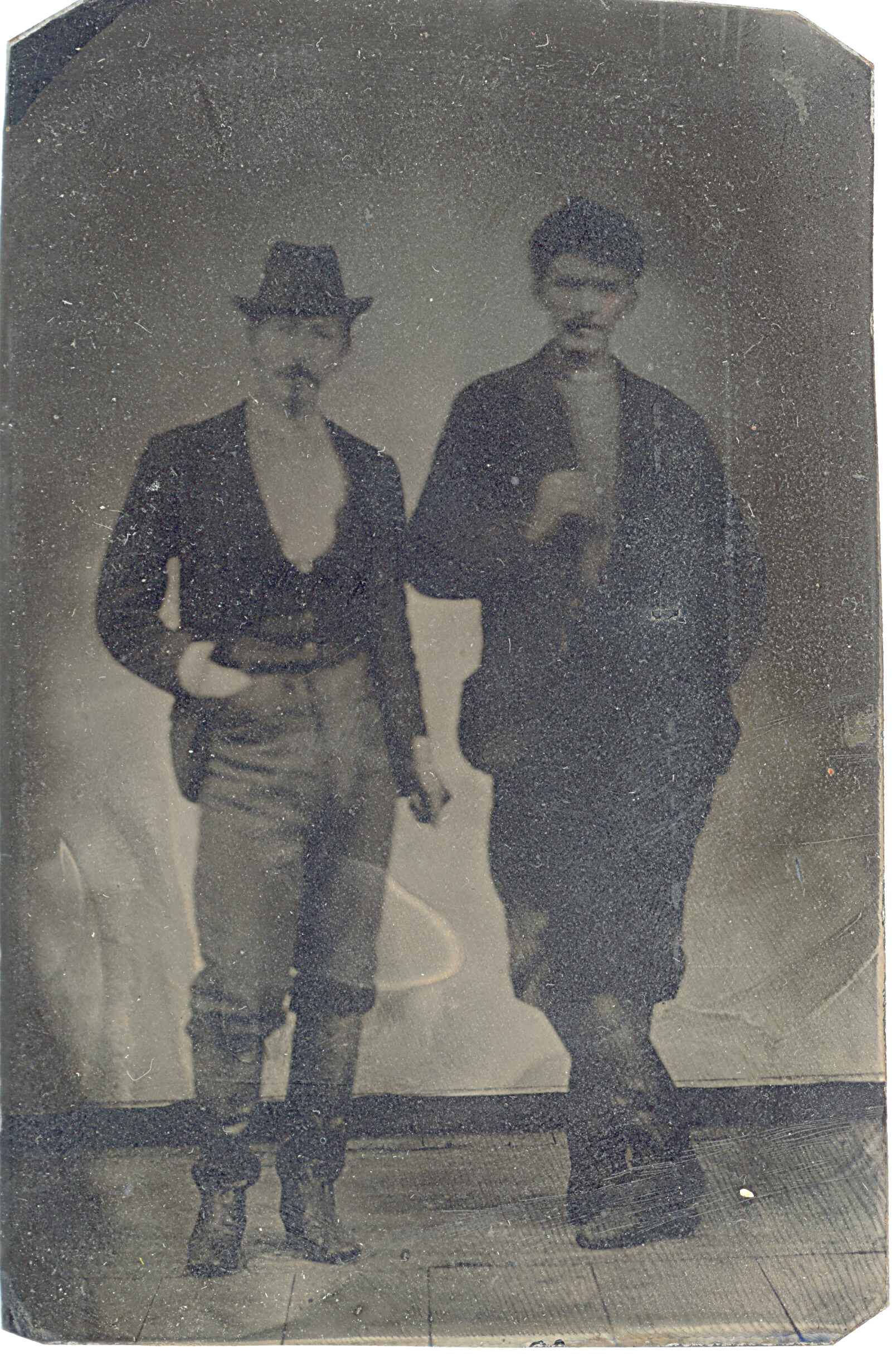
- Abram B. Brant (left) with an unnamed friend (1878)
- Born: 1849; New York City, New York
- Died: October 4, 1878 (aged 28–29); Camp Ruhlen, Dakota Territory
- Burial place: Fort Meade National Cemetery
- Military career
- Allegiance: United States
- Branch: Army
- Service years: 1876-1878
- Rank: Private
- Unit: 7th U.S. Cavalry
- Conflicts: Indian Wars; Battle of Little Bighorn
- Awards: Medal of Honor

Abram B. Brant (1849 - October 4, 1878) was a New York-born private in the 7th U.S. Cavalry and posthumously earned the Medal of Honor at the Battle of Little Bighorn on June 26, 1876. He later died the night before he was to receive the Medal of Honor after he accidentally shot himself while stationed in Dakota Territory.

== Biography ==
Abram B. Brant was born in New York City in 1849 and enlisted in the 7th U.S. Cavalry in the 1870s. During the second day of the Battle of Little Bighorn, he gave water to wounded soldiers while under heavy enemy fire. After the battle, he remained stationed in the Dakota territory for two years before his death on October 4, 1878, after he accidentally shot himself while passing his revolver to First Sergeant J.G. Sturgis at Camp Ruhlen. He was posthumously awarded with the Medal of Honor the following day on October 5, 1878.
