= Bernard McBride =

American soldier

- Born: c. 1845; Brrolyn, New York (state), United States
- Military career
- Allegiance: United States of America
- Branch: United States Army
- Service years: c. 1868–1870
- Rank: Private
- Unit: 8th U.S. Cavalry
- Conflicts: Indian Wars
- Awards: Medal of Honor

Bernard McBride (born c. 1845, date of death unknown) was an American soldier in the U.S. Army who served with the 8th U.S. Cavalry during the Indian Wars. He was one of 34 men received the Medal of Honor for "bravery in scouts and actions" in several engagements against the Apache Indians in the Arizona Territory from August to October 1868.

== Biography ==
Born in Brooklyn, New York (state) in about 1845, Bernard McBride enlisted in the U.S. Army in Washington, D.C. and was sent out west for frontier duty in the Arizona Territory. McBride served with the 8th U.S. Cavalry and, from August to October 1868, was part of a small force numbering 50-60 troopers assigned to protect settlements from Apache raiding parties. He and his fellow soldiers spent the next three months in heavy fighting with the Apache, most often in the form of ambushes and sniper attacks, during their patrols. He was among the 34 soldiers who were received the Medal of Honor, in one of the U.S. Army's largest Medal of Honor presentations at the time, for "bravery in scouts and actions against Indians" on July 24, 1869.

== Medal of Honor citation ==
Rank and organization: Private, Company B, 8th U.S. Cavalry. Place and date: Arizona, August to October 1868. Entered service at:------. Birth: Brooklyn, N.Y. Date of issue: 24 July 1869.

Citation:

Bravery in scouts and actions against Indians.

== See also ==
- List of Medal of Honor recipients
