= Lorenzo D. Brown =

US Army soldier

Lorenzo Dow Brown
- Born: December 1, 1851; Davidson County, North Carolina, US
- Died: April 17, 1906 (aged 54); Jonesboro, Arkansas, US
- Military career
- Allegiance: United States of America
- Branch: United States Army
- Rank: Private
- Unit: Company A 7th Infantry
- Conflicts: Indian Wars
- Awards: Medal of Honor

Lorenzo Dow Brown (December 1, 1851 – April 17, 1906) was a United States Army soldier who received the Medal of Honor during the Indian Wars for actions performed on August 9, 1977 during the Battle of the Big Hole in Montana. He was presented the Medal of Honor on May 8, 1878. He died on April 17, 1906 near Jonesboro, Arkansas. His place of burial is unknown.

== Medal of Honor citation ==
Citation

After having been severely wounded in right shoulder, continued to do duty in a most courageous manner.
