= Richard Longstreet Tea =

US Army Indian Wars Medal of Honor recipient (1840–1911)

- Born: February 20, 1840; Philadelphia, Pennsylvania, US
- Died: 14 September 1911 (aged 71); Prescott, Arizona, US
- Burial place: Mountain View Cemetery, Prescott, Arizona
- Military career
- Allegiance: United States; Union
- Branch: Union Army; United States Army
- Service years: 1858–1888
- Rank: Sergeant
- Units: Company H, 6th U.S. Cavalry
- Conflicts: American Civil War; Indian Wars
- Awards: Medal of Honor

Richard Longstreet Tea (February 20, 1840 – September 14, 1911) was an American soldier who received the Medal of Honor for heroism on April 23, 1875, during the Indian Wars. He was born in Philadelphia in February 1840. He enlisted at Philadelphia on February 1, 1858, just prior to his 18th birthday, with his father approving the enlistment and signing with an "x." He was sent West, where he protected the Pony Express before being sent East to fight in the Rebellion. He was assigned to Battery "B" of the Fourth U. S. Artillery. During the Rebellion, he was wounded at the Battle of Sharpsburg, wounded at the Battle of Spottsylvania, and shot in the abdomen, leg, mouth and stomach.

He married Margaret Graham on July 16, 1867, in Junction City, Kansas. They had one child, Annie M., born in 1872. He divorced Margaret Graham and then married Alice Grugan in Prescott, Arizona on February 13, 1887.

So conspicuous was his record as a soldier during that war that he was accorded the distinction by the United States Congress of being permitted to enter either the Senate Chambers or the floor of the House and enjoy any privilege of either. He and his wife were permitted to live on post after he retired in 1888, an honor accorded few service members.

Tea died in the arms of his wife on September 14, 1911, in Prescott, Arizona at Fort Whipple and was originally buried in the Fort Whipple Cemetery. Later he was disinterred and re-buried in Mountain View Cemetery. His grave can be found in Section P, Lot 13, Grave D, next to the grave of his wife Alice Tea.

== Medal of Honor citation ==
Rank and organization: Sergeant, Company H, 6th U.S. Cavalry. Place and date: At Sappa Creek, Kans., 23 April 1875. Entered service at: – Birth: Philadelphia, Pa. Date of issue: 16 November 1876.

Citation:

With 5 other men he waded in mud and water up the creek to a position directly behind an entrenched Cheyenne position, who were using natural bank pits to good advantage against the main column. This surprise attack from the enemy rear broke their resistance.

== See also ==
- List of Medal of Honor recipients
