= List of Medal of Honor recipients educated at the United States Military Academy =

The earliest Medal of Honor recipient educated at the United States Military Academy was John Cleveland Robinson, a non-graduating member of the class of 1839. The first alumnus of the United States Military Academy (USMA) to perform actions to be recognized with the Medal of Honor was Charles Henry Tompkins, a non-graduating member of the class of 1851, while the last alumnus to perform actions so recognized is Nicholas Dockery, a graduating member of the class of 2011.

There are ten wars involving the United States for which the Medal of Honor has been bestowed upon a USMA alumnus. More than half of the alumni who received the distinction were thereby recognized for actions in either the American Civil War or the American Indian Wars; twenty-five alumni were awarded the medal in connection with the Civil War and twenty-one in connection with the Indian Wars. Four alumni were recognized for their contributions to the Spanish–American War, nine for the Philippine–American War, two for the Boxer Rebellion, and one for the Banana Wars. While only one alumnus received the Medal of Honor for actions in World War I, ten alumni were so recognized for actions in World War II. Other 20th Century conflicts for which the Medal of Honor was given to USMA alumni are the Korean War, for which two alumni were recognized, and the Vietnam War, for which eight alumni were recognized. The latest conflict for which the Medal of Honor has been awarded to a USMA alumni is the War in Afghanistan, for which one alumnus has been recognized.

Of the eighty-four USMA alumni who have received the Medal of Honor, eight were non-graduates: John Cleveland Robinson, Charles Henry Tompkins, John Alexander Logan, Jr., Louis J. Van Schaick, Eli Thompson Fryer, Michael J. Daly, Roger Donlon, and James A. Gardner. Two graduates, John Gregory Bourke (class of 1869) and Calvin Pearl Titus (class of 1905), received the Medal of Honor before being appointed to the academy. Other notable Academy alumni who received the Medal of Honor include William Harding Carter, Douglas MacArthur, and Humbert Roque Versace.

== Medal of Honor recipients ==
Note: "Class year" refers to the alumnus's class year, which usually is the same year they graduated. However, in times of war, classes often graduate early.
ex: after the class year indicates the alumni is a non-graduating member of that class.

=== American Civil War ===
All of the USMA alumni who received the Medal of Honor for action in the American Civil War were part of the Union Army fighting against the Confederate States Army to undo the secession of the Confederate States of America. The Civil War was the first war for which the Medal of Honor was granted, and more USMA alumni received this honor for participation in the Civil War than for any other conflict. Of the 3464 American Civil War Medal of Honor recipients, 25 attended USMA.

Name	Class year	Notability	References
John Cleveland Robinson	1839 ex	Left the academy after three years but joined the army one year later; major general in the American Civil War; awarded the MOH for valor in action in 1864 near Spotsylvania Courthouse, Virginia; Lieutenant Governor of New York (1873–1874); served two terms as the president of the Grand Army of the Republic	
John Porter Hatch	1845	Major general; fought in the Mexican War where he was breveted twice for bravery in battle; awarded the MOH for bravery at the Battle of South Mountain during the Maryland Campaign where he was wounded and had two mounts shot from underneath him; later served on the western frontier; retired to New York City and was awarded the Medal of Honor in 1893	
Orlando B. Wilcox	1847	Major general; awarded the MOH in 1895 for gallantry at the First Battle of Bull Run where he was captured; later released as part of a prisoner exchange and served in the Virginia and North Carolina theaters at the end of the war	
Absalom Baird	1849	Major general; attended Washington & Jefferson College before graduating from West Point; earned fame for actions at the Chickamauga, Chattanooga, and Jonesborough; received the MOH in 1896 for his actions at Jonesborough; later received the French Légion d'honneur	
Rufus Saxton	1849	Major general; recipient of the MOH for his defense at the Battle of Harpers Ferry; participated in the Pacific Railroad surveys in 1853; early abolitionist	
Eugene Asa Carr	1850	Major general; recipient of the MOH for his defensive though wounded several times at the Battle of Pea Ridge	
Charles Henry Tompkins	1851 ex	Dropped out of the academy after two years for unspecified reasons; brigadier general; recipient of the MOH for twice charging through the enemy's lines on 1 July 1861 near Fairfax, Virginia, making him the first Union officer of the Civil War to receive the Medal of Honor	
David S. Stanley	1852	Major general; recipient of the MOH for his actions organizing a counterattack at the Second Battle of Franklin, commander of the IV Corps	
John Schofield	1853	Lieutenant general; recipient of the Medal of Honor for his actions leading an attack at the Battle of Wilson's Creek, Atlanta campaign, Battle of Franklin, Battle of Nashville, Battle of Wyse Fork; commander of the Army of the Frontier, division commander in the XIV Corps; United States Secretary of War (1868–1869); superintendent of the academy (1876–1881); Commanding General of the United States Army (1888–1895); Military Governor of Virginia	
Zenas Bliss	1854	Major general; recipient of the MOH for his actions at the Battle of Fredericksburg; formed the first unit of Seminole-Negro Indian Scouts	
Oliver Duff Greene	1854	Colonel; recipient of the MOH for his actions at the Battle of Antietam	
Oliver Otis Howard	1854	Major general; recipient of the MOH for his actions leading an attack at the Battle of Seven Pines despite wound which resulted in the loss of his right arm; led the campaign against Chief Joseph and the Nez Perce tribe; founder of Howard University; superintendent of the academy (1881–1882)	
Alexander S. Webb	1855	Major general; recipient of the MOH for his actions at the Battle of Gettysburg for personal bravery and leadership repulsing Pickett's Charge; president of the City College of New York (1869–1902)	
Abraham Arnold	1859	Brigadier general; recipient of the MOH for leading a cavalry charge against superior forces	
Horace Porter	1860	Brigadier general; recipient of the MOH for his actions at the Battle of Chickamauga; United States Ambassador to France (1897–1905)	
John Moulder Wilson	1860	Brigadier general; recipient of the MOH for his actions at the Battle of Malvern Hill despite acute illness; superintendent of the academy (1889–1893); Chief of Engineers (1897–1901)	
Adelbert Ames	1861 (May)	Major general; recipient of the MOH for his continuing a fierce fight though severely wounded in his right thigh at First Battle of Bull Run; Governor of Mississippi (1868–1870) and (1874–1876); United States Senator from Mississippi (1870–1874)	
Eugene B. Beaumont	1861 (May)	Lieutenant colonel; recipient of the MOH for two separate actions at the Harpeth River in Tennessee and the Battle of Selma in Alabama	
Samuel Nicholl Benjamin	1861 (May)	Major; recipient of the MOH for actions as an artillery officer	
Henry Algernon du Pont	1861 (May)	Lieutenant colonel; recipient of the MOH for actions repulsing an enemy attack at the Battle of Cedar Creek; United States Senator from Delaware (1906–1917)	
Guy Vernor Henry	1861 (May)	Major general; recipient of the MOH for actions repulsing an enemy attack at the Battle of Cold Harbor; son Major General Guy Vernor Henry Jr. is an Academy alumnus, class of 1894; Governor of Puerto Rico (1898–1899)	
Alonzo Cushing	1861 (June)	First lieutenant; posthumous recipient of the MOH for actions at Cemetery Ridge during the Battle of Gettysburg; his medal was not awarded until over 150 years after his death.	
George Lewis Gillespie, Jr.	1862	Major general; recipient of the MOH for carrying dispatches under withering fire at the Battle of Cold Harbor; Chief of Engineers (1901–1904)	
William Sully Beebe	1863	Major; recipient of the MOH for actions during an assault on a fortified position	
William Henry Harrison Benyaurd	1863	Lieutenant colonel; recipient of the MOH for actions during reconnaissance and rallying his troops	
John Gregory Bourke	1869	Captain at time of retirement, private at the time of the Medal of Honor action; recipient of the MOH for gallantry in action at the Battle of Stones River, Tennessee; prolific diarist and author focusing on the Old West	

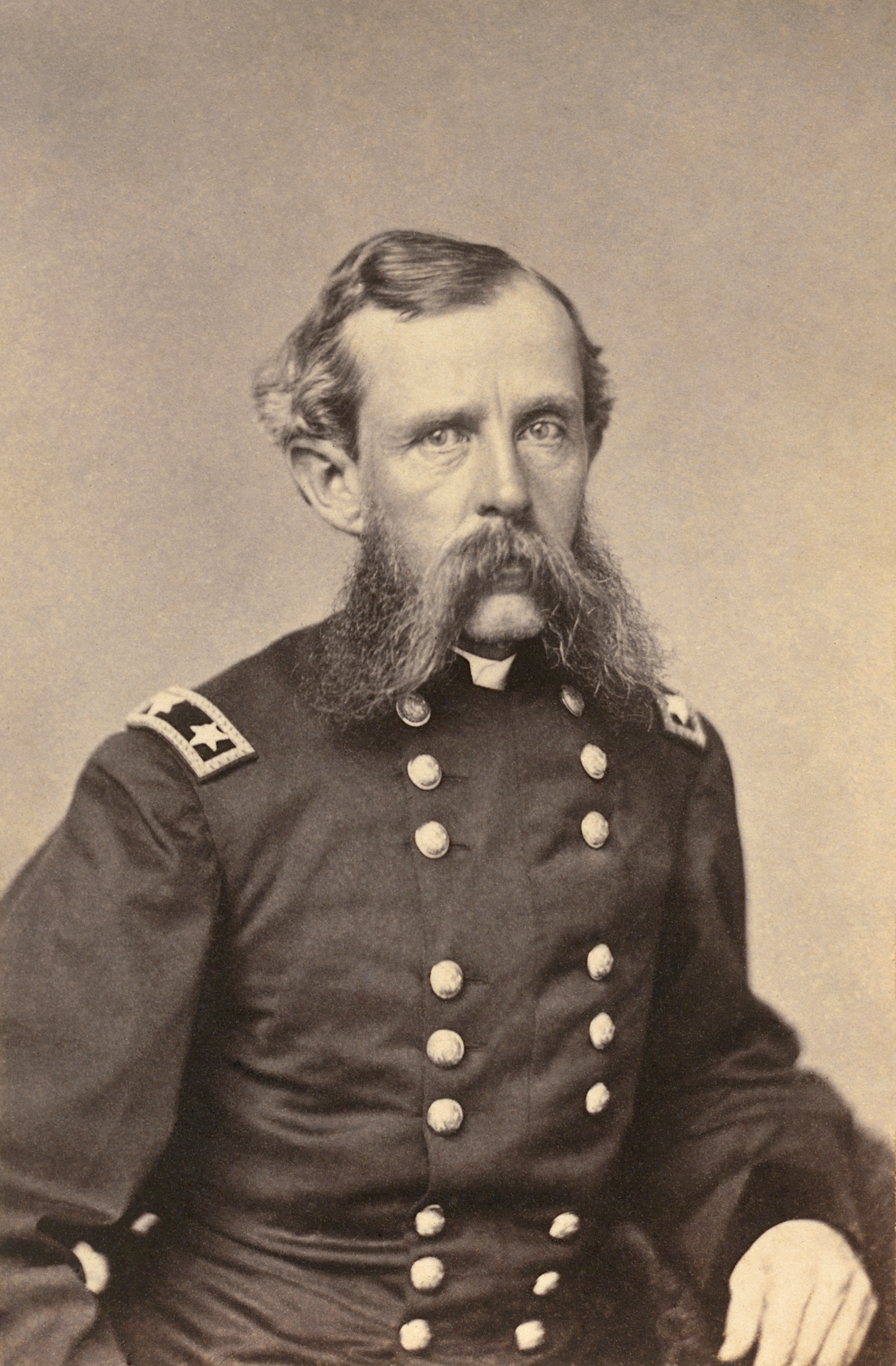
Absalom Baird

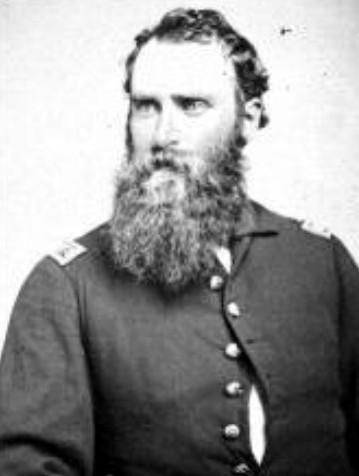
Charles Henry Tompkins

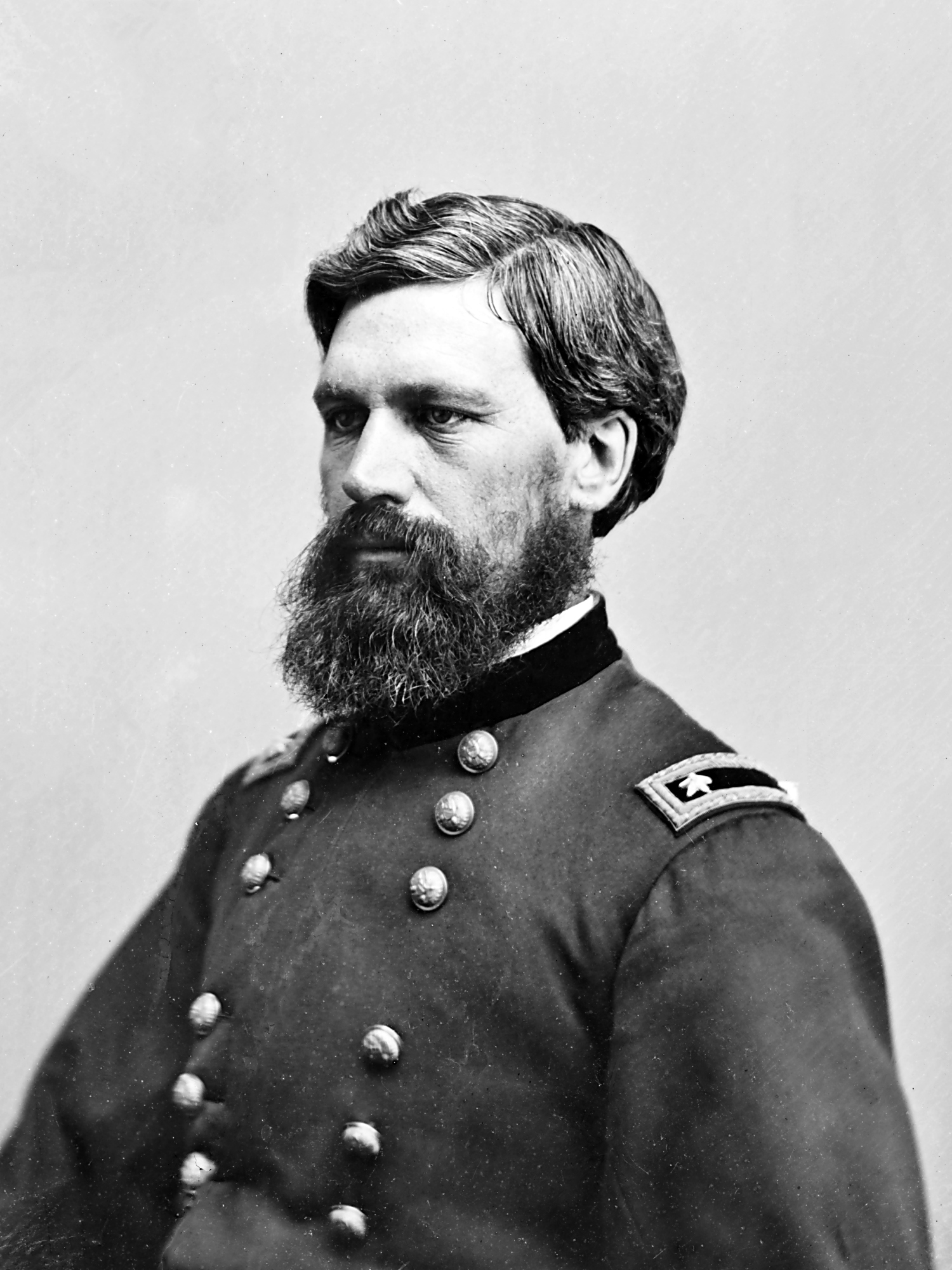
Oliver Howard

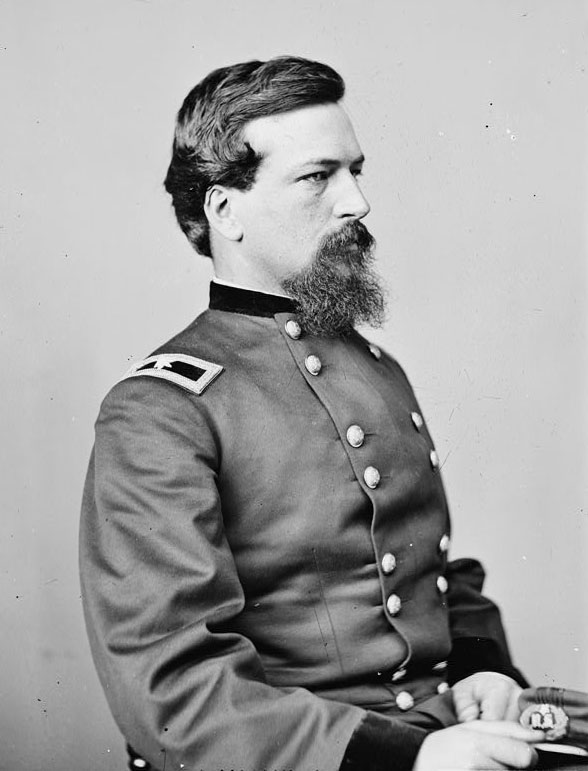
Alexander Webb

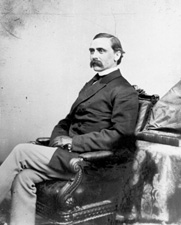
Adelbert Ames

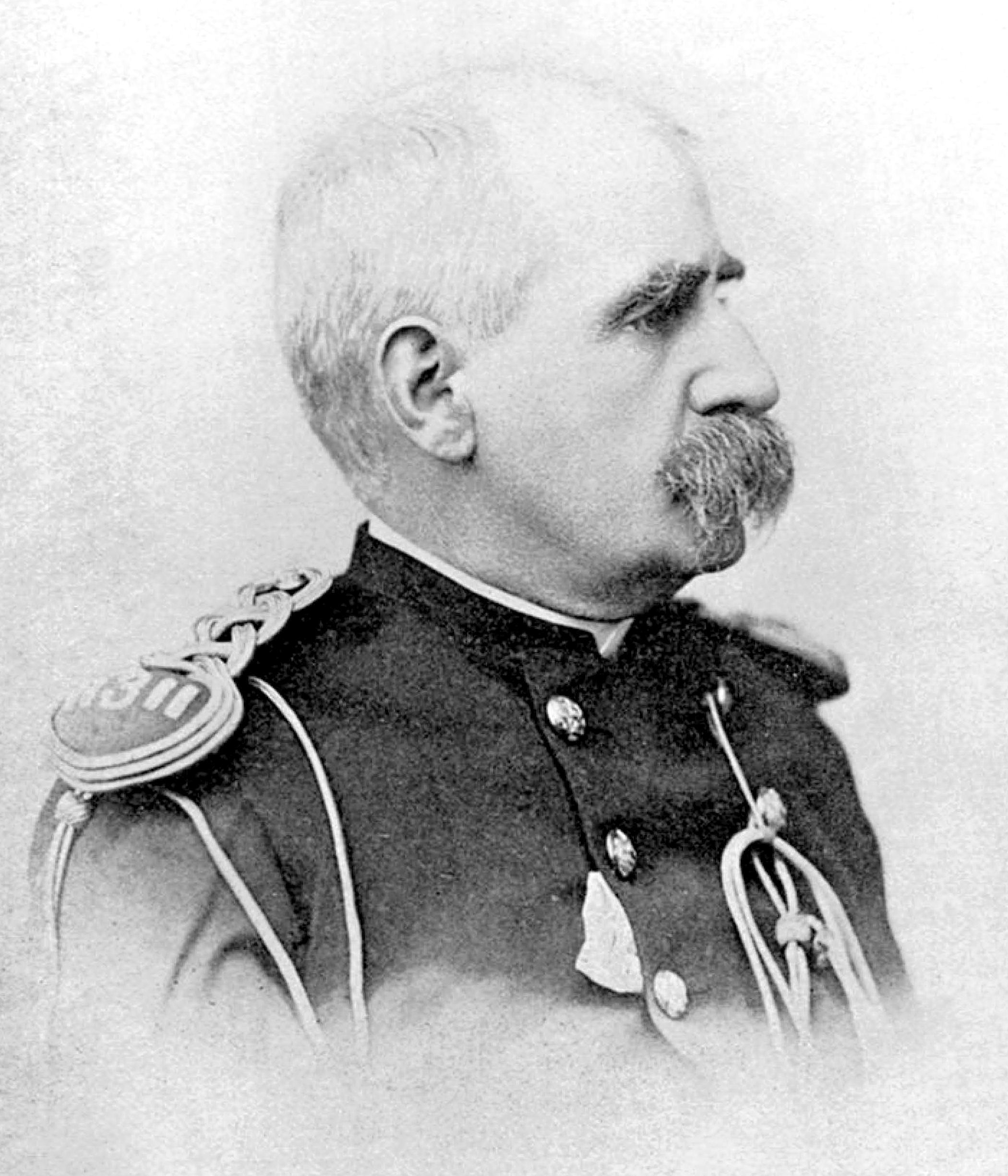
John Bourke

=== American Indian Wars ===
The USMA alumni receiving the Medal of Honor for their efforts in the American Indian Wars fought against the Native Americans in the United States in order to expand the territory controlled by American settlers and the federal government of the United States. Among the American Indian Wars Medal of Honor recipients, 21 were USMA alumni.

Name	Class year	Notability	References
Edward Settle Godfrey	1867	Brigadier general; a private during the Civil War before attending West Point; received the MOH for leading his men against Chief Joseph despite being severely wounded; led two platoons of Medal of Honor men at the burial of the Unknown Soldier from World War I	
William Preble Hall	1868	Brigadier general; received the MOH for leading a small group to rescue an officer surrounded by 35 enemy; distinguished marksman with rifle and revolver	
Robert Goldthwaite Carter	1870	First lieutenant; an enlisted soldier during the Civil War before attending West Point; received the MOH for repulsing the charge of a large hostile Indian force near the Brazos River in 1871	
John Brown Kerr	1870	Brigadier general; received the MOH for actions against Brule Sioux along the White River, South Dakota	
Edward John McClernand	1870	Brigadier general; received the MOH for actions at Bear Paw Mountain, Montana in 1877 against Chief Joseph's tribe	
Charles Varnum	1872	Colonel; commander of the scouts for George Armstrong Custer in the Little Bighorn Campaign during the Black Hills War; recipient of the MOH for his actions in a conflict following the Battle of Wounded Knee	
Frank West	1872	Colonel; recipient of the MOH for rallying his men against a fortified position at the Battle of Big Dry Wash, Arizona, for which three other men also received the Medal of Honor: Thomas Cruse, George H. Morgan, and Charles Taylor	
William Harding Carter	1873	Major general; recipient of the MOH for rescuing two soldiers under heavy fire during the Comanche Campaign	
Marion Perry Maus	1874	Brigadier general; recipient of the MOH for actions while commander of Apache scouts in the capture of Geronimo	
Ernest Albert Garlington	1876	Brigadier general; recipient of the MOH for gallantry at the Battle of Wounded Knee	
John Chowning Gresham	1876	Colonel; recipient of the MOH for gallantry at the Battle of Wounded Knee	
Oscar Fitzalan Long	1876	Brigadier general; recipient of the MOH for leadership under heavy fire at Bear Paw Mountain, Montana	
Matthias W. Day	1877	Colonel; recipient of the MOH for rescuing a wounded soldier under heavy fire after being ordered to retreat; member of the 9th Cavalry Regiment of the Buffalo Soldiers	
Robert Temple Emmet	1877	Colonel; recipient of the MOH for holding off 200 enemies with only himself and five men despite being surrounded; member of the 9th Cavalry Regiment of the Buffalo Soldiers	
Wilber Elliott Wilder	1877	Brigadier general; recipient of the MOH for rescuing a wounded soldier under heavy fire; key figure in negotiating the surrender of the Apache chief Geronimo	
Lloyd Milton Brett	1879	Brigadier general; recipient of the MOH for fearless exposure in cutting off the enemy's pony herd at O'Fallon's Creek, Montana, which greatly crippled their ability to fight	
Thomas Cruse	1879	Brigadier general; recipient of the MOH for holding off the enemy, which enabled the rescue of wounded soldier at the Battle of Big Dry Wash, Arizona, for which three other men also received the Medal of Honor: Frank West, George H. Morgan, and Charles Taylor	
George Ritter Burnett	1880	First lieutenant; recipient of the MOH for rescuing stranded men under heavy enemy fire; one of his men, Augustus Walley, also received the Medal of Honor for this action, both members of the 9th Cavalry Regiment of the Buffalo Soldiers	
George Horace Morgan	1880	Colonel; recipient of the MOH for steadfastly holding his line against the enemy at the Battle of Big Dry Wash, Arizona, for which three other men also received the Medal of Honor: Thomas Cruse, Frank West, and Charles Taylor	
Powhatan Henry Clarke	1884	First lieutenant; recipient of the MOH for saving a wounded man under heavy fire; later drowned while rescuing another man	
Robert Lee Howze	1888	Major general; recipient of the MOH for bravery in action; once threatened to dismiss an entire class of plebes (freshmen) from the academy for hazing; presided over the court-martial of Brigadier general Billy Mitchell	

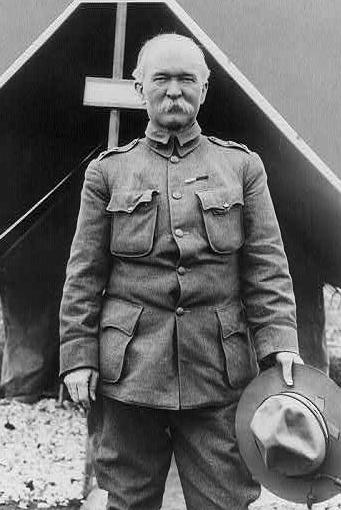
William Carter

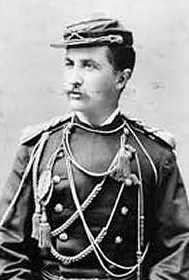
Oscar Long

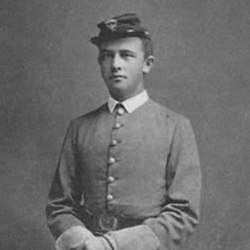
Matthias Day

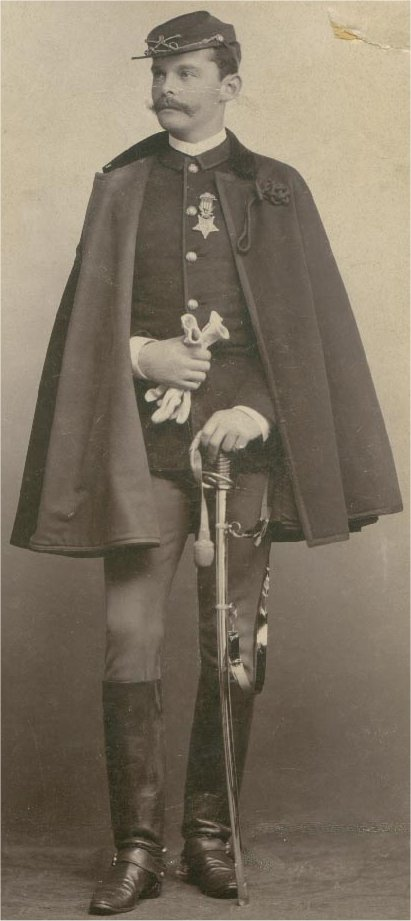
Powhatan Clarke wearing his Medal of Honor

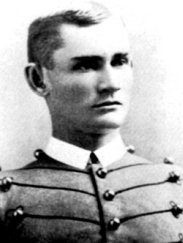
Robert Howze

=== Spanish–American War ===
The Medal of Honor was given to Americans who fought in the Spanish–American War against Spain under the Restoration during the Cuban War of Independence. Four USMA alumni were among the Spanish–American War Medal of Honor recipients.

Name	Class year	Notability	References
Albert Leopold Mills	1879	Major general; recipient of the MOH for continuing to lead his men at the Battle of San Juan Hill despite being shot in the head and temporarily blinded; superintendent of the academy (1898–1906)	
John W. Heard	1883	Brigadier general; recipient of the MOH for repulsing an attack by a larger force while his unit was unloading supplies from a river boat	
Charles DuVal Roberts	1897	Brigadier general; recipient of the MOH for assisting a wounded man under heavy fire	
Ira C. Welborn	1898	Colonel; recipient of the MOH for assisting a wounded man under heavy fire	

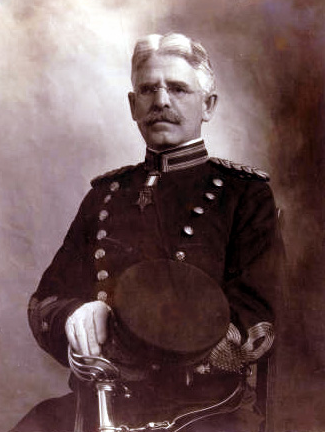
Albert Mills

=== Philippine–American War ===
USMA alumni who received the Medal of Honor for participating in the Philippine–American War fought against the First Philippine Republic, the Katipunan, the Pulahan, the Sultanate of Sulu, and the Moro people in order to suppress the Philippine Declaration of Independence. Nine USMA alumni were among the 86 men who received the medal for their involvement in this war.

Name	Class year	Notability	References
William Edward Birkhimer	1870	Brigadier general; awarded the MOH for taking control of a bridge by charging and routing 300 of the enemy with 12 men	
James Parker	1876	Major general; awarded the MOH for leadership of his men by repulsing a nighttime attack by a much larger enemy force	
James Franklin Bell	1878	Major general; began his career with the 9th Cavalry Regiment, a black unit; awarded the MOH for attacking seven enemy soldiers alone	
Hugh J. McGrath	1880	Major; awarded the MOH for actions against the enemy at a cave	
William Hampden Sage	1882	Brigadier general; awarded the MOH for swimming the San Juan River in the face of the enemy's fire and drove him from his entrenchment	
John A. Logan, Jr.	1887 ex	Major; awarded the MOH for actions while leading his small unit in an attack against a much larger enemy force	
Louis Joseph Van Schaick	1900 ex	Colonel; awarded the MOH for cavalry actions against hostile forces in a canyon	
Arthur Harrison Wilson	1904	Colonel; awarded the MOH for actions against hostile Moros	
John Thomas Kennedy	1908	Brigadier general; awarded the MOH for actions against the enemy at a cave	

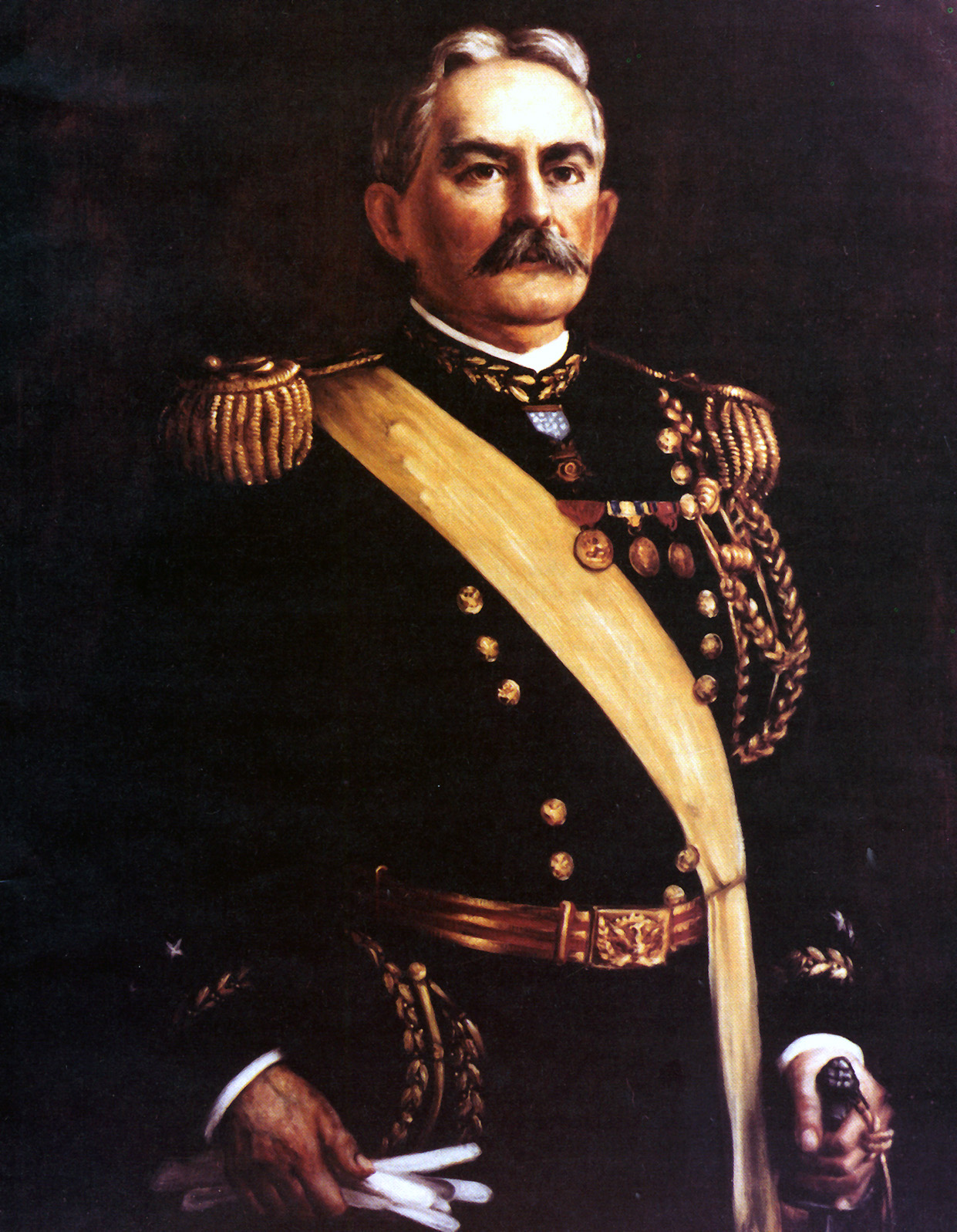
James Franklin Bell

=== Boxer Rebellion ===
The Medal of Honor was given to two USMA alumni who fought in the Boxer Rebellion in China against the Righteous Harmony Society of the Qing Dynasty in order to defend foreigners and Christians in China. Another 57 Americans received the Medal of Honor for participating in this conflict.

Name	Class year	Notability	References
Louis Bowem Lawton	1893	Major; recipient of the MOH for actions in combat despite being wounded three times	
Calvin Pearl Titus	1905	Lieutenant colonel at time of retirement, private at the time of the Medal of Honor action; admitted to the academy because of his Medal of Honor during the Boxer Rebellion; became a Chaplain's assistant	

=== Banana Wars ===
Eli Thompson Fryer is the sole USMA alumnus to have received the Medal of Honor for his involvement in the Banana Wars, supporting the United States occupation of Veracruz. All of the 62 other Americans who received the Medal of Honor for fighting in the Banana Wars were involved specifically in the occupation of Veracruz.

Name	Class year	Notability	References
Eli Thompson Fryer	1901 ex	Brigadier general; recipient of the MOH for actions as a Marine company commander during the occupation of Vera Cruz	

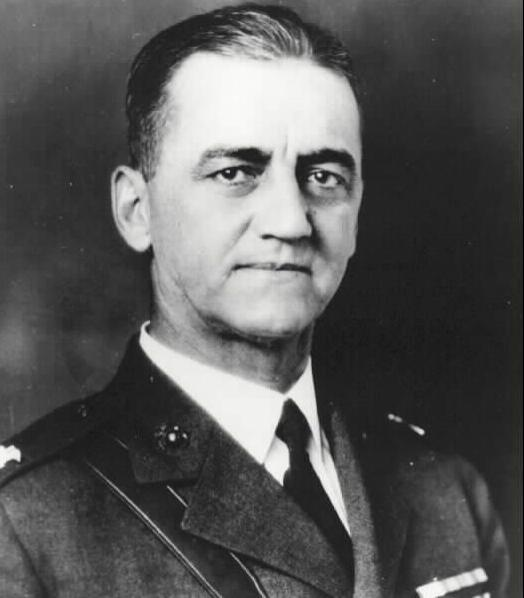
Eli T. Fryer

=== World War I ===
The United States' involvement in World War I was as a neutral party for most of the war, but included the deployment of expeditionary forces towards the end of the war. Of the 119 Americans who received the Medal of Honor for action in World War I, only one attended USMA: Emory Jenison Pike.

Name / Class year / Notability / References; Emory Jenison Pike / 1901 / Lieutenant colonel; recipient of the MOH for actions in combat organizing and leading units during heavy shelling despite being mortally wounded

=== World War II ===
At the beginning of World War II, the United States was a neutral party just as it was at the beginning of World War I. Unlike in World War I, however, the United States was involved in World War II in a military capacity for most of the war. Ten of the 464 men who received the Medal of Honor for action in World War II were educated at USMA.

Name	Class year	Notability	References
Douglas MacArthur	1903	General of the Army, field marshal in the Philippine Army; United States occupation of Veracruz; Second Battle of the Marne, Battle of Saint-Mihiel, Meuse-Argonne Offensive during World War I; commander of the 42nd Infantry Division; Superintendent of the United States Military Academy (1919–1922); brigade commander in the Philippine Division; commander of the Philippine Department; Chief of Staff of the United States Army (1930–1935); recipient of the Medal of Honor for actions during the Battle of Bataan, commander of the South West Pacific Area during World War II; Supreme Commander of the Allied Powers during the Occupation of Japan; Korean War; grandson of Wisconsin Governor Arthur MacArthur, Sr.; son of Lieutenant General and Medal of Honor recipient Arthur MacArthur, Jr.	
Jonathan Mayhew Wainwright IV	1906	General; recipient of the MOH for defense of te Bataan and Corregidor; also noted for leadership while a prisoner of war (POW); present on board USS Missouri (BB-63) for the surrender of Japan; returned to the Philippines to accept surrender of the local Japanese commander; his father, Robert Powell Page Wainwright, was member of the academy class of 1875	
William H. Wilbur	1912	Brigadier general; recipient of the MOH for actions during the Allied landings in North Africa while attempting to negotiate a cease fire and leading combat actions against hostile forces	
Demas T. Craw	1924	Colonel, United States Army Air Forces; posthumous recipient of the MOH for ground actions during the Allied landings in North Africa while attempting to negotiate a cease fire	
Leon William Johnson	1926	General, United States Army Air Corps and United States Air Force; recipient of the MOH for actions in aerial combat during the raid on the Ploesti, Romania oilfields	
Frederick Walker Castle	1930	Brigadier general, United States Army Air Forces; posthumous recipient of the MOH for actions in aerial combat while leading a bombing mission over Belgium	
Robert G. Cole	1939	Lieutenant colonel; 502nd Infantry Regiment, 101st Airborne Division; recipient of the MOH for leading his battalion in a bayonet charge at Carentan, France, during the Battle of Normandy; later killed in Best, Netherlands	
Leon Robert Vance, Jr.	1939	Lieutenant colonel, United States Army Air Corps; recipient of the MOH for actions in saving his bomber crew though he was severely wounded; Vance Air Force Base in his hometown of Enid, Oklahoma is named in his honor	
Alexander R. Nininger	1941	Second lieutenant; recipient of the MOH for actions in Bataan, Philippines while a member of the Philippine Scouts, continued an attack even though wounded three times; first Army soldier awarded the Medal of Honor in World War II; First Division of Cadet Barracks at West Point is named in his honor	
Michael J. Daly	1945 ex	Captain; dropped out of the academy after one year to enlist so he could fight in World War II; received a battlefield commission; awarded the MOH for assaulting several enemy positions	

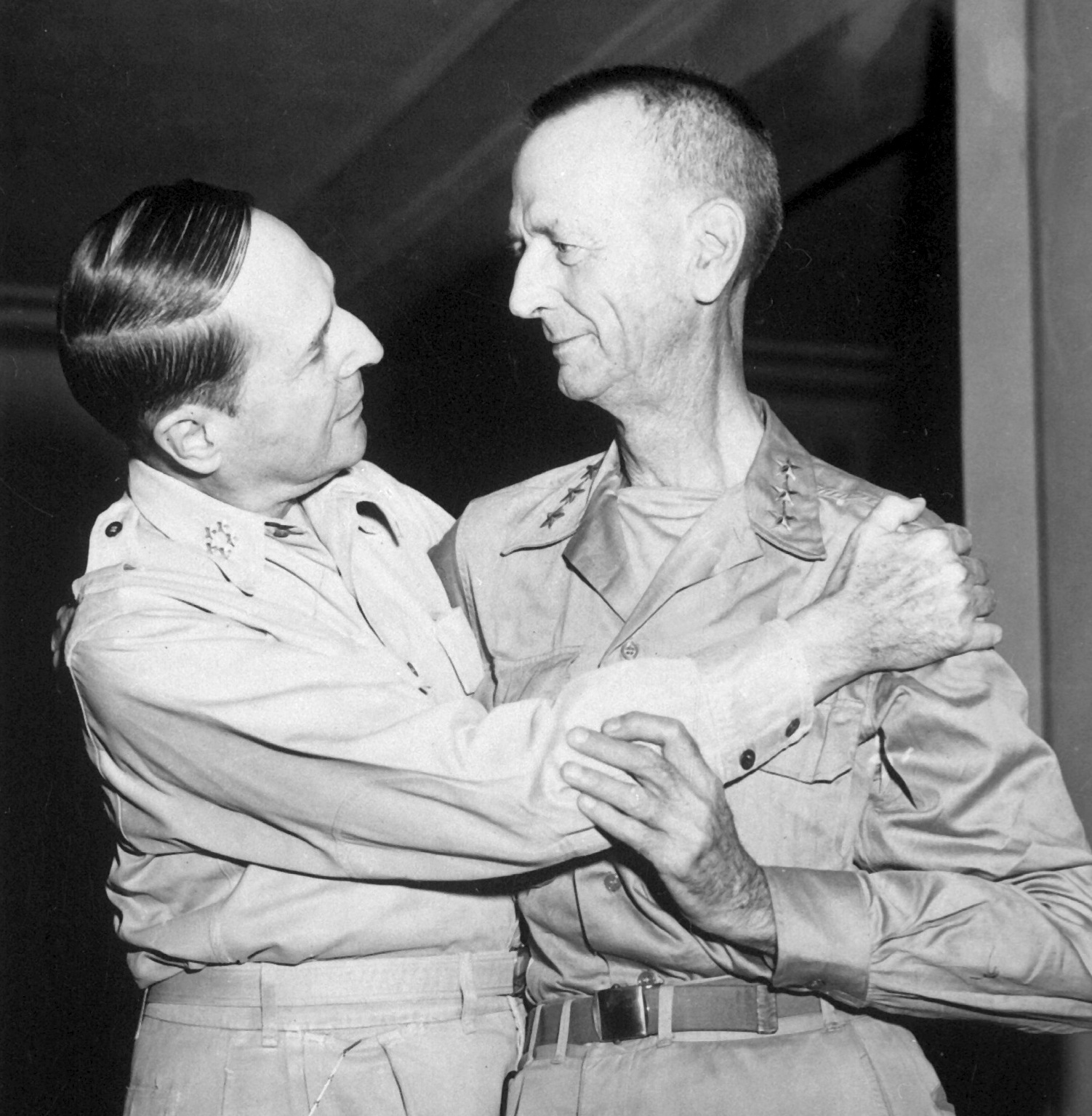
Two Medal of Honor recipients and friends, MacArthur (l) and Wainwright (r), greet at the end of the war. Wainwright was just released from POW camp

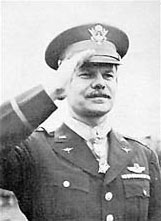
Leon Johnson, at his Medal of Honor ceremony with the medal around his neck

=== Korean War ===
The United States and twenty other member states of the United Nations supported South Korea in repelling an invasion by North Korea and its allies into South Korea. For their involvement, 134 Americans were presented with the Medal of Honor, three of whom attended USMA.

Name	Class year	Notability	References
Samuel S. Coursen	1949	First lieutenant; recipient of the MOH for actions while helping rescue a wounded man and eliminating an enemy roadblock	
Ralph Puckett	1949	First Lieutenant. Originally awarded the Distinguished Service Cross for his actions on November 25, 1950, when his company of 51 Rangers was attacked by several hundred Chinese soldiers at the battle for Hill 205. In April 2021, Puckett's Distinguished Service Cross for his actions on November 25, 1950, was upgraded to the Medal of Honor. He received the award from President Joe Biden during a ceremony at the White House on May 21, 2021. He is the last surviving Medal of Honor recipient of the Korean War, since the death of Hiroshi Miyamura on November 29, 2022. Retired as a Colonel.	
Richard Thomas Shea, Jr.	1952	First lieutenant; recipient of the MOH for actions while leading a counterattack against a larger enemy force	

=== Vietnam War ===
The United States and other anti-communist countries fought against North Vietnam and its communist allies during the Vietnam War in an attempt to prevent the communist takeover of South Vietnam and, more broadly, to implement the United States' policy of containment to prevent the spread of communism. Eight of the 246 men who received the Medal of Honor for fighting in this war attended USMA.

Name	Class year	Notability	References
William Atkinson Jones, III	1945	Colonel, United States Air Force; recipient of the MOH for actions while helping rescue a downed pilot	
Andre Lucas	1954	Lieutenant colonel; recipient of the MOH for repulsing a much larger force over a 23-day period	
Roger Donlon	1959 ex	Dropped out of the academy for personal reasons; captain, later colonel; recipient of the MOH for repulsing a much larger force	
Humbert Roque Versace	1959	Captain; recipient of the MOH for his resistance to Viet Cong indoctrination efforts while a prisoner of war (POW); his struggle was chronicled in length by fellow POW Nick Rowe in the book Five Years to Freedom.	
Frank S. Reasoner	1962	First lieutenant, United States Marine Corps; recipient of the MOH for actions leading reconnaissance patrol against a larger force and trying to save a wounded man	
Robert F. Foley	1963	Captain, later lieutenant general; recipient of the MOH for actions on 11 November 1966 for rallying his unit in the face of superior enemy numbers and personally destroying three enemy strongpoints; West Point Commandant of Cadets (1996–1998); later president of Marion Military Institute; currently the director of the Army Emergency Relief Program	
James A. Gardner	1965 ex	Did not graduate; first lieutenant; recipient of the MOH for actions leading his platoon in the relief of a company that was engaged with a larger enemy force	
Paul William Bucha	1965	Captain; recipient of the MOH for actions leading his unit against a larger enemy for in Binh Duong Province, Vietnam; foreign policy adviser to Barack Obama's 2008 presidential campaign	

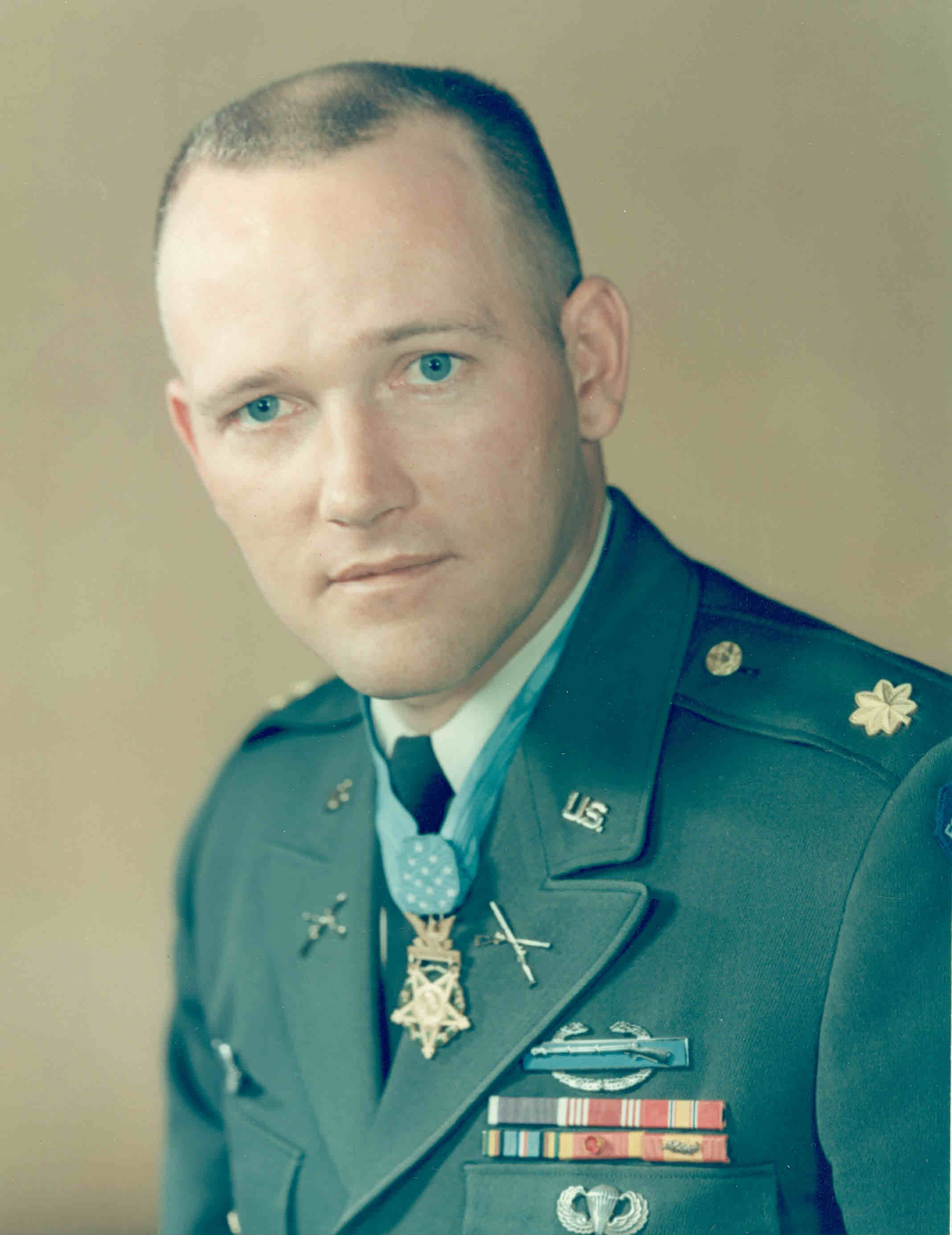
Roger Donlon

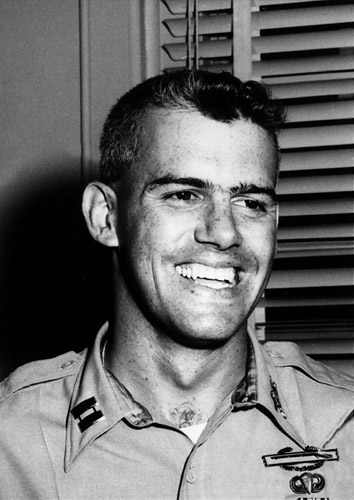
Rocky Versace

=== War in Afghanistan ===
Following the September 11 attacks, the United States and its allies invaded Afghanistan in 2001 to dismantle al-Qaeda and remove the Taliban government that had provided it sanctuary. The conflict evolved into a prolonged counterinsurgency as coalition and Afghan government forces fought the resurgent Taliban and other militant groups. The war lasted nearly 20 years, becoming the longest war in United States military history, and ended in 2021 with the withdrawal of U.S. forces and the Taliban's return to power. Of the U.S. service members awarded the Medal of Honor for actions during the war in Afghanistan, one USMA graduate, Nicholas Dockery, received the award.

Name	Class year	Notability	References
Nicholas Dockery	2011	Second Lieutenant; On October 2, 2012, Dockery's unit was ambushed in Kapisa provice. Engaging the Taliban forces that attacked the unit, he rallied American and Afghans in the fight. He then went to the aid of a wounded American, consolidated his allies, used his body to shield an ally from an exploding grenade, and rescued an unconscious ally from being taken by the Taliban. After, he exposed himself to direct gunships to provide suppressive fire upon Taliban forces. Retired as a Major in 2026.	

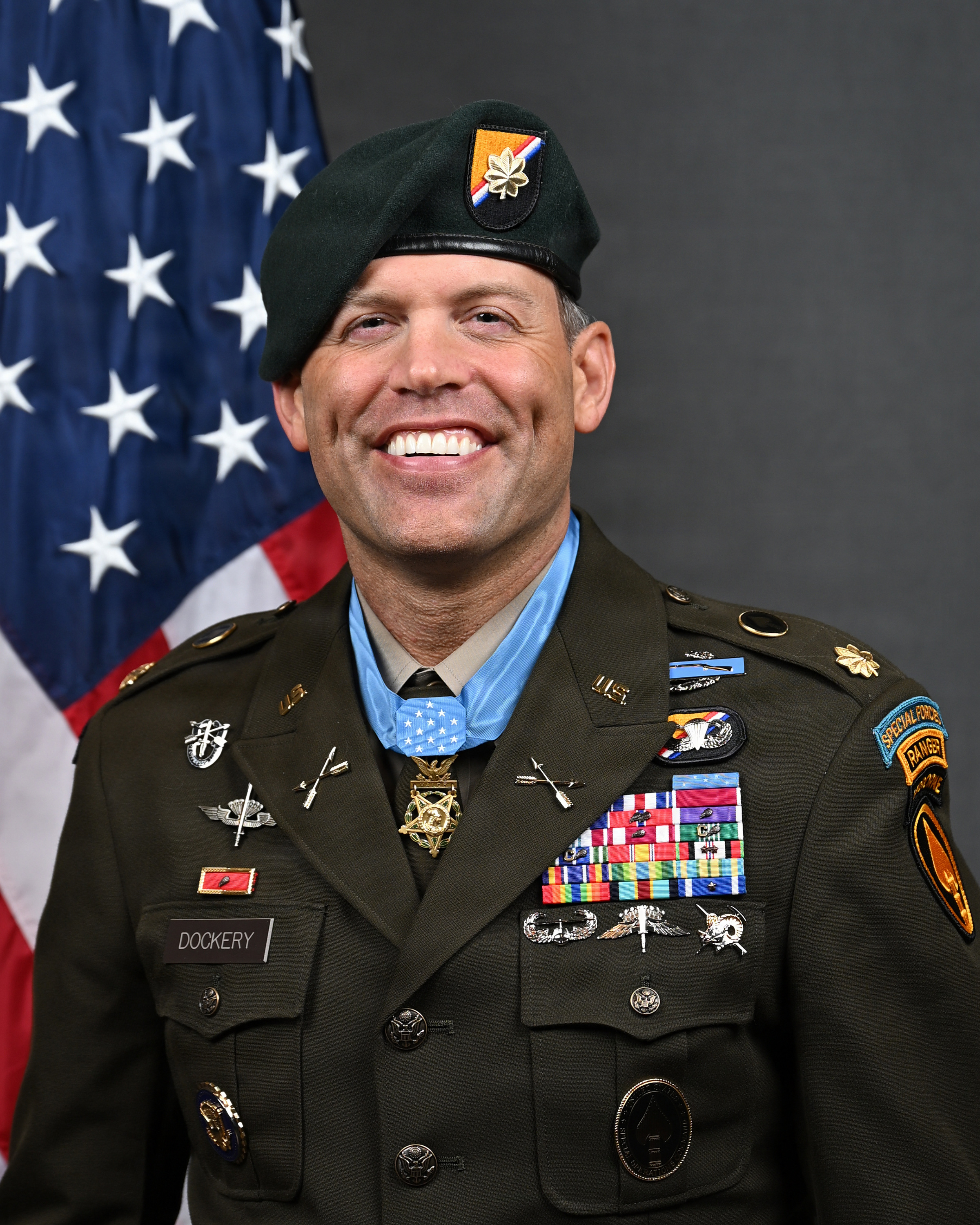
Nicholas Dockery

== See also ==
- List of American Civil War generals
- List of Medal of Honor recipients

== Bibliography ==
- "West Point Medal of Honor recipients". Home of Heroes. 2003. Archived from the original on 16 March 2009.
