= Charles Heyl =

Charles Heyl may refer to:

- Charles H. Heyl (1849–1926), US Army officer and Medal of Honor recipient
- Charles W. Heyl (1857–1936), American businessman, fire chief, and politician
