= Order of the Indian Wars of the United States =

The Order of the Indian Wars of the United States (OIWUS) is a military society founded in 1896 by officers of the United States Army who served in campaigns against Native Americans from the American Revolution to the late 19th century. (Note: OIWUS is not related to The Order of the Indian Wars organization that was founded by Jerry Russell in 1979.)

== History ==
The OIWUS was founded in 1896 by Colonel (later Brigadier General) Bernard J.D. Irwin, a recipient of the Medal of Honor, at Fort Sheridan near Chicago. It was patterned after other American military societies such as the Society of the Cincinnati, the Aztec Club of 1847 and the Military Order of the Loyal Legion of the United States. Its primary purpose is to provide fellowship to is members and preserve the history of the Indian Wars.

== Objects ==
According to its constitution the objects of the OIWUS are to

... perpetuate the memories of the services rendered by the military forces of the United States in their conflicts and wars against hostile Indians within the territory or jurisdiction of the United States, and to collect and secure for publication historical data relating to the instances of heroic service and personal devotion by which Indian warfare has been illustrated.

== Membership ==
Membership originally consisted of veteran officers (termed Original Companions) and their male descendants (termed Hereditary Companions). Over the first fifty years of the Order's existence its membership included 300 Original Companions, 275 Hereditary Companions and 75 Junior Companions. In time, the Original Companions died out and the only members were hereditary companions. More recently, membership was expanded to include descendants of soldiers who served in wars with Native Americans dating back to the early 1600s.

Currently, Hereditary Companions can be either (1) the direct lineal or collateral descendants of Original Companions of the Order, or (2) Commissioned Officers of the United States Armed Forces, who are direct lineal descendants of honorably discharged enlisted men who had the qualifications requisite for eligibility for membership as Original Companions, save that of having been commissioned.

Membership may also be considered for gentlemen who are lineally descended from persons, of any rank, who engaged in combat against Native Americans serving in a military unit under the British Crown, prior to June 14, 1776. Membership is by invitation only.

== Companions ==
- General John J. Pershing
- Lieutenant General Hunter Liggett
- Lieutenant General Nelson A. Miles - Medal of Honor recipient and U.S. Army Commanding General
- Lieutenant General Samuel Baldwin Marks Young - Medal of Honor recipient and U.S. Army Chief of Staff
- Major General Zenas R. Bliss - Medal of Honor recipient
- Major General Joseph T. Dickman
- Major General Frederick D. Grant - Son of General Ulysses S. Grant
- Major General Ulysses S. Grant III - Grandson of General Ulysses S. Grant
- Major General Cortlandt Parker
- Major General James Parker (Medal of Honor) - Medal of Honor recipient
- Major General James A. Ulio - U.S. Army Adjutant General
- Major General Leonard Wood - Medal of Honor recipient
- Major General Hugh L. Scott - U.S. Army Chief of Staff
- Major General William W. Wotherspoon - U.S. Army Chief of Staff
- Brevet Major General George W. Baird - Medal of Honor recipient.
- Brigadier General Thomas Lincoln Casey, Sr. - Chief Engineer for the U.S. Army
- Brigadier General William Preble Hall - Medal of Honor recipient
- Brigadier General Frederick Phisterer - Medal of Honor recipient
- Brigadier General Marion Maus - Medal of Honor recipient
- Brigadier General Edward J. McClernand - Medal of Honor recipient
- Brigadier General Bernard J. D. Irwin - Medal of Honor recipient
- Brevet Brigadier General Reuben F. Bernard - First President of the Order from 1896 to 1902
- Colonel George Burnett - Medal of Honor recipient
- Colonel Charles Heyl - Medal of Honor recipient
- Colonel Herbert Jermain Slocum - Cavalry officer
- Colonel Charles A. Varnum - Medal of Honor recipient
- Major Robert Carter - Medal of Honor recipient
- Major John O. Skinner - Medal of Honor recipient

== See also ==
- Continental Society Daughters of Indian Wars
- Society of the Cincinnati
- Aztec Club of 1847
- Military Order of the Loyal Legion of the United States
- Military Order of Foreign Wars
- Military Order of the Dragon
- Military Order of the Carabao
- Military Order of the World Wars
