= General Fryer =

General Fryer may refer to:

- Eli Thompson Fryer (1878–1963), U.S. Marine Corps brigadier general
- Frederick Fryer (British Army officer) (1871–1943), British Army brigadier general
- John Fryer (British Army officer) (1838–1917), British Army lieutenant general
