= John O. Skinner =

US Indian Wars Medal of Honor recipient

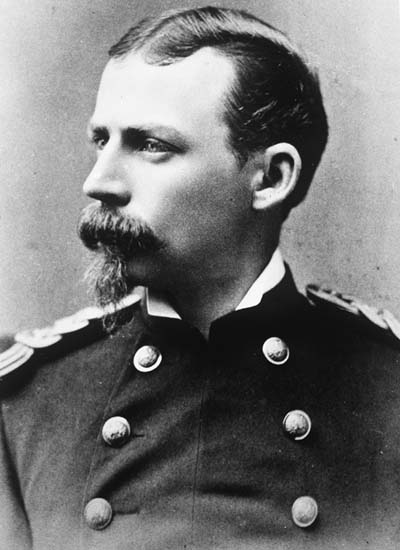
John O. Skinner

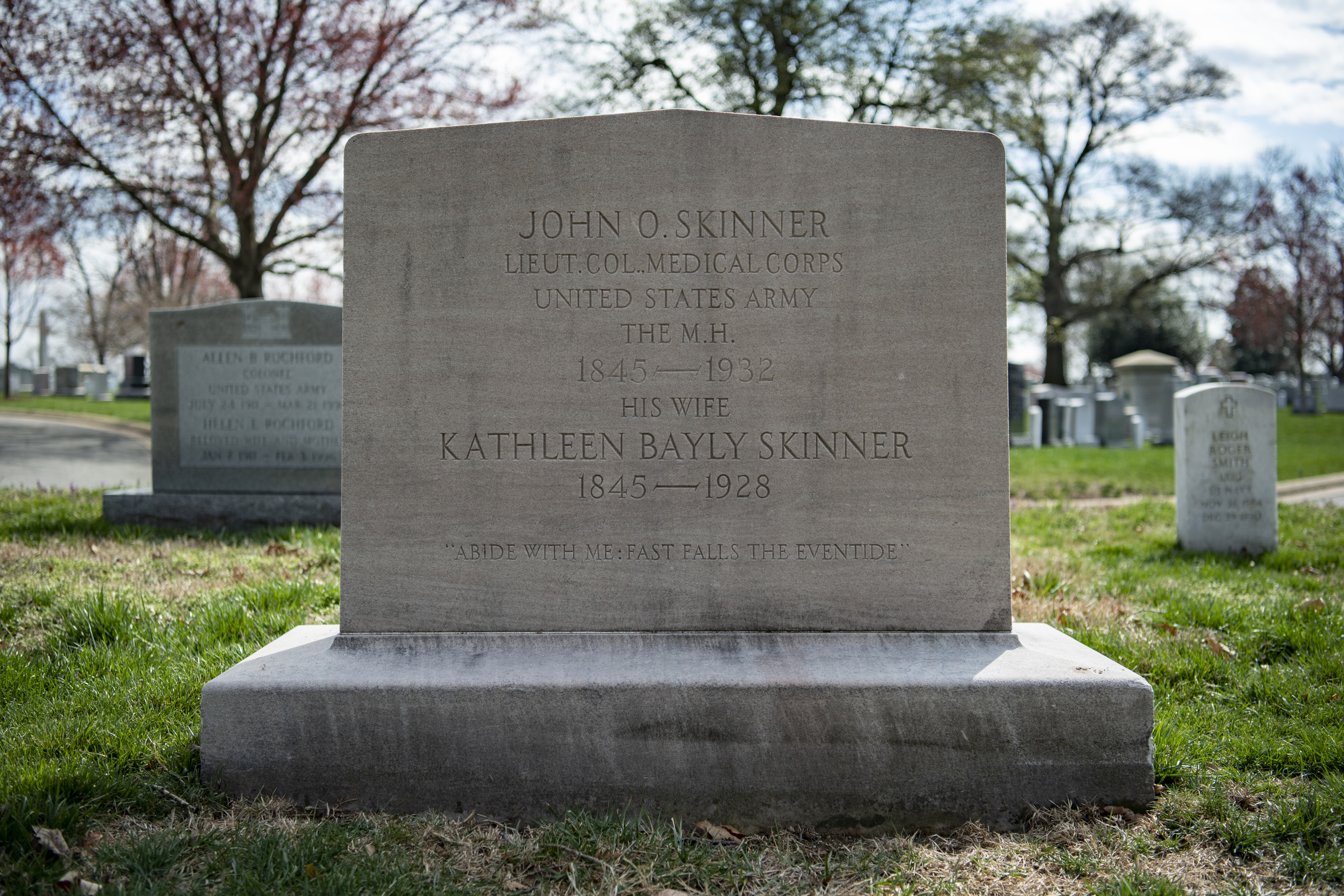
Grave at Arlington National Cemetery

John Oscar Skinner (May 4, 1845 – September 12, 1932) was an American physician who received the Medal of Honor for actions while a civilian contract surgeon serving with the U.S. Army on January 17, 1873, at Lava Beds, Oregon.

== Biography ==
Skinner was born in Baltimore on May 4, 1845, and was the son of John J. and Emeline Jones Skinner. He attended the Sorbonne in Paris, took special courses at the University of Würzburg in Germany and the University of Vienna and graduated from the University of Pennsylvania and the University of Maryland.

In January 1871 Skinner was a contract surgeon with the U.S. Army at Vancouver Barracks in Washington Territory. His Medal of Honor action occurred in January 1873. He was commissioned in the Army as an assistant surgeon on November 10, 1874. He was one of four officers who accompanied General George Crook on his reconnaissance of the Navajo and Apache country in the southwest United States.

He was the custodian of the legendary Apache Chief Geronimo during his imprisonment at Fort Marion in St. Augustine, Florida, from 1887 to 1893. He was promoted to surgeon with the rank of major on March 9, 1892, and retired from the Army on October 26, 1893, shortly after Geronimo's departure from Fort Marion.

After leaving the Army he was superintendent of Columbia Hospital in Washington, D.C., for fifteen years.

He received his Medal of Honor in April 1915, 42 years after his heroic actions. It was presented to him by President Woodrow Wilson.

In October 1918, late in World War I, he returned to active duty with the United States Army Medical Corps as a surgeon with the rank of lieutenant colonel and was placed in charge of the United States Army Dispensary in Washington. He was discharged in January 1919.

He was a member of the Sons of the American Revolution, Order of the Indian Wars of the United States, the Military Order of the Carabao, the American Legion, the Optimist Club and the National Press Club.

He died on September 12, 1932, and is buried at Arlington National Cemetery.

== Awards ==
- Medal of Honor
- Indian Campaign Medal
- World War I Victory Medal

=== Medal of Honor citation ===
Rescued a wounded soldier who lay under a close and heavy fire during the assault on the Modoc stronghold after 2 soldiers had unsuccessfully attempted to make the rescue and both had been wounded in doing so.

== See also ==
- List of Medal of Honor recipients for the Indian Wars
- Mary Edwards Walker – Civilian recipient of the Medal of Honor
- Buffalo Bill Cody – Civilian recipient of the Medal of Honor
