= William Preble Hall =

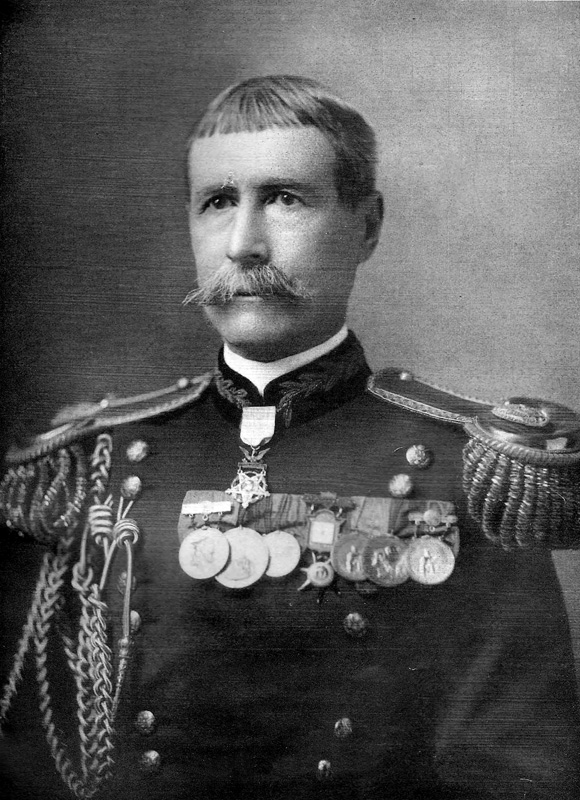
- William Preble Hall, c. 1897, around the time he was awarded the Medal of Honor
- Born: June 11, 1848; Randolph County, Missouri, US
- Died: December 14, 1927 (aged 79); Washington, D.C., US
- Burial place: Arlington National Cemetery
- Military career
- Allegiance: United States of America
- Branch: United States Army
- Service years: 1868–1912
- Rank: Brigadier General
- Commands: Adjutant General of the U. S. Army
- Conflicts: American Indian Wars; Spanish–American War
- Awards: Medal of Honor

Signature
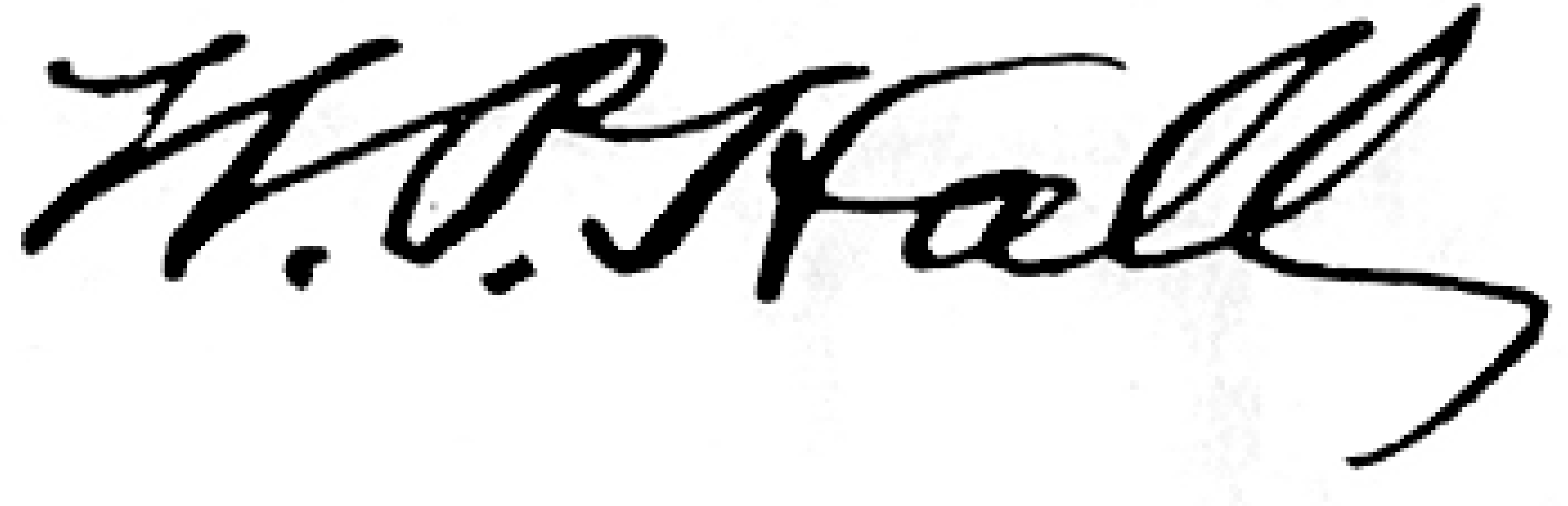

William Preble Hall (June 11, 1848 – December 14, 1927) was an American military officer who was Adjutant General of the United States Army. He was awarded the Medal of Honor for valor in action on October 20, 1879, near the White River in Colorado. An 1868 graduate of West Point, he served in the Army until his retirement in 1912, attaining the rank of brigadier general.

== Military career ==
He was appointed to West Point from the state of Missouri, graduating with the class of 1868. His first assignment was with the 19th Infantry. He then served in the 5th Cavalry, the unit in which he was awarded the Medal of Honor. He served principally on Western Frontier duty until the Spanish–American War. It was during a battle with hostile Indians while in command of a reconnoitering party near a camp on the White River (Colorado), October 28, 1879, that he was cited for the Medal of Honor. Hall went to the rescue of a fellow officer who was surrounded by about 35 warriors. He received the medal on September 18, 1897.

He also served in Puerto Rico from 1899 to 1900. He was appointed Adjutant General of the U.S. Army on February 17, 1912, and retired from active duty on June 11, 1912.

He was a member of several distinguished Army marksmanship teams from 1879 to 1892 and won medals on all the teams, shooting the carbine and revolver. While a colonel and Assistant Adjutant General, Hall authored the book How to Shoot a Revolver (Kansas City: Hudson-Kimberly, 1901, Ray Riling 1522). The author's preface is dated December 24, 1895.

=== Medal of Honor citation ===
His rank and organization: First Lieutenant, 5th U.S. Cavalry. Place and date: Near Camp on White River, Colo., 20 October 1879. Entered service at: Huntsville, Mo. Birth: Randolph County, Mo. Date of issue: 18 September 1897.

Citation:

With a reconnoitering party of 3 men, was attacked by 35 Indians and several times exposed himself to draw the fire of the enemy, giving his small party opportunity to reply with much effect.

== Personal life ==
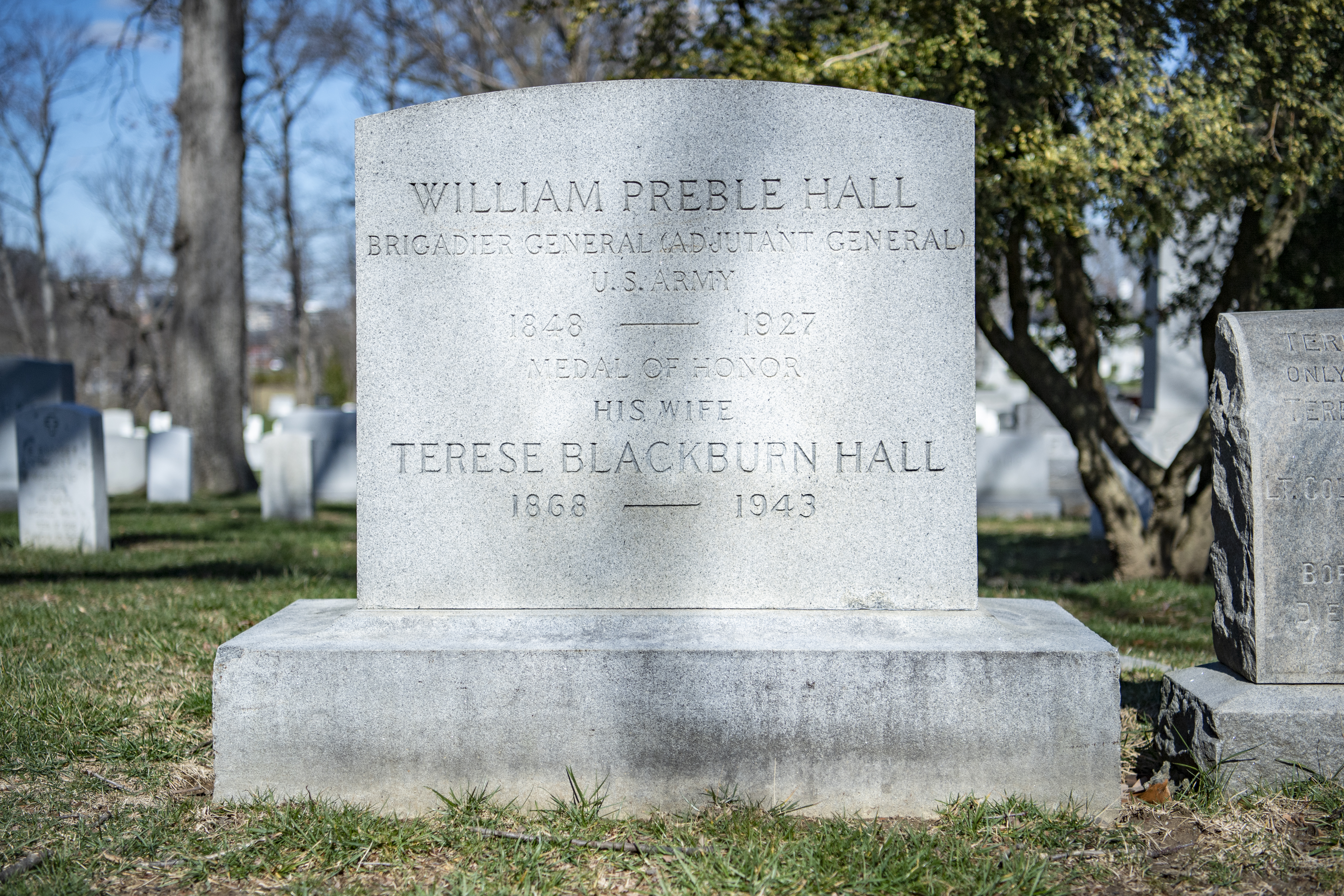
Grave at Arlington National Cemetery

Hall was born in Randolph County, Missouri.

He married Ms. Terese Blackburn (1868–1943), daughter of Senator Joseph Clay Stiles Blackburn of Kentucky. They had a daughter who died in childhood, Terese Preble Hall (1894–1899). Both his wife and daughter Terese are buried with him in Section 1 of Arlington National Cemetery. They had two additional children live to adulthood, Blackburn Hall, a graduate of West Point and former Major of the Regular Army, of Los Angeles, California, and Octavia Preble Hall (1900–1981), who later took the name Terese, and married Colonel Percy McCay Vernon, Regular Army, of Amite, Louisiana.

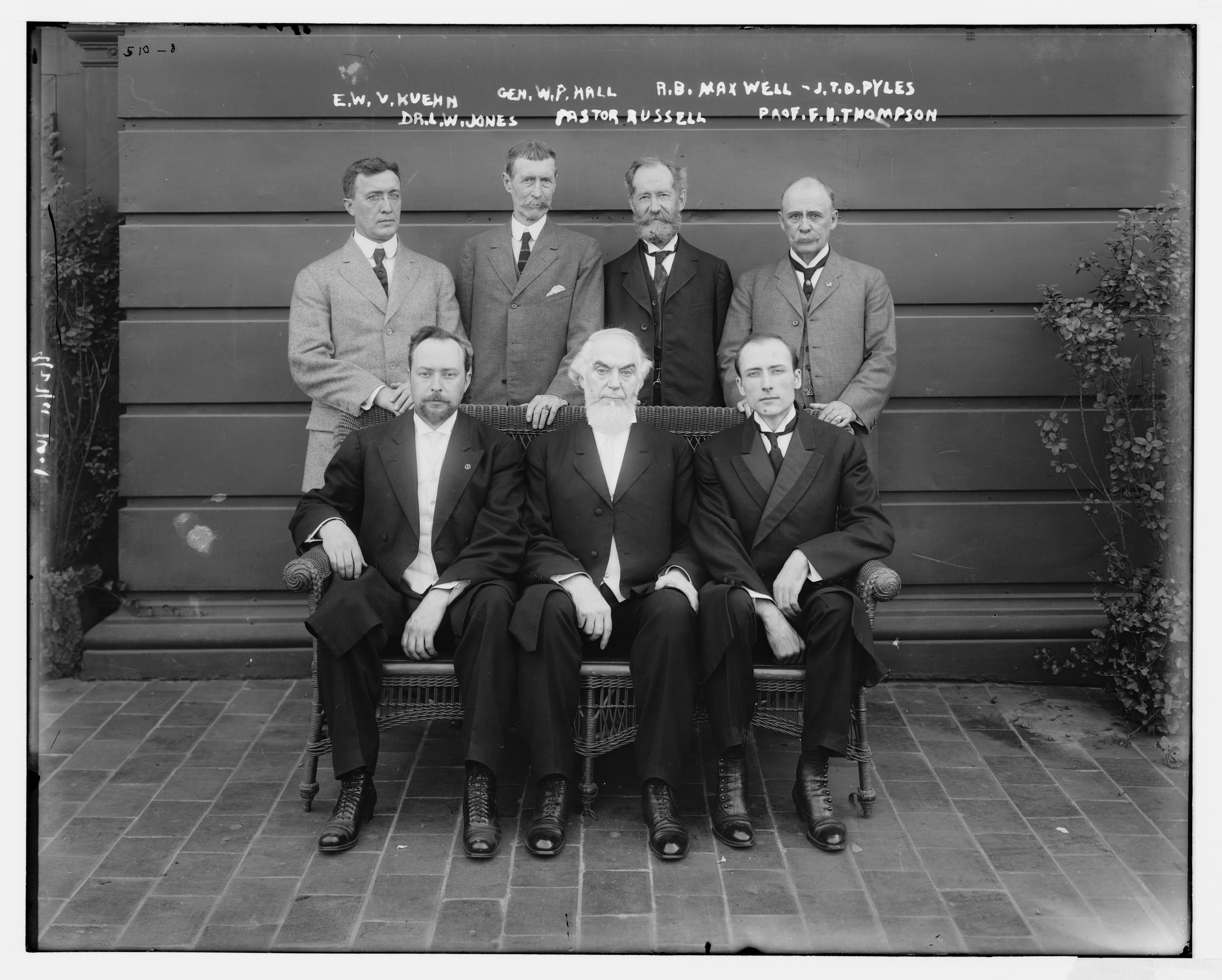
IBSA's "Missions Investigation Committee" in 1911 Seated is Charles Taze Russell

Hall was associated with the International Bible Students Association (IBSA) for several years before his death. In September 1911, the IBSA appointed a "Missions Investigation Committee", chaired by Charles Taze Russell, to travel to Japan, China, the Philippines, and India in order to make recommendations for future missionary efforts and expenditures, and General Hall was among the seven appointed committeemen. In the April 15, 1912 issue of the Watch Tower, the following was published above the signatures of "Adj.-Gen'l W. P. Hall" and the other committeemen:

The gentlemen who have served on this Committee are all earnest Bible Students. Their zeal in the matter of this investigation may be judged from the fact that they not only paid their own expenses, but additionally defrayed Pastor Russell's and all secretarial expenses. These gentlemen have long been deeply interested in the propagation of the Gospel, both at home and abroad.

Speaking of the entire committee, Jehovah's Witnesses' official history says, "Wherever they went they spoke about God's purpose to bring blessings to mankind by means of the Messianic Kingdom. Sometimes their audience was small, but in the Philippines and in India, there were thousands." The Committee presented its report at a March 31, 1912 meeting at the New York Hippodrome, attended by 5,200 and chaired by then-future Watch Tower Society president Joseph F. Rutherford.

General Hall was a member of the Order of the Indian Wars of the United States.

== Awards ==
- Medal of Honor
- Indian Campaign Medal
- Spanish War Service Medal
- Army of Puerto Rican Occupation Medal
- Philippine Campaign Medal

== See also ==
- List of Adjutant Generals of the U.S. Army
- List of Medal of Honor recipients for the Indian Wars
- List of United States Military Academy alumni (Medal of Honor)

Military offices
Preceded by Fred C. Ainsworth	Adjutant General of the U. S. Army; February 17, 1912 – June 11, 1912	Succeeded by George Andrews
