= George Ritter Burnett =

United States Army Medal of Honor recipient

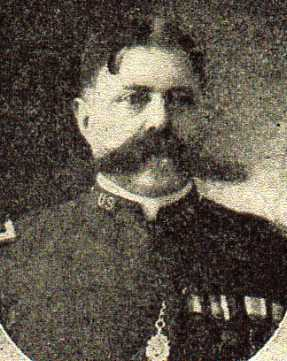
- Born: April 23, 1858; Lower Providence Township, Pennsylvania
- Died: November 1, 1908 (aged 50); Lincoln, Nebraska
- Burial place: Arlington National Cemetery
- Military career
- Allegiance: United States of America
- Branch: United States Army; Iowa National Guard; Missouri National Guard
- Service years: 1880–1891 (Army); 1892–1908 (National Guard)
- Rank: First Lieutenant (Army); Colonel (National Guard)
- Unit: 9th Cavalry Regiment
- Conflicts: Indian Wars
- Awards: Medal of Honor

George Ritter Burnett (April 23, 1858 – November 1, 1908) was a United States Army officer who received the U.S. military's highest decoration, the Medal of Honor.

== Life and career ==
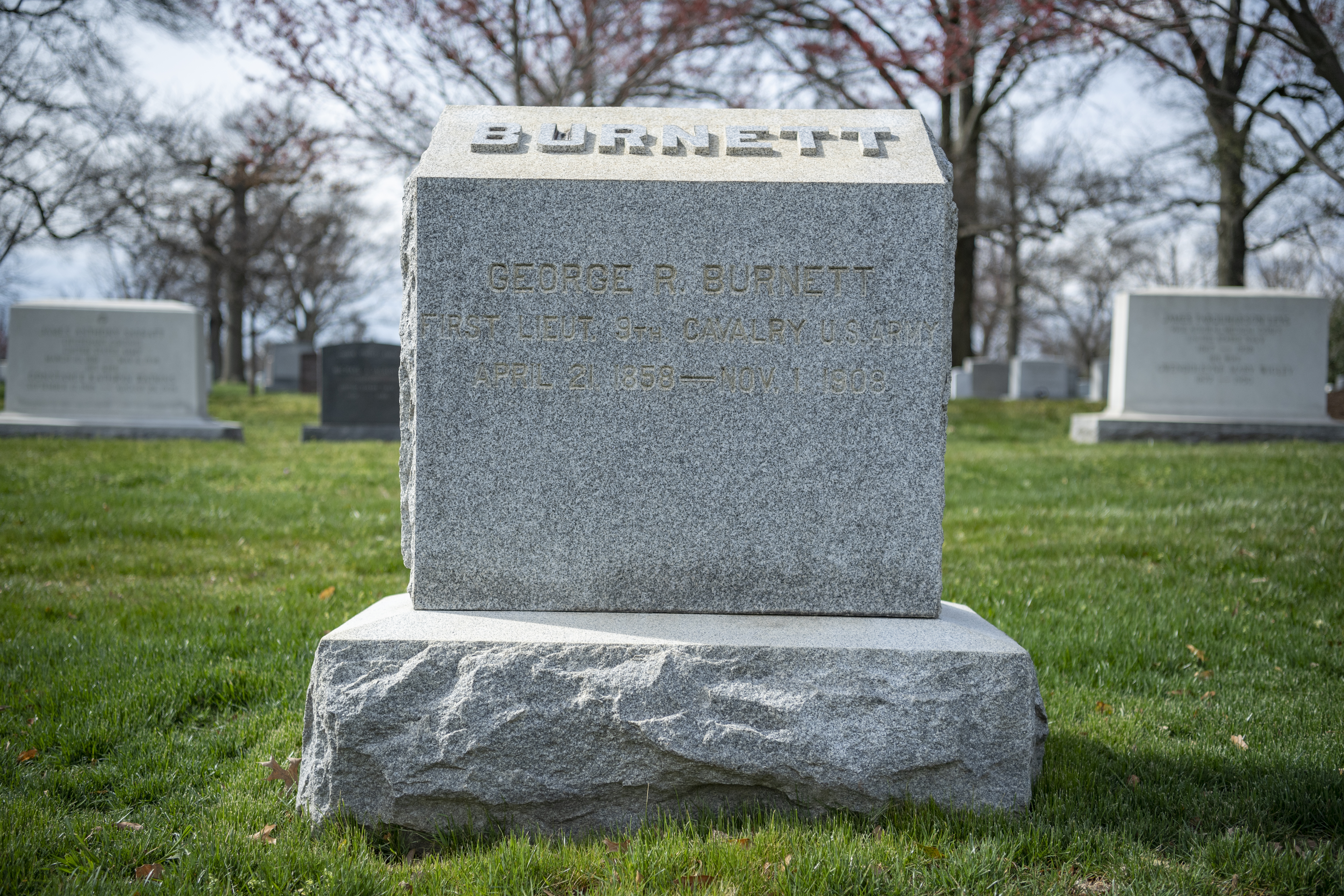
Grave at Arlington National Cemetery

Burnett graduated from the United States Military Academy in 1880. On August 16, 1881, he was serving as a second lieutenant with the 9th Cavalry Regiment of the Buffalo Soldiers. On that day, Burnett participated in the Battle of Cuchillo Negro Creek in the Black Range Mountains near Cuchillo Negro Creek of New Mexico, where he was cited for helping rescue stranded soldiers under heavy fire. One of his privates, Augustus Walley, and a first sergeant, Moses Williams also received the Medal of Honor for actions in this battle. He retired due to injuries in February 1891. He subsequently served as a colonel in the Iowa National Guard from 1892 until 1905, and in the Missouri National Guard from 1905 until 1908.

Burnett served as United States Vice Consul and Acting Consul in Kehl, Baden, Germany from September 1905 to March 1907. He also worked at many military preparatory schools.

== Medal of Honor citation ==
Rank and organization. Second Lieutenant, 9th U.S. Cavalry. Place and date: At Cuchillo Negro Mountains, N. Mex., August 16, 1881. Entered service at: Spring Mills, Pa. Birth. Lower Providence Township Pa. Date of issue: July 23, 1897.

Citation:

Saved the life of a dismounted soldier, who was in imminent danger of being cut off, by alone galloping quickly to his assistance under heavy fire and escorting him to a place of safety, his horse being twice shot in this action.

== See also ==
- List of Medal of Honor recipients for the Indian Wars
- List of United States Military Academy alumni (Medal of Honor)
