= Augustus Walley =

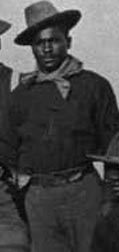
- Augustus Walley when he was with the 10th Cavalry, c. 1898
- Born: March 10, 1856; Reistertown, Maryland
- Died: April 9, 1938 (aged 82); Baltimore, Maryland
- Burial place: Saint Luke's Cemetery in Reisterstown, Maryland
- Military career
- Allegiance: United States of America
- Branch: United States Army
- Service years: 1878 - 1907, 1918 - 1919
- Rank: First Sergeant
- Units: 9th Cavalry Regiment; 10th Cavalry Regiment
- Conflicts: American Indian Wars; Spanish–American War; Philippine–American War; World War I
- Awards: Medal of Honor

Augustus Walley (March 10, 1856 – April 9, 1938) was a Buffalo Soldier in the United States Army and a recipient of America's highest military decoration—the Medal of Honor—for his actions in the Indian Wars of the western United States.

== Biography ==
Walley was born into slavery in Reisterstown, Maryland in 1856. He joined the army from Baltimore in November 1878.

On August 16, 1881, Walley was serving as a private in Company I of the 9th Cavalry Regiment. On that day, Walley participated in the Battle of Cuchillo Negro Creek in the Black Range Mountains near Cuchillo Negro Creek of New Mexico, where he was cited for "[b]ravery in action with hostile Apaches" for helping rescue stranded soldiers under heavy fire. His Lieutenant, George Ritter Burnett, and First Sergeant Moses Williams also received the Medal of Honor for their actions in this battle. Nine years later, on October 1, 1890, he was issued the Medal of Honor for his actions during the engagement.

Walley retired from the army in February 1907, having also served in the Spanish–American War and Philippine–American War. In 1918, he volunteered for duty at Camp Beauregard, Louisiana, but was turned away because of his age. Walley remained in Beauregard as a laborer for the Army for the remainder of the first world war. He died at age 82 and was buried at Saint Luke's Cemetery in Reisterstown, Maryland.

== Medal of Honor ==
Rank and organization: Private, Company I, 9th U.S. Cavalry. Place and date: At Cuchillo Negro Mountains, N. Mex., August 16, 1881. Entered service at: ------. Birth: Reistertown, Md. Date of issue: October 1, 1890.

Citation:

Bravery in action with hostile Apaches.

== See also ==
- List of Medal of Honor recipients
- List of Medal of Honor recipients for the Indian Wars
- List of African American Medal of Honor recipients
