= Frank West (Medal of Honor) =

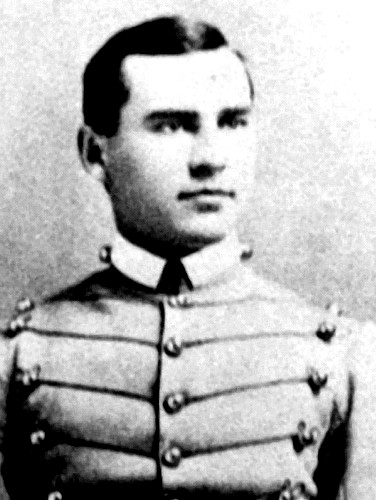
- Born: September 26, 1850; Mohawk, Herkimer County, New York, US
- Died: August 26, 1923 (aged 72); Mohawk, New York, US
- Burial place: Arlington National Cemetery
- Military career
- Allegiance: United States
- Branch: United States Army
- Service years: 1872–1914
- Rank: Colonel
- Unit: 6th Cavalry Regiment
- Commands: 2nd Cavalry Regiment
- Conflicts: Indian Wars; *Apache Wars; *Battle of Big Dry Wash; Spanish–American War; Philippine–American War
- Awards: Medal of Honor

Frank West (September 26, 1850 – August 26, 1923) was a United States Army colonel who was a recipient of the Medal of Honor for actions in fighting Indians at the Battle of Big Dry Wash, Arizona. West is an 1872 graduate of West Point.

== Early life and the western frontier ==
West served in the 6th Cavalry Regiment on the western frontier. He was awarded the Medal of Honor for rallying his men against a fortified position at Big Dry Wash, Arizona. Three other men, Second Lieutenant George H. Morgan, Second Lieutenant Thomas Cruse and First Sergeant Charles Taylor were also awarded Medals of Honor in this action. Morgan and Cruse are also Academy graduates. West became Colonel of the 2nd Cavalry Regiment in October 1906, and was retired on his 64th birthday in 1914.

His wife was Rebecca Kenyon.

== Medal of Honor citation ==
West was awarded the Medal of Honor in 1892 for action at Big Dry Wash, Arizona, on 17 July 1882.

Citation: "Rallied his command and led it in the advance against the enemy's fortified position."
