= Charles H. Heyl =

US Army officer and Medal of Honor recipient

Charles Heath Heyl
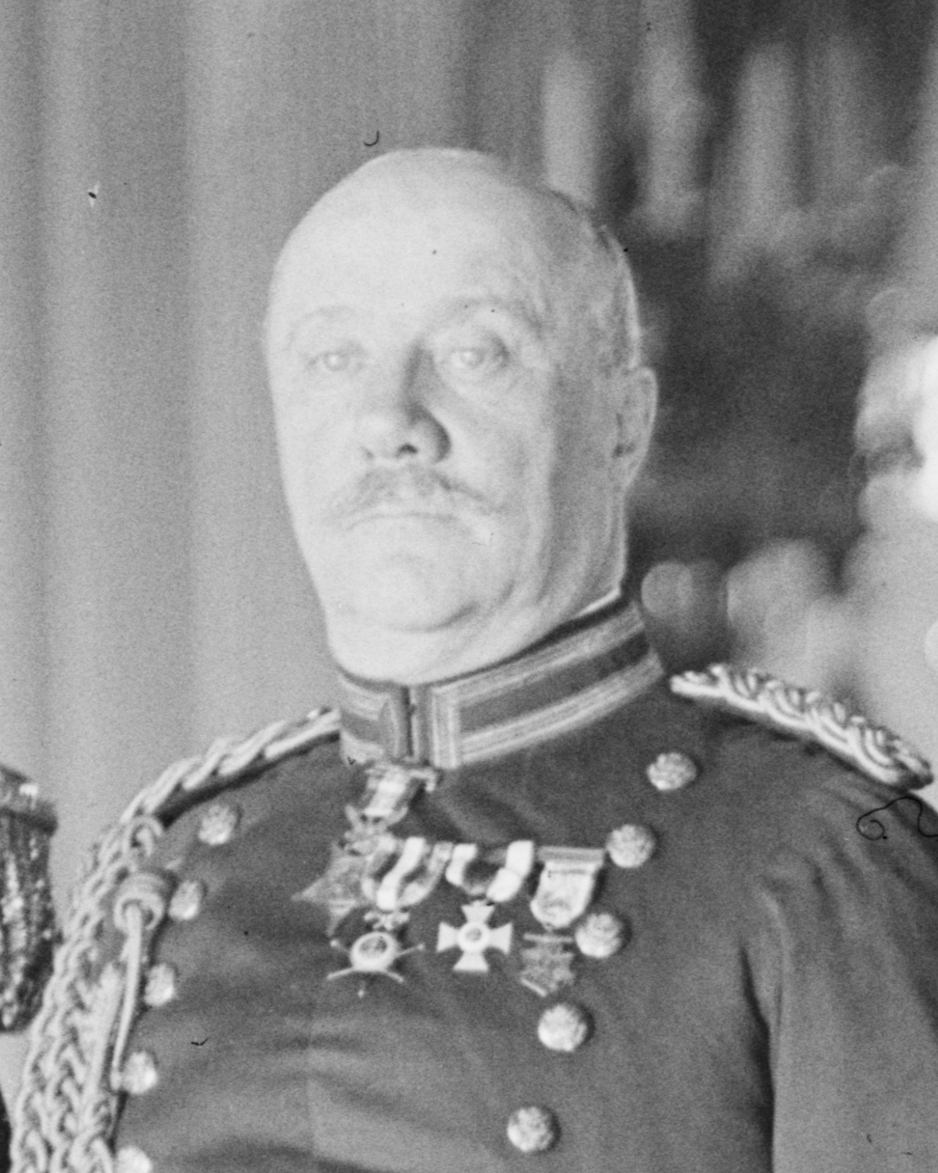
- Portrait of Charles Heath Heyl
- Born: Charles Heath Heyl; July 22, 1849; Philadelphia, Pennsylvania, U.S.
- Died: October 26, 1926 (aged 77)
- Buried: Arlington National Cemetery
- Allegiance: United States
- Branch: United States Army
- Rank: Colonel
- Commands: 23 Infantry Regiment
- Conflicts: American Indian Wars; Spanish–American War

Charles Heath Heyl (July 22, 1849 – October 12, 1926) was a US Army officer who received the Medal of Honor for his actions during the Indian Wars. He was born in Philadelphia.

Heyl was commissioned in the 23 Infantry Regiment in October 1873, and served as regimental adjutant from 1890 to 1891. During the Spanish–American War, he was promoted to major and assistant adjutant general in May 1898, and became an inspector general of volunteers in July. He was again promoted to lieutenant colonel in December 1899, and to colonel in July 1902. He retired in November 1904.

He was a member of the Sons of the American Revolution and the Order of the Indian Wars of the United States.

Heyl was buried in Arlington National Cemetery.

== Medal of Honor citation ==
Rank and organization: Second Lieutenant, 23rd U.S. Infantry. Place and date: Near Fort Hartsuff, Nebr., April 28, 1876. Entered service at: Camden, N.J. Birth: Philadelphia, Penn. Date of issue: October 26, 1897.

Voluntarily, and with most conspicuous gallantry, charged with 3 men upon 6 Indians who were entrenched upon a hillside.
