= Charles Taylor (cavalryman) =

American cavalryman (1840–1899)

- Born: 1840; Baltimore, Maryland, US
- Died: August 3, 1899 (aged 58–59); Washington, D.C., US
- Burial place: Soldiers Home National Cemetery
- Military career
- Allegiance: United States of America
- Branch: United States Army
- Rank: First Sergeant
- Units: Company D, 3rd U.S. Cavalry
- Conflicts: Indian Wars; Apache Wars; Battle of Big Dry Wash
- Awards: Medal of Honor

Charles Taylor (1840 – August 3, 1899) was an American cavalry soldier and Medal of Honor recipient. He was cited for "gallantry in action" in the Battle of Big Dry Wash in the Apache Wars in the Arizona Territory in 1882, for which he received the Medal of Honor. Three other men, First Lieutenant Frank West, Second Lieutenant Thomas Cruse and Second Lieutenant George H. Morgan were also awarded Medals of Honor in this action.

== Death and burial ==
Taylor attained the rank of First Sergeant and served in Company B, 23rd U.S. Infantry before his death on August 3, 1899 in Barnes Hospital at the Soldiers Home in Washington, D.C. He is buried at Soldiers Home National Cemetery in plot K-6851.

== Medal of Honor citation ==
Rank and organization: First Sergeant, Company D, 3d U.S. Cavalry. Place and date: At Big Dry Wash, Ariz., 17 July 1882. Entered service at: ------. Birth: Baltimore, Md. Date of issue: 16 December 1882.

Citation:

Gallantry in action.

== See also ==
- List of Medal of Honor recipients
- List of Medal of Honor recipients for the Indian Wars
