= George H. Morgan =

American cavalry officer and Medal of Honor recipient

George Horace Morgan
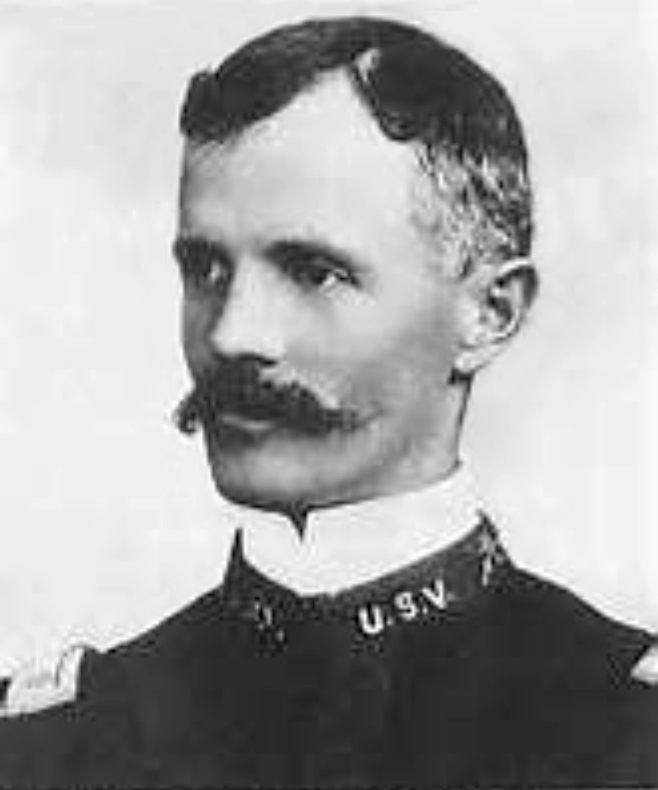
- George Horace Morgan
- Born: January 1, 1855; St. Catharines, Canada West
- Died: February 14, 1948 (aged 93); Washington, D.C., US
- Burial place: Arlington National Cemetery
- Military career
- Allegiance: United States
- Branch: United States Army
- Service years: 1880–1919
- Rank: Colonel
- Unit: 3rd Cavalry Regiment
- Commands: 15th Cavalry Regiment; 8th Cavalry Regiment; 17th Cavalry Regiment
- Conflicts: Indian Wars; *Apache Wars; *Battle of Big Dry Wash; Spanish–American War; Philippine–American War; World War I
- Awards: Medal of Honor; Silver Star (2)

George Horace Morgan (January 1, 1855 – February 14, 1948) was an American cavalry officer and Medal of Honor recipient.

== Early life ==
George Horace Morgan was born in St. Catharines, Canada West, on January 1, 1855, to George N. Morgan, who would later serve as a general in the American Civil War.

== Military career ==
Morgan was appointed to the U.S. Military Academy at West Point from Minnesota in 1876, graduating in 1880. He was post commander of Fort Myer, Virginia, when he held the rank of major from March to June 1899.

Morgan served in all the United States' wars from the Indian Wars to World War I. He was wounded by an Apache in the Battle of Big Dry Wash in the Arizona Territory in 1882, for which he received the Medal of Honor. The bullet remained near his heart for over 60 years until it shifted in 1948 and caused his death. He is the namesake of Camp Morgan in Bosnia. Three other men, First Lieutenant Frank West, Second Lieutenant Thomas Cruse and First Sergeant Charles Taylor were also awarded Medals of Honor in this action. West and Cruse are also Academy graduates.

Colonel Morgan was an hereditary companion of the Military Order of the Loyal Legion of the United States by right of his father's service in the Union Army during the American Civil War.

== Death and burial ==
Morgan attained the rank of colonel in April 1914, and retired on New Year's Day 1919. He is buried in Arlington National Cemetery.

== Medal of Honor citation ==
Rank and organization: Second Lieutenant, 3rd U.S. Cavalry. Place and date: At Big Dry Wash, Ariz., July 17, 1882. Entered service at: Minneapolis, Minn. Birth: Canada. Date of issue: July 15, 1892.

Citation:

Gallantly held his ground at a critical moment and fired upon the advancing enemy (hostile Indians) until he was disabled by a shot.

== See also ==
- List of Medal of Honor recipients for the Indian Wars
