= Thomas Cruse =

American army officer (1857–1943)

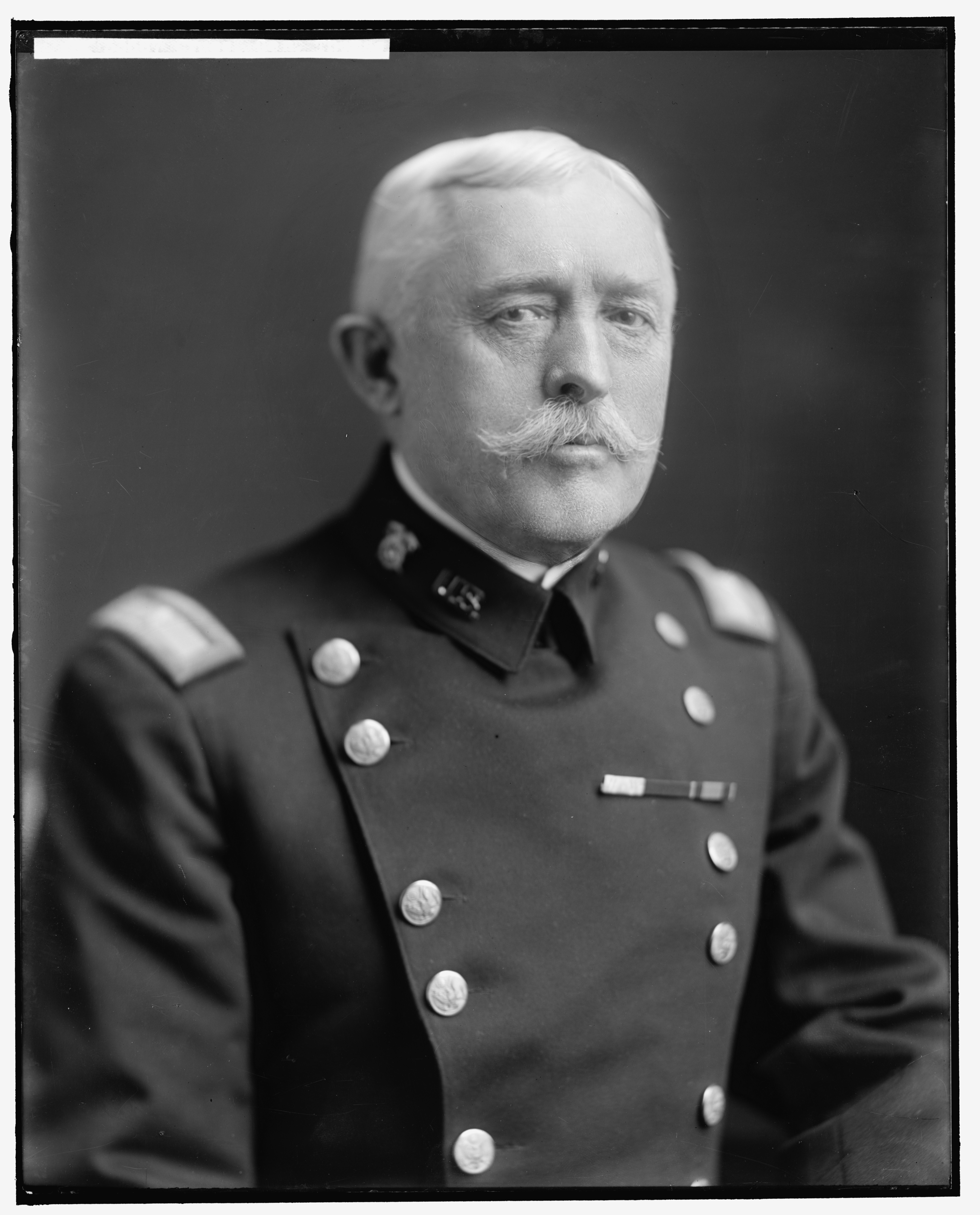
- Born: December 29, 1857; Owensboro, Kentucky, US
- Died: June 8, 1943 (aged 85); Fort Sam Houston, Texas
- Burial place: Arlington National Cemetery
- Military career
- Allegiance: United States
- Branch: United States Army
- Service years: 1879–1918
- Rank: Brigadier general
- Conflicts: Indian Wars; Apache Wars; Battle of Big Dry Wash; Philippine–American War; World War I
- Awards: Medal of Honor

Thomas Cruse (December 29, 1857 – June 8, 1943) was a brigadier general in the United States Army who was a recipient of the Medal of Honor for valor in action on July 17, 1882, at the Battle of Big Dry Wash, Arizona. An 1879 graduate of West Point, he served in numerous campaigns on the Western Frontier and later in the Philippines. He retired as a brigadier general in 1918.

== Education and military career ==
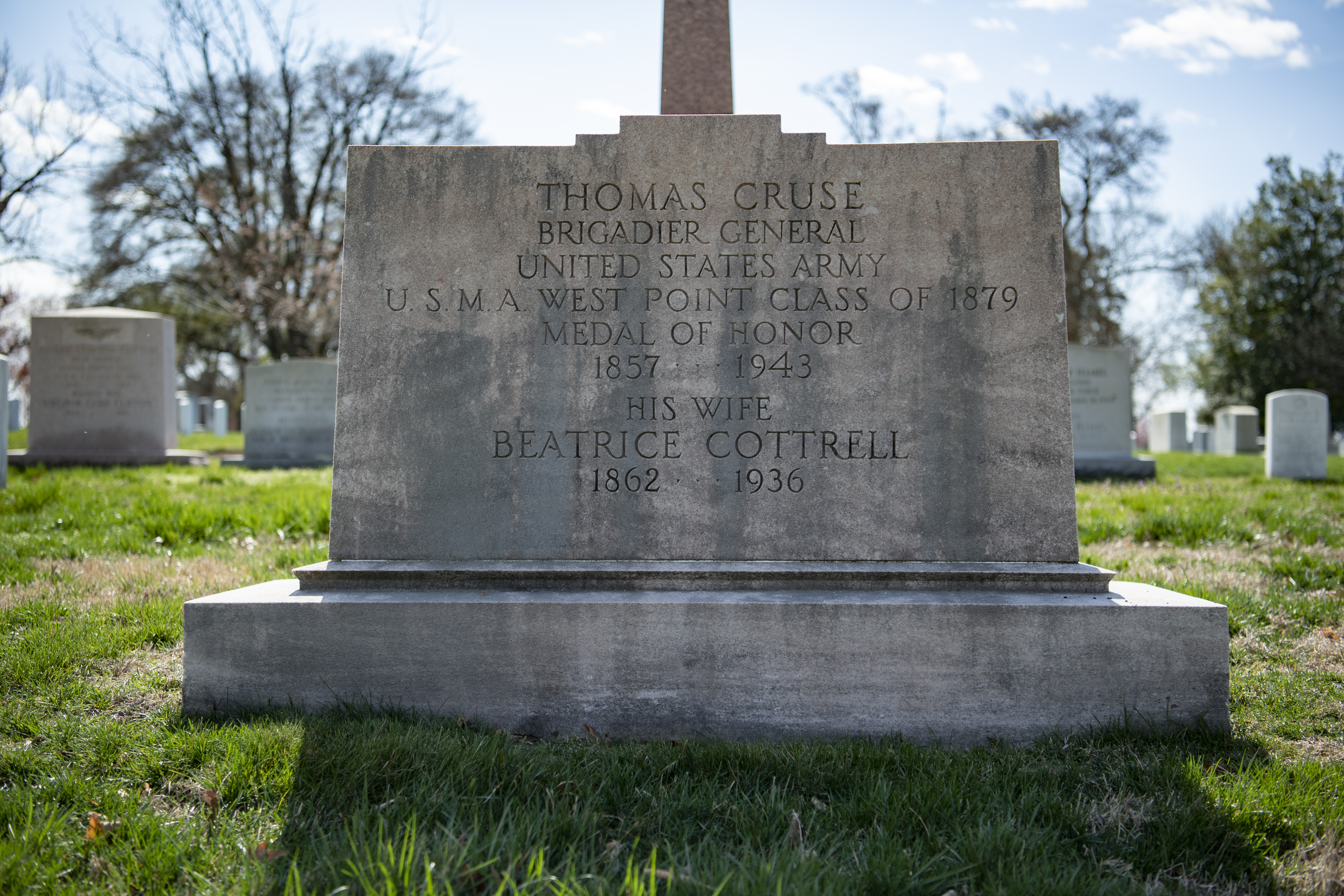
Grave at Arlington National Cemetery

Cruse was born in Owensboro, Kentucky on December 29, 1857. Before attending West Point, he attended Centre College in Kentucky from 1874 to 1875. He then began attendance at the United States Military Academy, from which he graduated in 1879. Cruse was commissioned a second lieutenant in the 6th United States Cavalry upon graduation. Cruse was an honor graduate of the Infantry and Cavalry School in 1891. On July 12, 1892, he received the Medal of Honor "for distinguished gallantry in action with hostile Indians" at Big Dry Fork, Arizona on July 17, 1882. Three others also received the Medal of Honor for this action: Frank West, George H. Morgan, and Charles Taylor. Cruse later served in the Philippine–American War. He graduated from the Army War College in April 1916 and was promoted to brigadier general in December 1916. He retired from active duty in January 1918, nine months after the American entry into World War I.

=== Fraud allegations ===
Shortly after his retirement, Cruse was accused of involvement in a scandal involving acquisition procedures which involved his employment with Chicago manufacturing agent Henry H. Lippert. Lippert and his son Ralph were arrested; they argued that they had not committed fraud, and that Cruse had not been employed by them until after his retirement from the military. All three argued that Cruse had obtained an opinion from the Army's Judge Advocate General, Enoch Crowder, which indicated that becoming an agent of the Lippert company did not violate the law. The case against Ralph Lippert was not pursued because he was drafted into the military. In April 1918, Cruse followed the advice of Henry Pinckney McCain, the Inspector General of the Army, to return to the Lipperts the money they had paid him (about $1,000), which ended his involvement in the matter. The case was resolved when authorities in Chicago reviewed the evidence against the Lipperts and declined to prosecute.

== Medal of Honor citation ==
Rank and organization: Second Lieutenant, 6th U.S. Cavalry. Place and date: At Big Dry Fork, Ariz., July 17, 1882. Entered service at: Owensboro, Ky. Birth: Owensboro, Ky. Date of issue: July 12, 1892.

Citation

Gallantly charged hostile Indians, and with his carbine compelled a party of them to keep under cover of their breastworks, thus being enabled to recover a severely wounded soldier.

== Personal life ==
Cruse retired to Longport, New Jersey, where he wrote Apache Days and After. He died on June 8, 1943, and was buried in Section 3, Lot 1763, of Arlington National Cemetery.

He married Ms. Beatrice Cottrell (1862–1936), who is buried with him. They had two sons, Fred Taylor Cruse and United States Naval Academy Midshipman James Thomas Cruse. James was killed in an explosion aboard the USS Georgia in 1907. He is buried next to his parents.

Fred T. Cruse was married to Marjorie Hamilton Hinds (1891–1986), the daughter of Major General Ernest Hinds.
