= Battle of Big Dry Wash =

1882 battle between the United States Army and White Mountain Apache

- Part of Apache Wars
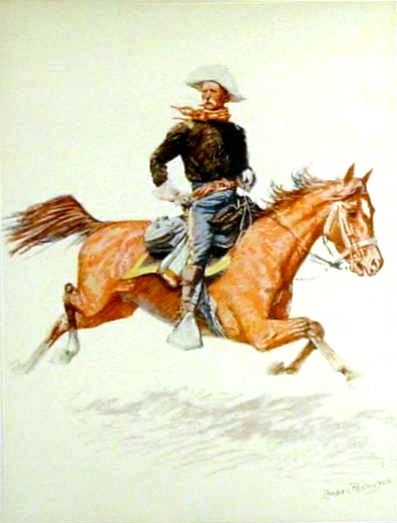
- A U.S. cavalry officer
Date	July 17, 1882
Location	Coconino County, Arizona Territory
Result	United States victory

Belligerents
Apache	United States

Commanders and leaders
Na-tio-tish †	(United States) Adna Chaffee

Strength
~60 warriors	350 cavalry

Casualties and losses
20 killed	2 killed 6 wounded

The Battle of Big Dry Wash was fought on July 17, 1882, between troops of the United States Army's 3rd Cavalry Regiment and 6th Cavalry Regiment and warriors of the White Mountain Apache tribe.The location of the battle was called "Big Dry Wash" in Major Evans' official report, but later maps called the location "Big Dry Fork", which is how it is cited in the four Medal of Honor citations that resulted from the battle.

== Background ==
In the spring of 1882, a party of about 60 White Mountain Apache warriors, coalesced under the leadership of a warrior called Na-tio-tish. In early July some of the warriors ambushed and killed four San Carlos policemen, including the police chief. After the ambush, Na-tio-tish led his band of warriors northwest through the Tonto Basin. Local Arizona settlers were greatly alarmed and demanded protection from the army which immediately sent out fourteen companies of cavalry from forts in the region.

In the middle of July, Na-tio-tish led his band up Cherry Creek to the Mogollon Rim, intending to reach General Springs, a well-known water hole on the Crook Trail. The Apaches noticed that they were trailed by a single troop of cavalry and decided to lay an ambush seven miles north of General Springs where a fork of East Clear Creek cuts a gorge into the Mogollon Rim. The Apaches hid on the far side and waited.

The cavalry company was led by Captain Adna R. Chaffee. However, Chaffee's chief scout, Al Sieber, discovered the Apaches' trap and warned the troops. During the night, Chaffee's lone company was reinforced by four more from Fort Apache under the command of Major Andrew W. Evans. Britton Davis was also present, and wrote about the battle in his book The Truth about Geronimo (1929).

== Battle ==
Early in the morning of July 17, one company of cavalry opened fire from the rim facing the Apaches. Meanwhile, Chaffee sent two companies upstream and two downstream to sneak across the canyon and attack the Apaches. Na-tio-tish failed to post lookouts and the troops crossed over undetected. From sixteen to twenty-seven warriors were killed, including Na-tio-tish. On the ridge overlooking the wash, Lieutenant George H. Morgan commanded the first major engagement of the battle. As he exposed himself to enemy fire, a bullet ripped through his arm and into his body.

About two hours into the battle, Lieutenant Thomas Cruse spotted an encampment site of the Apaches which appeared to be deserted. He took command of four men and dashed across the ravine to capture the camp. Upon reaching the site, several hidden warriors fired upon Cruse and his men, mortally wounding the soldier to Cruse's immediate right, Private Joseph McLarnon. Cruse dragged Pvt. McLarnon to back to the safety of their previous position. As the battle pitched in intensity, Lieutenant Frank West took command of Chaffee's cavalry troop while Chaffee was engaged with commanding the battle. The first shots were fired around 3:00pm and the battle lasted until nightfall, when a heavy thunderstorm struck, bringing rain and hail. Sieber, together with fellow scout Tom Horn and soldier Lt. George H. Morgan, slipped to the banks opposite of the Apache line, and provided rifle fire for the cavalry.

Pressured and outgunned, the remaining Apache warriors, under the cover of darkness and the storm, slipped away on foot and retreated to a nearby Apache reservation, about 20 miles away. The site of the battle is now a historical park, in Coconino County, Arizona.

== Aftermath ==
Four men received the Medal of Honor for actions at this battle: Thomas Cruse, George H. Morgan, Charles Taylor, and Frank West. Cruse, Morgan, and West were all Lieutenants and West Point graduates. Taylor was a career soldier and troop First Sergeant at the time of the battle. This engagement was the last major battle between the United States Army and Apache warriors, the wars were not over yet however. The U.S. army would soon begin the Geronimo Campaign which ended with Geronimo's capture in 1886. Even then Apache attacks on white settlers in Arizona continued as late as the year 1900.
