= Eli Thompson Fryer =

US Marine Corps general and Medal of Honor recipient (1878–1963)

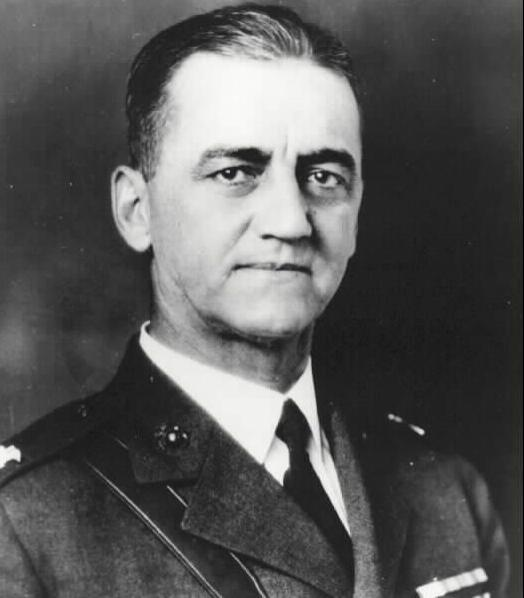
- BG Eli Thompson Fryer
- Born: August 22, 1878; Hightstown, New Jersey, U.S.
- Died: June 6, 1963 (aged 84); Coral Gables, Florida, U.S.
- Burial place: Arlington National Cemetery
- Military career
- Allegiance: United States of America
- Branch: United States Marine Corps
- Service years: 1900–1934
- Rank: Brigadier general
- Commands: 1st Marine Regiment; 2nd Marine Regiment
- Conflicts: Philippine–American War; Vera Cruz Expedition
- Awards: Medal of Honor

Eli Thompson Fryer (August 22, 1878 – June 6, 1963) was a United States Marine Corps brigadier general who was a recipient of the Medal of Honor for valor in action on July 21–22 April 1914 at Vera Cruz, Mexico. A former member of West Point's class of 1901, he joined the United States Marine Corps in 1900.

== Early life and occupation of Vera Cruz ==
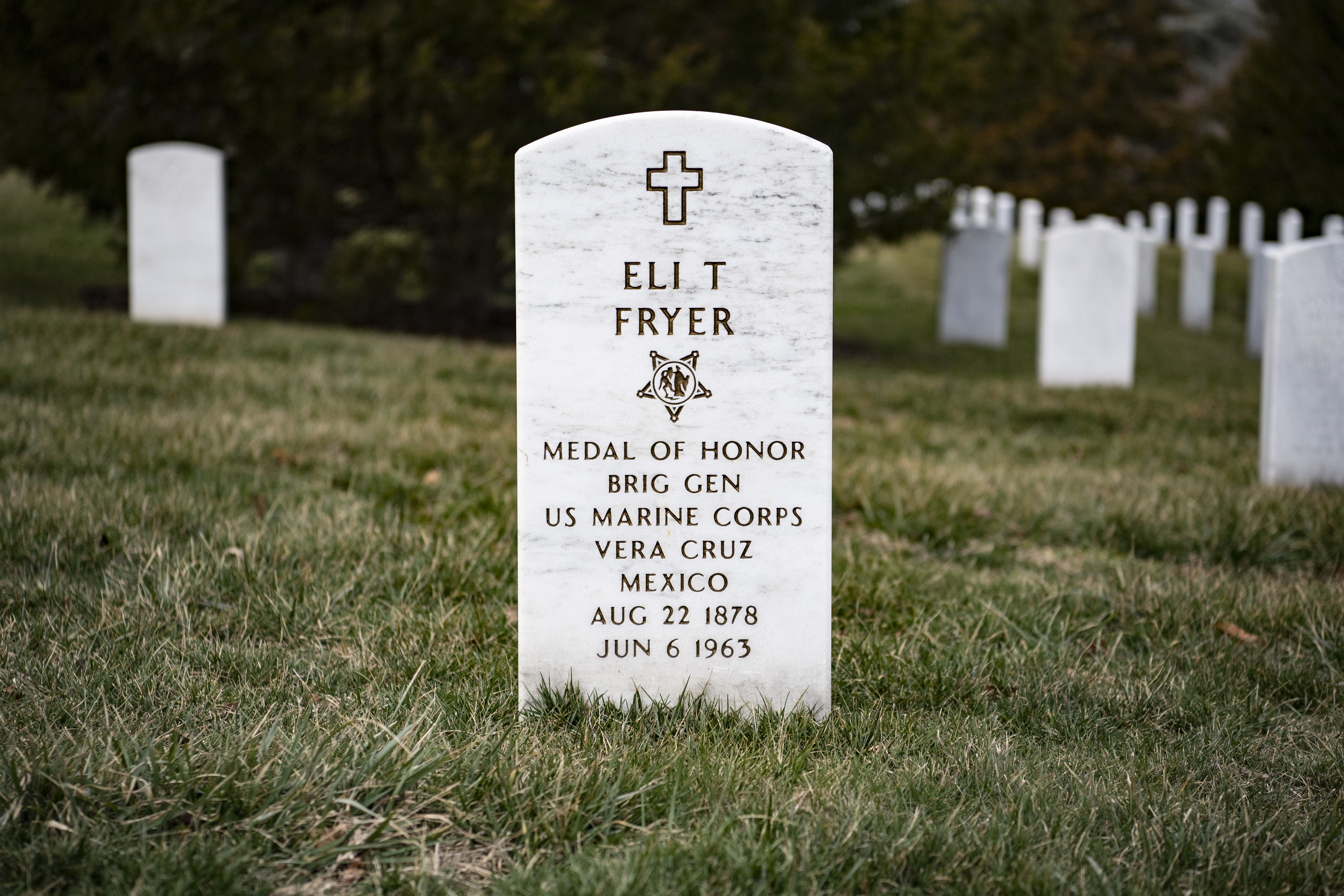
Grave at Arlington National Cemetery

Fryer was born in Hightstown, New Jersey, on August 22, 1878. He entered West Point in 1897 as a member of the class of 1901, but was honorably discharged on June 19, 1899. He was appointed second lieutenant in the United States Marine Corps on March 21, 1900.

After initial training at the Marine barracks, in New York City, he served in Newport, Rhode Island (August 1901 – June 1903). During that time he served a brief period of duty with the Marine battalion in Panama (September 13 – December 8, 1902). In 1903 to 1905, he served with the Marine expeditionary battalion aboard the USS Panther and at Camp Roosevelt, Culebra, Puerto Rico, and commanded Marines at Dry Tortugas, Florida.

Following a one-year tour of duty back at the Marine barracks in New York, served two years in the Philippines (1906–1908). For next five years, he served as post quartermaster for Marine Barracks, School of Application, Annapolis, Maryland, and commanding Marine detachments aboard the USS Louisiana (BB-19), USS New Hampshire (BB-25) and USS Alabama (BB-8). Fryer was assigned to Pensacola, Florida, where he deployed to Vera Cruz.

Fryer was retired from the Marine Corps in July 1934, and promoted to brigadier general on the retired list in February 1942. He was buried at Arlington National Cemetery, Arlington, Virginia.

== Medal of Honor citation ==
Rank and organization: Captain, U.S. Marine Corps. Born: 22 August 1878, Hightstown, N.J. Appointed from: New Jersey. G.O. No.: 177, 4 December 1915.

Citation:

For distinguished conduct in battle, engagements of Vera Cruz, 21 and 22 April 1914. In both days' fighting at the head of his company, Captain Fryer was eminent and conspicuous in his conduct, leading his men with skill and courage.

== See also ==
- List of Medal of Honor recipients (Veracruz)
