= Moses Williams (Medal of Honor) =

American military officer and Buffalo Soldier

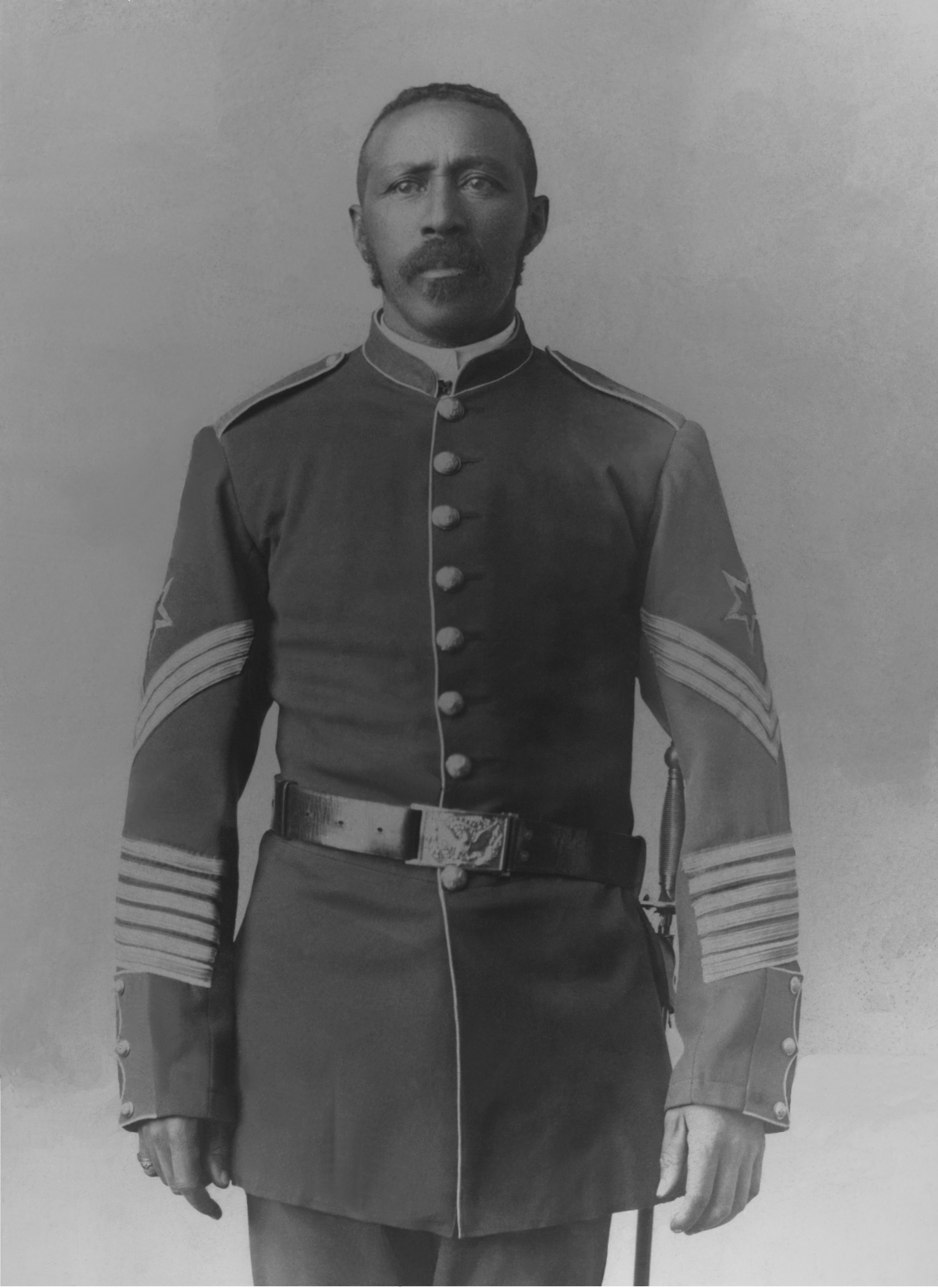
- Ordnance Sergeant Williams
- Born: October 10, 1845; Carrollton, Louisiana, US
- Died: August 23, 1899 (aged 53); Vancouver, Washington, US
- Burial place: Vancouver Barracks National Cemetery, Vancouver, Washington
- Military career
- Allegiance: United States of America
- Branch: United States Army
- Service years: 1866 - 1898
- Rank: Ordnance sergeant
- Units: 9th Cavalry Regiment; Coast Artillery Corps, Ft. Stevens, Oregon
- Conflicts: American Indian Wars
- Awards: Medal of Honor

Moses Williams (October 10, 1845 – August 23, 1899) was a Buffalo Soldier in the United States Army and a recipient of America's highest military decoration—the Medal of Honor—for his actions in the Indian Wars of the western United States.

== Biography ==
Childhood

The details of Williams childhood are sparse. He was born in Carrollton, Louisiana, which is described as a “residential bedroom suburb of New Orleans. The only record of his childhood was his army reenlistment form from 1871 which says, “Father and Mother died while I was an infant”.... “One brother died of consumption; one sister died of fever”

On July 28, 1866, as part of The Army Reorganization Act of 1866 - Buffalo Soldiers the 39th Congress added two Cavalry regiments specifically for Black soldiers, who were identified as United States Colored Troops. Historical documents show that they were also called “colored regulars” to identify them as more than auxiliary troops

Historian Anthony L. Powell explains from first-hand account that joining the Army was a significant opportunity for young African American men; it offered economic security, purpose and an education. He points out that the post-civil war economy left large numbers of African Americans unemployed and homeless.

== Military service ==
Enlisted 1866

In October 1866 Williams joined the newly formed 9th Cavalry regiment in New Orleans, Louisiana. Having no education before joining the army, he signed his enlistment form with an “X”. Soon after he attended training camp in Greenville, Louisiana. Buffalo Soldiers fought during the day and went to school most evenings, learning reading, writing and math.

=== San Antonio 1867-1875 ===
In March 1867, under the leadership of Colonel Edward Hatch, Williams was part of the twelve companies sent to San Antonio, Texas Buffalo Soldiers West Texas. There he was provided more training. In August 1867, he was promoted to first sergeant of Company F. In West Texas Company F of the 9th cavalry regiment was dispatched to protect stagecoach stations and mail delivery from raids by Comanches and Kiowas. When he reenlisted in 1871 he was moved to Company K of the Ninth Cavalry to serve as a first sergeant.

=== Battle of Cuchillo Negro Creek 1881 ===
August 16, 1881, Williams was serving in Company I of the 9th Cavalry Regiment. On that day he participated in the Battle of Cuchillo Negro Creek in the Black Range Mountains near Cuchillo Negro Creek of New Mexico, and was awarded the Medal of Honor for his actions.

=== Fort Stevens, Oregon 1895 - 1898 ===
Williams became one of the first African-American ordnance sergeants in 1886, and starting in 1895, served at Fort Stevens, Oregon, where he was charged with the care of large coastal gun emplacements.

=== Retired May 12, 1898 ===
According to military records Williams retired in May 1898 due to health issues. He lived in Vancouver Washington at the Vancouver Barracks and died the next year at the age of 53. Williams only had nine books, a pipe, a cigar holder, some stamps, a pen, pen points, his bed, some chairs, some neckties, and $23 to his name.[2] He was buried in Vancouver Barracks National Cemetery in Vancouver, Washington.

== Medal of Honor citation ==
First Sergeant Williams' official Medal of Honor citation reads:

Rallied a detachment, skillfully conducted a running flight of 3 or 4 hours, and by his coolness, bravery, and unflinching devotion to duty in standing by his commanding officer in an exposed position under a heavy fire from a large party of Indians saved the lives of at least 3 of his comrades.

== Theories on the origination of the name Buffalo Soldiers ==
Fierce fighting style: spirit of the buffalo

Appearance: Coats worn by Buffalo Soldiers called “Buffalo Robe” see photo from Smithsonian below. (although these coats were also worn by white Soldiers in the period, not just African Americans).

Coats worn by the 9th U.S. Cavalry Army know are the Buffalo soldiers. The coats were made from American bison from 1869, and on. It became a large part of their uniform due to the fact that there were few winter supplies. Many soldiers independently acquired buffalo robes to stay warm. “Buffalo Soldiers.”

== See also ==
- List of Medal of Honor recipients for the Indian Wars
- List of African American Medal of Honor recipients
- 9th Cavalry Regiment (United States)
