= List of Victory ships (F) =

This is a list of Victory ships with names beginning with F.

== Description ==
A Victory ship was a cargo ship. The cargo ships were 455 feet 3 inches (138.76 m) overall, 436 feet 6 inches (133.05 m) between perpendiculars They had a beam of 62 feet 0 inches (18.90 m), a depth of 38 feet 0 inches (11.58 m) and a draught of 28 feet 0 inches (8.53 m). They were assessed at 7,612 GRT, 4,555 NRT and 10,750 DWT.

The ships were powered by a triple expansion steam engine, driving a steam turbine via double reduction gear. This gave the ship a speed of 15.5 knots (28.7 km/h) or 16.5 knots (30.6 km/h), depending on the machinery installed.

Liberty ships had five holds. No. 1 hold was 57 feet 6 inches (17.53 m) long, with a capacity of 81,715 cubic feet (2,313.9 m^{3}), No. 2 hold was 45 feet 0 inches (13.72 m) long, with a capacity of 89,370 cubic feet (2,531 m^{3}), No. 3 hold was 78 feet 0 inches (23.77 m) long, with a capacity of 158,000 cubic feet (4,500 m^{3}), No. 4 hold was 81 feet 0 inches (24.69 m) long, with a capacity of 89,370 cubic feet (2,531 m^{3}) and No. 5 hold was 75 feet 0 inches (22.86 m) long, with a capacity of 81,575 cubic feet (2,309.9 m^{3}).

In wartime service, they carried a crew of 62, plus 28 gunners. The ships carried four lifeboats. Two were powered, with a capacity of 27 people and two were unpowered, with a capacity of 29 people.

== Fairmont Victory ==
Fairmont Victory was a troop transport built by Bethlehem Fairfield Shipyard, Baltimore, Maryland. Her keel was laid on 5 October 1944. She was launched on 25 November and delivered on 27 December. Built for the War Shipping Administration (WSA), she was operated under the management of International Freighting Corporation. Laid up in the James River in 1946. Sold in 1947 to Flota Mercante del Estado, Buenos Aires, Argentina and renamed Rio Araza. Sold in 1961 to Empresa Lineas Maritimas Argentinas, Buenos Aires. She was scrapped at Campana, Argentina in February 1972.

== Fayetteville Victory ==
Fayetteville Victory was built by Bethlehem Fairfield Shipyard. Her keel was laid on 19 February 1945. She was launched on 12 April and delivered on 8 May. Built for the WSA, she was operated under the management of Polarus Steamship Company. Laid up in the James River in 1946. Sold in 1947 to T. C. Munakalat Vakaleti Devlet Denizyollarive Limanlari Isletme, Istanbul, Turkey and renamed Yozgat. Sold in 1952 to Denizeilik Bankasi T. A. O., Istanbul. Sold in 1955 to D. B. Deniz Nakliyati T. A. A., Istanbul. Sold in 1975 to Cerrahzade Vapuru Donatma Istiraki, Istanbul and renamed Cerrahzade. She was scrapped at Alang, India in 1976.

== Fenn Victory ==
Fenn Victory was built by Permanente Metals Corporation, Richmond, California. Her keel was laid on 11 April 1945. She was launched on 15 May and delivered on 13 July. Built for the WSA, she was operated under the management of American-Hawaiian Steamship Company. Laid up at Mobile, Alabama in 1949. Later transferred to Suisun Bay. She was scrapped at Kaohsiung, Taiwan in 1984.

== Fisk Victory ==
Fisk Victory was built by Permanente Metals Corporation. Her keel was laid on 14 March 1945. She was launched on 25 April and delivered on 19 May. Built for the WSA, she was operated under the management of Agwilines Inc. To the United States Maritime Commission (USMC) in 1946 and laid up at Beaumont, Texas. Sold in 1951 to Bloomfield Steamship Co., Houston, Texas and renamed Margaret Brown. Sold in 1957 to States Marine Corp., Delaware, New York and renamed Palmetto State. Sold in 1960 to States Marine Lines, New York. Sold in 1970 to Reliance Carriers Inc., Panama and renamed Reliance Sincerity. She was scrapped at Kaohsiung in April 1971.

== Flagstaff Victory ==
Flagstaff Victory was built by California Shipbuilding Corporation, Terminal Island, Los Angeles, California. Her keel was laid on 31 October 1944. She was launched on 22 December and delivered on 29 January 1945. Built for the WSA, she was operated under the management of Seas Shipping Company. Sold in 1949 to States Marine Corp. and renamed Green Mountain State. Sold in 1960 to States Marine Lines. She collided with the Japanese tanker San Luis Maru off Yokohama in late April 1961. Sold in 1970 to Reliance Carriers Inc., Panama and renamed Reliance Solidarity. She was scrapped at Kaohsiung in May 1971.

== Fond du Lac ==
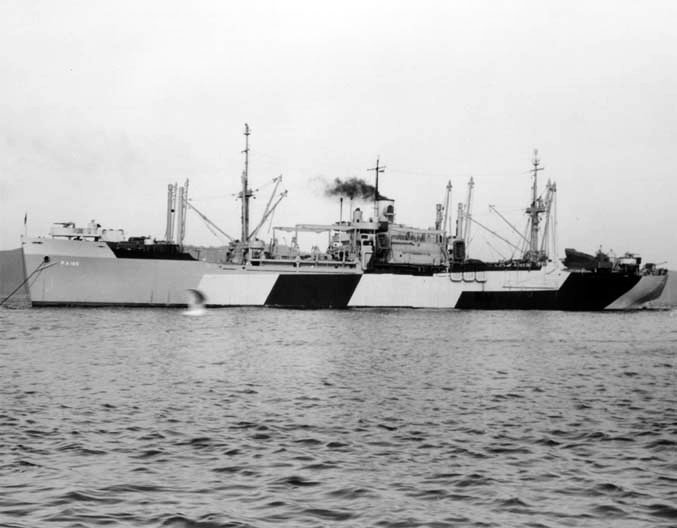
USS Fond du Lac

Fond du Lac was built by Oregon Shipbuilding Corporation, Portland, Oregon. Her keel was laid on 25 July 1944. She was launched on 5 October and delivered on 6 November. Built for the United States Navy. To the USMC in 1946 and laid up in the James River. She was scrapped in 1974.

== Fordham Victory ==
Fordham Victory was built by Permanente Metals Corporation. Her keel was laid on 13 January 1945. She was launched on 24 February and delivered on 21 March. Built for the WSA, she was operated under the management of Weyerhaeuser Steamship Company. Sold in 1948 to United States Lines, New York and renamed American Defender. Sold in 1956 to Olympia Steamship corp., New York and renamed Fordham Victory. Sold in 1957 to Marine Bulk Carriers Inc., New York and renamed Wang Archer. She ran aground 3 nautical miles (5.6 km) west of Freeport, Bahamas on 9 May 1959 whilst on a voyage from New Orleans, Louisiana to Bombay, India. Refloated on 17 May and found to be severely damaged. Escorted to Jacksonville, Florida, where she was repaired. Sold in 1959 to Marine Bulk Carriers Inc., New York and renamed Golden Sail. Renamed Fordham Victory in 1960 and laid up in the Columbia River. Sold on orders of the United States Marshals Service to Intercontinental Victories Inc., New York and renamed Vivian. Sold in 1962 to Intercontinental Transportation Co., New York. She lost her propeller on 28 April 1963 when 450 nautical miles (830 km) from Penang, Federation of Malaya whilst on a voyage from Chittagong, East Pakistan to Yokohama, Japan. She was towed in to Singapore, where she was declared a constructive total loss. She was scrapped at Hong Kong in August 1963.

== Frederick Victory ==
Frederick Victory was built by Bethlehem Fairfield Shipyard. Her keel was laid on 22 June 1944. She was launched on 9 September and delivered on 6 October. Built for the WSA, she was operated under the management of United Fruit Company. Laid up in Suisun Bay in 1946. she was scrapped at Terminal Island in 1975.

== Freestone ==
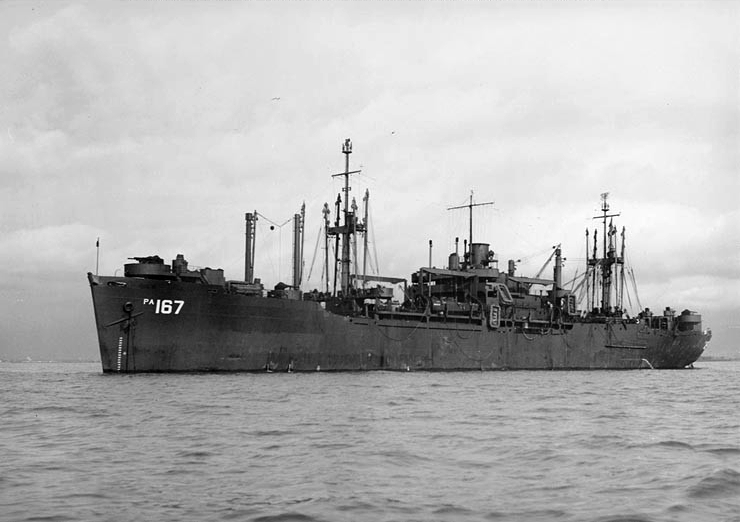
USS Freestone

Freestone was built by Oregon Shipbuilding Corporation. Her keel was laid on 4 August 1944. She was launched on 9 October and delivered on 9 November. Built for the United States Navy. To the USMC in 1946 and laid up in the James River. She was sold to New York shipbreakers in April 1973.

== Frontenac Victory ==
Frontenac Victory was built by Bethlehem Fairfield Shipyard. Her keel was laid on 16 November 1944. She was launched on 18 January 1945 and delivered on 14 February. Built for the WSA, she was operated under the management of Agwilines Inc. She collided with the T2 tanker Lone Jack in the Atlantic Ocean (37°42′N 57°53′W) on 2 March 1945. She put back to New York, where she was repaired. Laid up in the James River in 1946. Returned to service in 1966 due to the Vietnam War. Operated under the management of Weyerhaeuser Steamship Company. Laid up in Suisun Bay in 1973. She was scrapped at Kaohsiung in 1984.

== Frostburg Victory ==
Frostburg Victory was a troop transport built by Bethlehem Fairfield Shipyard. Her keel was laid on 3 November 1944. She was launched on 20 January 1945 and delivered on 19 February. Built for the WSA, she was operated under the management of Alcoa Steamship Company. Laid up in the James River in 1946. Sold in 1967 to Unisphere Tankers Corp., Wilmington, Delaware and renamed Oceanic Ondine. Sold in 1968 to Chatham Shipping Corp., Wilmington, Delaware. She put in to Algiers, Algeria on 19 December 1968 due to boiler damage whilst on a voyage from La Gouletta, Tunisia to Ceuta, Spain. She departed for Galveston, Texas on 28 December and was laid up on arrival. She broke from her moorings on 13 February 1969 and collided with Wellesley Victory. Subsequently detained under writ for damages. Sold by United States Marshals Service at auction on 23 May. New owners Windjammer Shipping Inc., Wilmington, Delaware and renamed Windjammer Susie. Sold in 1970 to Trans World Shipping Ltd., Panama and renamed Scotch Mist. Placed under detention at Singapore in 1971. Sold at auction in April 1971 by order of the Sheriff of the Singapore Supreme Court. She arrived at Kaohsiung under tow on 30 July and was scrapped there in August 1971.

== Furman Victory ==
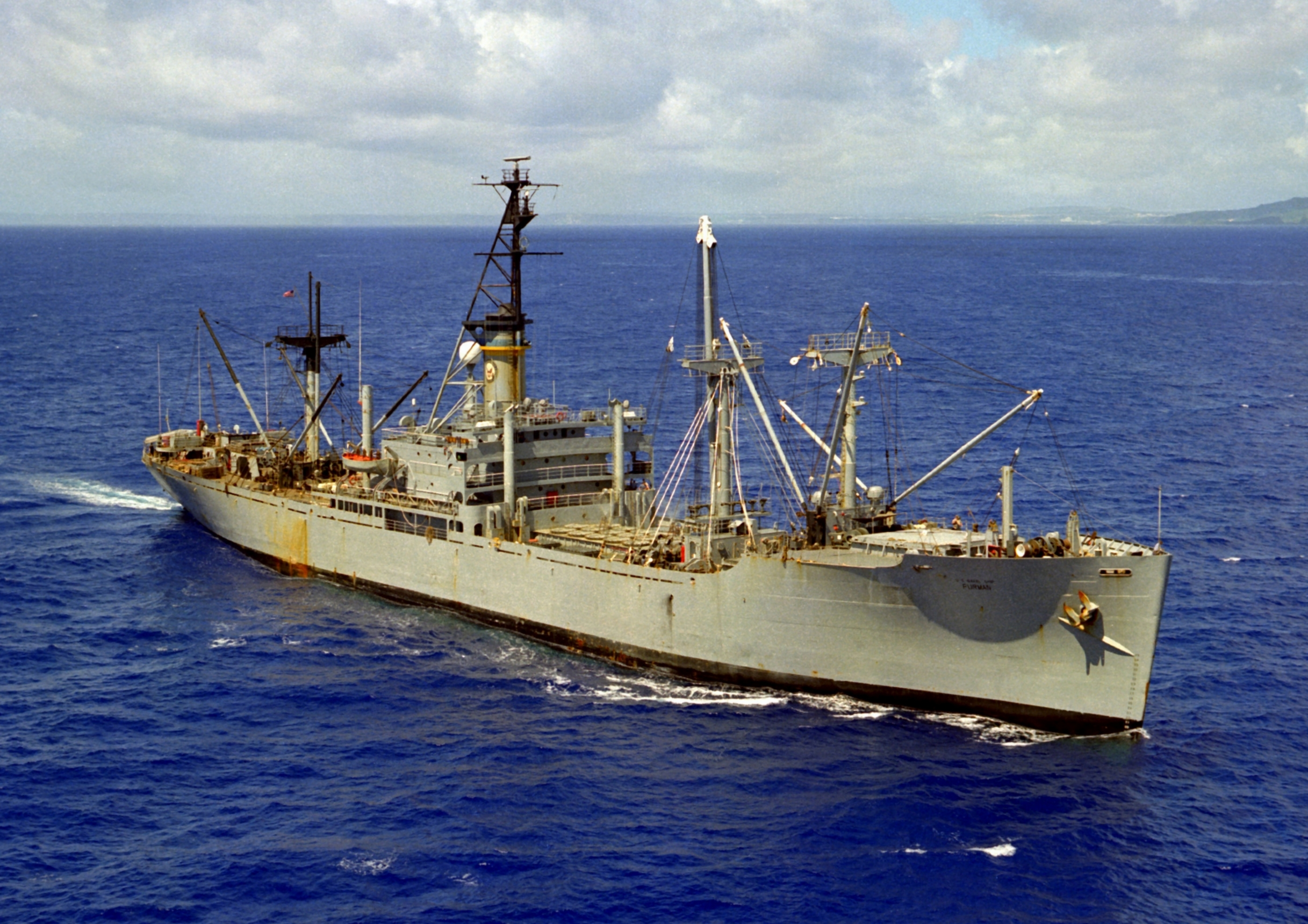
USNS Furman

Furman Victory was built by Oregon Shipbuilding Corporation. Her keel was laid on 23 January 1945. She was launched on 6 March and delivered on 19 April. Built for the WSA, she was operated under the management of Northland Transportation Company. Laid up at Beaumont in 1948. To the United States Navy in 1963, renamed Furman. Converted for naval use by American Ship Building Company, Toledo, Ohio. To the United States Maritime Administration in 1986, laid up at Beaumont. She was scrapped in 1993.
