= USS Jacob Jones (DE-130) =

1942 Edsall-class destroyer escort

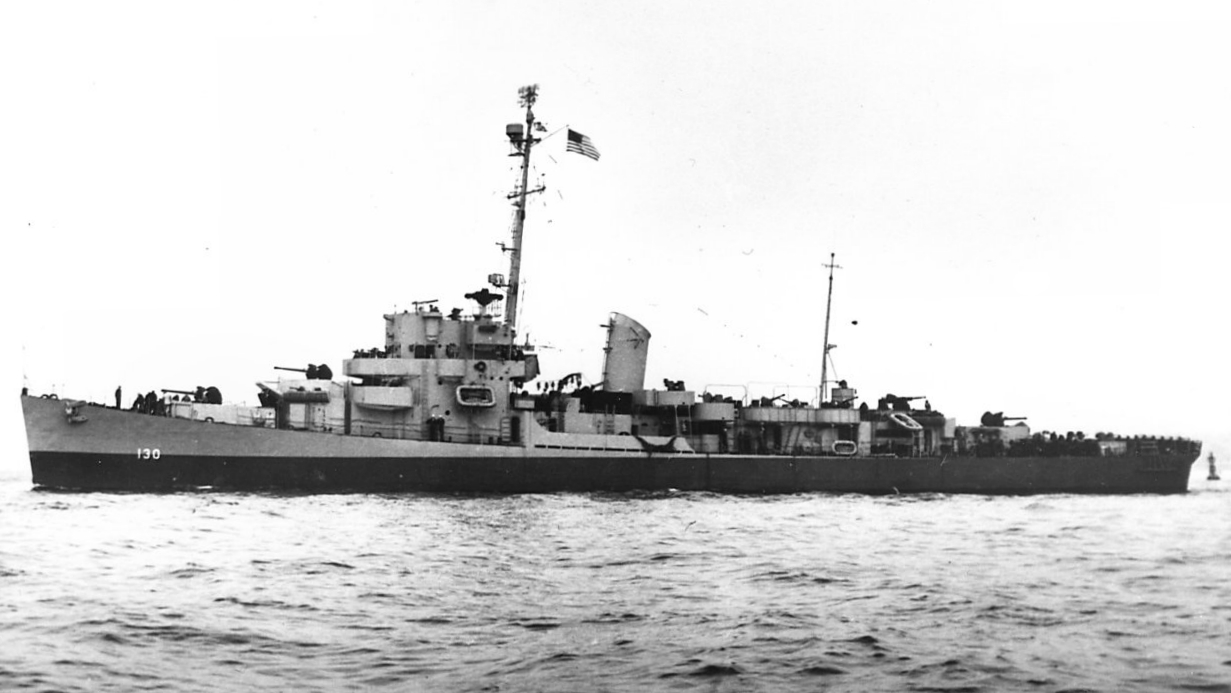

History

United States
- Name: USS Jacob Jones
- Namesake: Jacob Jones
- Builder: Consolidated Steel Corporation, Orange, Texas
- Laid down: 26 June 1942
- Launched: 29 November 1942
- Commissioned: 29 April 1943
- Decommissioned: 26 July 1946
- Stricken: 2 January 1971
- Fate: Sold 22 August 1973, scrapped

General characteristics
- Class & type: Edsall-class destroyer escort
- Displacement: 1,253 tons standard; 1,590 tons full load
- Length: 306 feet (93.27 m)
- Beam: 36.58 feet (11.15 m)
- Draft: 10.42 full load feet (3.18 m)
- Propulsion: 4 FM diesel engines, 4 diesel-generators, 6,000 shp (4.5 MW), 2 screws
- Speed: 21 knots (39 km/h)
- Range: 9,100 nmi. at 12 knots; (17,000 km at 22 km/h)
- Complement: 8 officers, 201 enlisted
- Armament: 3 × single 3 in (76 mm)/50 guns; 1 × twin 40 mm AA guns; 8 × single 20 mm AA guns; 1 × triple 21 in (533 mm) torpedo tubes; 8 × depth charge projectors; 1 × depth charge projector (hedgehog); 2 × depth charge tracks

USS Jacob Jones (DE-130) was an Edsall-class destroyer escort built for the U.S. Navy during World War II. She served in the Atlantic Ocean and provided destroyer escort service against submarine and air attack for Navy vessels and convoys.

She was named after Captain Jacob Jones, who assumed command of the Mediterranean Squadron in 1821. She was laid down 26 June 1942 by the Consolidated Steel Corp., Ltd., Orange, Texas; launched 1 November 1942; sponsored by Mrs. L. W. Hesselman; and commissioned 29 April 1943.

== World War II North Atlantic operations ==
After fitting out, Jacob Jones sailed 13 May for shakedown in Bermuda waters and arrived Charleston, South Carolina, 7 July. On the 18th she steamed to Newport, Rhode Island, to prepare for convoy duty. A week later she sailed with a convoy of U.S. Coast Guard cutters and Navy ships, which steamed to North Africa to support Allied operations in the Mediterranean. While escorting this convoy, Jacob Jones made her first antisubmarine attack 7 August firing 13 depth charges in two attacks. She arrived Casablanca, French Morocco, 13 August; a week later she departed with Task Force 64 escorting a convoy bound back to the United States.

Arriving New York 5 September, Jacob Jones underwent inspection and on the 16th departed for ASW convoy training with Hammann and Robert E. Peary at Casco, Maine. She sailed for Norfolk, Virginia, 21 September and on the 25th joined Convoy UGS-19 headed for North African waters off Casablanca. Arriving 12 October, Jacob Jones conducted ASW patrols before departing for Gibraltar to join a westbound convoy the 19th. She arrived Norfolk 6 November with the southern section of the convoy, then departed for 10 days of repairs at Brooklyn Navy Yard. On the 23d she joined a 64-ship Norfolk-to-Casablanca convoy. Upon her arrival 10 December, she patrolled waters off the coast of Africa for a week before returning to the United States with Convoy GUS-24.

== Refresher training in Maine ==
Following repairs at New York and refresher training at Casco, Maine, Jacob Jones joined Card off Cape Henry 24 January 1944. At that time the escort carrier was busy carrying troops and aircraft to Europe as part of the Allied buildup for the forthcoming invasion of Normandy. Returning to Norfolk 1 March, she resumed duty escorting convoys to England.

Jacob Jones departed New York 28 March 1944 and joined five other destroyer escorts escorting a convoy bound for Moville, Northern Ireland. Arriving 7 April, she departed Derry, Northern Ireland, six days later as one of several escorts for a 28-ship, westbound convoy that reached New York 23 April. After repairs and training, she made rendezvous 13 May with 44 merchant ships and 17 escorts for the 10-day passage to Northern Ireland and returned to New York 8 June with a westbound convoy.

For the next 12 months, Jacob Jones continued her escort duty for North Atlantic convoys. Departing from either New York or Boston, Massachusetts, she sailed as convoy escort to such ports as Derry and Moville, Northern Ireland; Liverpool, Southampton and Plymouth, England; and Le Havre and Cherbourg, France. When in the United States awaiting her next convoy, she maintained her operational readiness by training exercises in waters off Maine or Long Island. When in Europe, she operated on coastal and harbor ASW patrols. In all Jacob Jones crossed the Atlantic 20 times, providing protection for merchant and troop convoys in the North Atlantic.

== Germany surrenders ==
Three weeks and a day after Germany's unconditional surrender, Jacob Jones departed Southampton, England, and steamed in convoy for the United States. She put into New York 8 June 1945 and entered the Brooklyn Navy Yard for overdue repairs and overhaul. On 30 June she departed for Guantanamo Bay, Cuba, for two weeks of ASW and shore bombardment exercises. Steaming independently from Guantanamo 19 July, she transited the Panama Canal three days later, and sailed into San Diego, California, harbor on 31 July.

== Japan surrenders ==
As the Japanese Empire prepared to surrender, Jacob Jones departed the Destroyer Base, San Diego, California, 9 August 1945 for Pearl Harbor. She reached Pearl 16 August and commenced ASW exercises before embarking 108 passengers. On 4 September they sailed for the West Coast. She arrived San Pedro, Los Angeles, and discharged her passengers 10 September. Departing for the Panama Canal Zone two days later, she transited the canal on 20 September and arrived at Charleston, South Carolina, on 25 September.

== Post-war decommissioning ==
She steamed from Charleston on 24 October and two days later sailed up the St. Johns River, Florida, to Green Cove Springs, Florida. Jacob Jones was decommissioned on 26 July 1946 and entered the Atlantic Reserve Fleet. She was berthed at Orange, Texas, and struck from the Navy List on 2 January 1971. She was sold on 22 August 1973 and scrapped.
