= James T. Jennings =

Union Army soldier in the American Civil War

- Born: 1818; Devonshire, England
- Died: 1865 (aged 46–47); Baltimore, Maryland
- Burial place: Loudon Park National Cemetery, Baltimore
- Military career
- Allegiance: United States of America
- Branch: United States Army; Union Army
- Rank: Corporal
- Units: Company K, 56th Pennsylvania Infantry
- Conflicts: American Civil War; Battle of Globe Tavern
- Awards: Medal of Honor

James T. Jennings (April 1818 – March 22, 1865) was a Union Army soldier in the American Civil War who received the U.S. military's highest decoration, the Medal of Honor.

Jennings was born in Devonshire, England in 1818 and entered service at Bucks County, Pennsylvania. He was awarded the Medal of Honor, for extraordinary heroism shown at Weldon Railroad, Virginia on August 20, 1864, during the Battle of Globe Tavern, while serving as a Private with Company K, 56th Pennsylvania Infantry. His Medal of Honor was issued on 1 December 1864.

Jennings died at the age of 46, on March 22, 1865, and was buried at Loudon Park National Cemetery in Baltimore.

== Medal of Honor citation ==
The President of the United States of America, in the name of Congress, takes pleasure in presenting the Medal of Honor to Private James T. Jennings, United States Army, for extraordinary heroism on 20 August 1864, while serving with Company K, 56th Pennsylvania Infantry, in action at Weldon Railroad, Virginia, for capture of flag of 55th North Carolina Infantry (Confederate States of America).
