= Henry Newman (Medal of Honor) =

German-born soldier in the U.S. Army

- Born: c. 1845; Germany
- Died: July 13, 1915 (aged 70); Baltimore, Maryland, United States
- Burial place: Loudon Park National Cemetery
- Military career
- Allegiance: United States of America
- Branch: United States Army
- Service years: c. 1872–1874
- Rank: First Sergeant
- Unit: 5th U.S. Cavalry
- Conflicts: Indian Wars; Apache Wars
- Awards: Medal of Honor

Henry Newman (c. 1845 – July 13, 1915) was a German-born soldier in the U.S. Army who served with the 5th U.S. Cavalry during the Indian Wars. In the Apache Wars, he was one of three men who received the Medal of Honor for gallantry against a hostile band of Apache Indians in the Whetstone Mountains of Arizona on July 13, 1872.

== Biography ==
Henry Newman was born in the German Confederation in about 1845. He later emigrated to the United States and enlisted in the U.S. Army in Cincinnati, Ohio. Assigned to frontier duty with the 5th U.S. Cavalry, he took part in the Apache Wars during the early 1870s and eventually rose to the rank of first sergeant.

On July 13, 1872, Newman set off from Camp Crittenden with a small cavalry detachment under the command of Second Lieutenant William P. Hall to pursue an Apache raiding party that had stolen cattle from a local Mexican rancher. They pursued the Apaches fifteen miles into a canyon in the Whetstone Mountains and encountered a much larger force then they had expected. Though they attempted to surprise the Apache, the troopers were spotted and the hostiles charged. The Apache also began dropping boulders from as high as 800 feet, injuring several cavalrymen and their horses. Outnumbered and unable to mount a successful defence as long as the Apache were concealed in the canyon, Hall ordered a retreat. As second-in-command, Newman volunteered to stay behind with Hall and Private Michael Glynn to cover the retreat so the wounded could be taken to safety.

For his actions, Newman received the Medal of Honor for gallantry, along with Privates Glynn and John Nihill, on December 4, 1874. He died in Baltimore, Maryland on July 13, 1915, and was buried in Loudon Park National Cemetery.

== Medal of Honor citation ==
Rank and organization: First Sergeant, Company F, 5th U.S. Cavalry. Place and date: At Whetstone Mountains, Ariz., 13 July 1872. Entered service at: ------. Birth: Germany. Date of issue: 4 December 1874.

Citation:

He and 2 companions covered the withdrawal of wounded comrades from the fire of an Apache band well concealed among rocks.

== See also ==
- List of Medal of Honor recipients for the Indian Wars
