= SS Frontenac Victory =

Victory ship of the United States

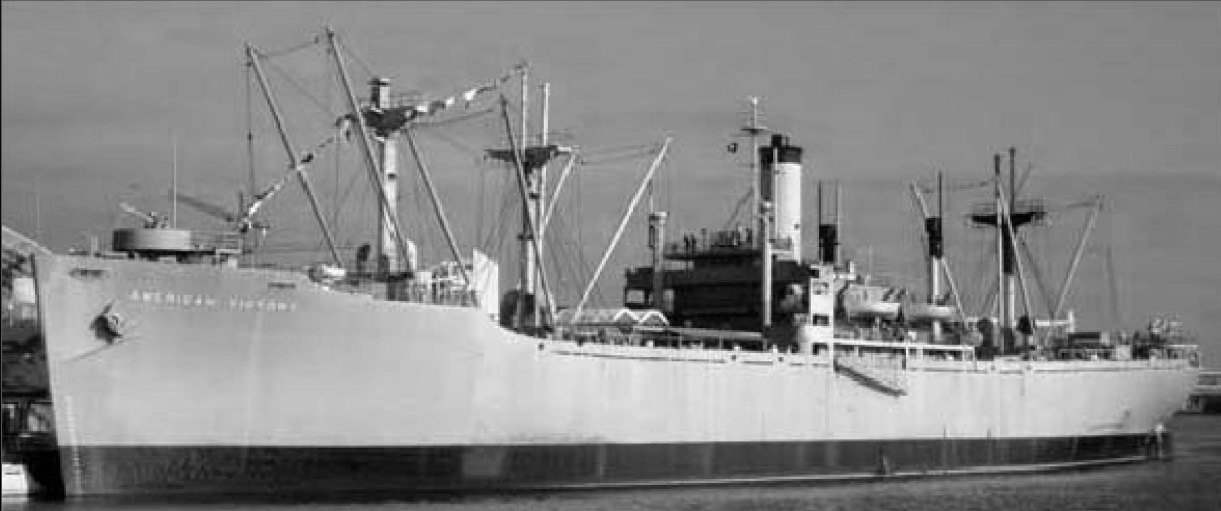
- VC2-S-AP2 type Victory ship

History

United States
- Name: SS Frontenac Victory
- Namesake: Frontenac, Missouri
- Owner: War Shipping Administration
- Operator: Agwilines Inc
- Builder: Bethlehem-Fairfield Shipyard Corp. Baltimore, Maryland
- Laid down: November 16, 1944
- Launched: January 18, 1945
- Completed: February 14, 1945
- Identification: IMO number: 5121988
- Nickname(s): victory
- Fate: Scrapped in 1973

General characteristics
- Class & type: VC2-S-AP3 Victory ship
- Tonnage: 7,612 GRT; 4,553 NRT
- Displacement: 15,200 tons
- Length: 455 ft (139 m)
- Beam: 62 ft (19 m)
- Draught: 28 ft (8.5 m)
- Installed power: 8,500 shp (6,300 kW)
- Propulsion: HP & LP turbines geared to a single 20.5 ft (6.2 m) propeller
- Speed: 16.5 knots (30.6 km/h; 19.0 mph)
- Boats & landing craft carried: 4 Lifeboats
- Complement: 62 Merchant Marine and 28 US Naval Armed Guards
- Armament: 1 × 5 in (127 mm)/38 caliber gun; 1 × 3 in (76 mm)/50 caliber gun; 8 × 20 mm Oerlikon

SS Frontenac Victory was a Victory ship built for the United States War Shipping Administration late in World War II under the Emergency Shipbuilding program. It saw service in the European Theater of Operations in the Atlantic Ocean during 1945, and in the immediate post-war period. SS Frontenac Victory was part of the series of Victory ships named after cities; this particular ship was named after the city of Frontenac, Missouri. It was a type VC2-S-AP2/WSAT cargo ship with the U.S. Maritime Commission (MARCOM), "Victory" (MCV) hull number 625, shipyard number 1597, and built by Bethlehem Shipbuilding Corporation in Baltimore, Maryland.

SS Frontenac Victory was one of many new 10,500-ton vessels to be known as Victory ships, designed to replace the earlier Liberty ships. Liberty ships were designed to be used solely for World War II, whereas Victory ships were designed to last longer and to serve the US Navy after the war. Victory ships differed from Liberty ships in that they were faster, longer, wider, taller, had a thinner stack set farther toward the superstructure and had a long raised forecastle.

== World War II ==
On March 1, 1945, Frontenac Victory collided with the gasoline tanker SS Lone Jack in the Atlantic. The two ships had departed from the US with supplies for the war in Europe, when they collided at 37.42N 57.53W, about 1,000 miles (1,600 km) east of Virginia. Their distress calls were heard by a convoy returning to New York City. The convoy was about 150 nautical miles (280 km; 170 mi) away and its task group commander, Captain Poole, sent two of the convoy's destroyer escorts: USS Hammann and USS Robert E. Peary.

Frontenac Victory had a 30-foot (9.1 m) hole in her bow, but did not sink. Lone Jack had a 30-foot-square (9.1 m) hole in her side, causing her steam engine room to flood. Due to rough seas, the destroyer escorts could not help the ships when they arrived, other than to protect them from potential enemy U-boats. Late in the afternoon of March 2, the captain of Lone Jack gave the order to abandon ship as the tanker had no power and was adrift.

On March 3, Lone Jack was still afloat and a team from USS Hammann was sent to check its seaworthiness. After examination, it was declared she was worth saving, though she was low in the water. Two salvage tugs, USS Kiowa and USS Escape, towed Lone Jack back to port. USS Hammann escorted the three ships back to the US.

Frontenac Victory returned to the US under her own power, and under the protection of USS Robert E. Peary. Frontenac Victory was repaired and put back in service.

== War relief and Seacowboys ==
In 1946, after World War II, Frontenac Victory was converted to a livestock ship, also called a cowboy ship. From 1945 to 1947, the United Nations Relief and Rehabilitation Administration and the Brethren Service Committee of the Church of the Brethren sent livestock to war-torn countries. These "seagoing cowboys" made about 360 trips on 73 different ships. The Heifers for Relief project was started by the Church of the Brethren in 1942; in 1953, this became Heifer International. Frontenac Victory made four trips moving horses, heifers, and mules, as well as some chicks, rabbits, and goats. Her trips were to Greece, Poland and Yugoslavia.

After the war, in 1947, Frontenac Victory was laid up at James River as part of the National Defense Reserve Fleet.

== Korean War ==
SS Frontenac Victory served as a merchant marine ship supplying goods for the Korean War. About 75 percent of the personnel serving in the Korean War and 90 percent of cargo to the war zone was delivered by merchant marine ships. SS Frontenac Victory transported goods, mail, food, and other supplies, making 11 trips between 1951 and 1952. Frontenac Victory participated in the Hungnam redeployment and took supplies to Pusan, Korea.

On December 21, 1952, the Liberty ship SS Quartette steamed through the Northwestern Hawaiian Islands when high winds and rough seas pushed her onto a coral reef, damaging the two forward cargo holds. On December 22, Frontenac Victory rescued its crew of 36. Quartette had been bound for Pusan with 11,250 tons of milo yellow grain.

== Vietnam War ==
In 1966 Frontenac Victory was reactivated for the Vietnam War and was operated by the Weyerhaeuser Steamship Company. In 1973, after the war, she was laid up at Suisun Bay's National Defense Reserve Fleet. In 1985 she was scrapped at Kaohsiung, Taiwan.

== See also ==
- List of Victory ships
- Liberty ship
- Type C1 ship
- Type C2 ship
- Type C3 ship

== Sources ==
- Sawyer, L.A. and W.H. Mitchell. Victory ships and tankers: The history of the 'Victory' type cargo ships and of the tankers built in the United States of America during World War II, Cornell Maritime Press, 1974, 0-87033-182-5.
- United States Maritime Commission:
- Victory Cargo Ships
