= Loudon Park National Cemetery =

Historic cemetery in Baltimore, Maryland

- U.S. National Register of Historic Places
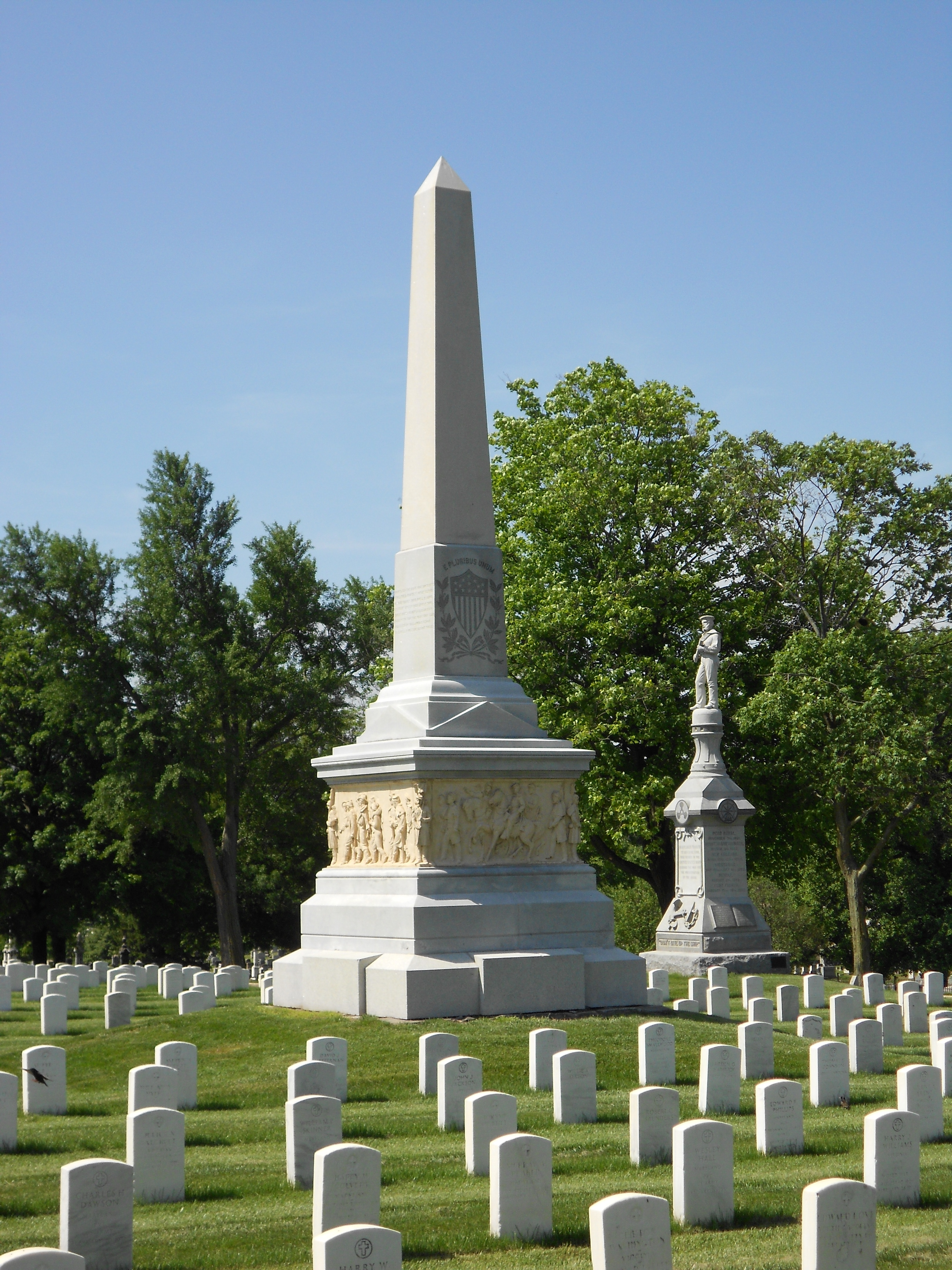
- The Maryland Sons Monument in Loudon Park National Cemetery

- Location within Baltimore Location within Maryland Location within the United States
- Location: 3445 Frederick Ave., Baltimore, Maryland
- Coordinates: 39°16′49″N 76°40′30″W
- Built: 1862
- Architect: Meigs, Montgomery C.
- Architectural style: Second Empire
- MPS: Civil War Era National Cemeteries MPS
- NRHP reference No.: 96000655
- Added to NRHP: June 20, 1996

Loudon Park National Cemetery is a United States National Cemetery located in the city of Baltimore, Maryland. Administered by the United States Department of Veterans Affairs, it encompasses 5.2 acres (2.1 ha), and as of the end of 2005, had 7,138 interments. It is currently closed to new interments, and is maintained by the Baltimore National Cemetery. The cemetery's Civil War interments include about 2,300 Union soldiers and 650 Confederate soldiers.

== History ==
Loudon Park National Cemetery was originally established as a plot within the Loudon Park Cemetery. It was one of the 14 original National Cemeteries established under the National Cemetery Act on July 17, 1862. Most of the original interments were from area veteran hospitals. During the American Civil War, Fort McHenry was a prisoner of war camp, and the prisoners who died while incarcerated there were interred at Loudon Park National Cemetery.

Land acquisitions in 1874, 1875, 1882, 1883 and lastly in 1903, brought the cemetery to its current size.

Loudon Park National Cemetery was placed on the National Register of Historic Places in 1996.

== Notable monuments ==
- The Maryland Sons Monument, a three-foot-tall terra cotta frieze with a bas relief sculpture. Dedicated in 1885.
- Rigby Monument, a marble monument erected in 1891 dedicated to Captain James H. Rigby and the 1st Maryland Light Artillery.
- The Unknown Dead Monument, a marble sculpture, dedicated in 1895.
- The Maryland Naval Monument, dedicated in 1896.
- The Confederate Monument, erected in 1912, marking the burial place of Confederate prisoners of war.

== Notable interments ==
- Medal of Honor recipients
  - Private Henry G. Costin, for action during World War I
  - Private James T. Jennings, for action during the American Civil War
  - First Sergeant Henry Newman, for action in Arizona Territory during the Indian Wars
  - First Sergeant Wilhelm O. Philipsen, for action in the Colorado Territory during the Indian Wars
  - Sergeant William Taylor, two-time recipient for action during the Civil War
