= William Taylor (Medal of Honor) =

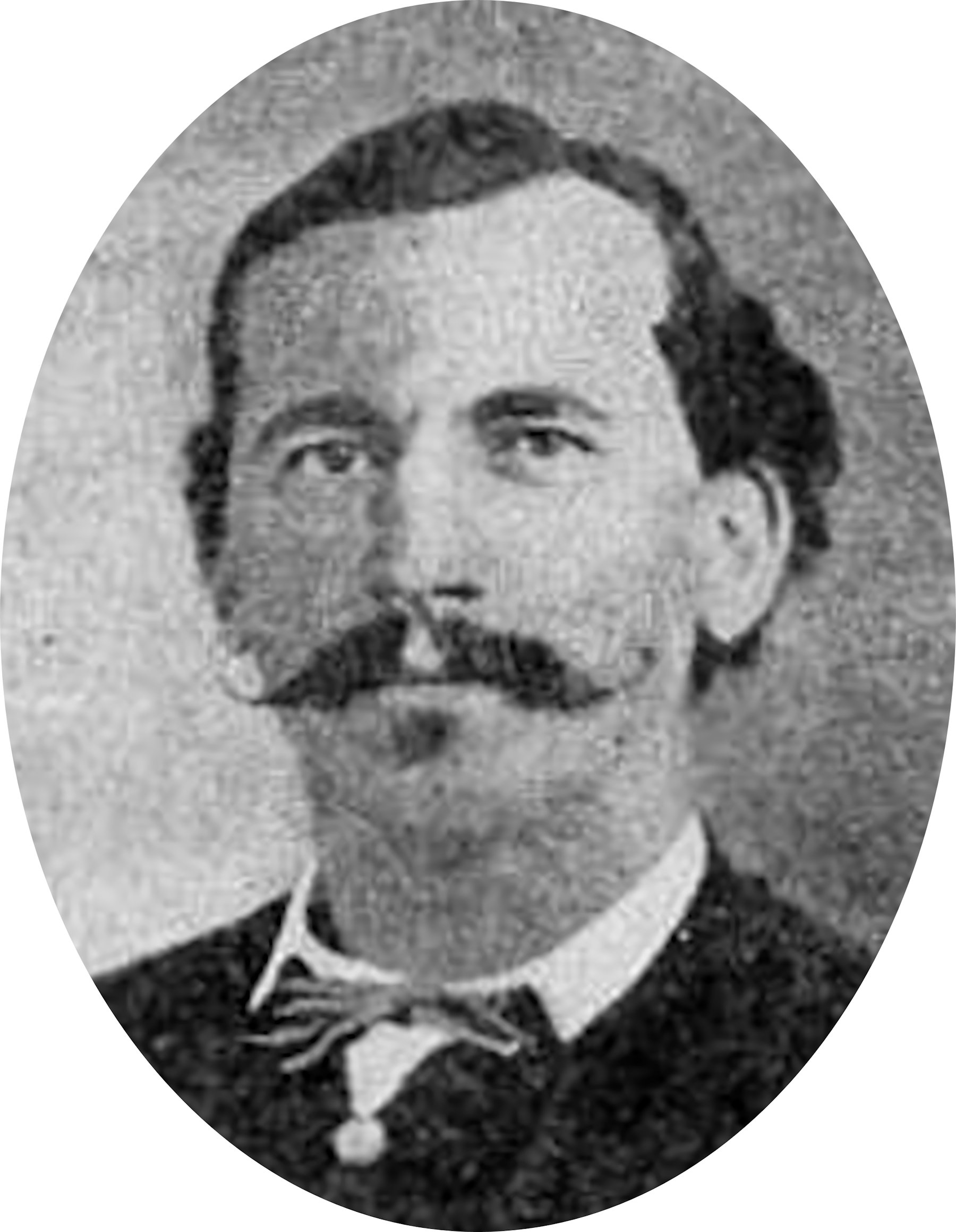
- Born: 1836; Washington, D.C., US
- Died: April 6, 1902 (aged 65–66); Baltimore, Maryland, US
- Burial place: Loudon Park National Cemetery
- Military career
- Allegiance: United States
- Branch: US Army; Union Army
- Service years: 1861 - 1865
- Rank: Captain
- Unit: 1st Maryland Infantry Regiment
- Conflicts: American Civil War • Battle of Front Royal • Battle of Globe Tavern
- Awards: Medal of Honor

William Taylor (1836 – April 6, 1902) was a Union Army soldier and officer during the American Civil War. He received the Medal of Honor for gallantry during two separate Virginia engagements. The Battle of Front Royal in 1862 and the Battle of Globe Tavern in 1864.

== Civil War service ==
Taylor began his military service on May 27, 1861 as a sergeant in Company H of the First Maryland Infantry Regiment. During the Battle of Front Royal with Company H on May 23, 1862, he burned a bridge to block the Confederate advance. His first Medal of Honor was awarded for bravery in this action, in which he was wounded in the right hand. He was promoted to the rank of second lieutenant of Company C in the same regiment on April 12, 1863.

While serving with Company M in the Battle of Globe Tavern on August 19, 1864, Lieutenant Taylor was captured during a reconnaissance mission behind enemy lines. His second Medal of Honor was awarded for this mission. After two months of imprisonment at the Confederate Libby Prison, Taylor and two other officers escaped and rejoined Union forces.

During the Siege of Petersburg, Taylor was shot in the leg on August 14, 1864 while carrying the colors after other standard bearers had fallen to enemy fire. He survived the battle, never fully recovered from the wound.

Taylor became captain of Company E on June 7, 1865 and mustered out with his company on July 2, 1865.

== Medal of Honor citation ==
The President of the United States of America, in the name of Congress, takes pleasure in presenting the Medal of Honor to Sergeant & Second Lieutenant William Taylor, United States Army, for extraordinary heroism while serving with Company H, 1st Maryland Infantry as a sergeant, at Front Royal, Virginia, 23 May 1862. William Taylor was painfully wounded while obeying an order to burn a bridge, but, persevering in the attempt, he burned the bridge and prevented its use by the enemy. Later, on 19 August 1864, at Weldon Railroad, Virginia, then a lieutenant serving with Company M, he voluntarily took the place of a disabled officer and undertook a hazardous reconnaissance beyond the lines of the army; was taken prisoner in the attempt."

The Medal of Honor was awarded to Taylor on August 2, 1897.

== See also ==
- List of Medal of Honor recipients
- List of American Civil War Medal of Honor recipients: T–Z
