= USNS Lone Jack =

History

United States
- Name: USNS Lone Jack
- Builder: Sun Shipbuilding & Drydock Co., Chester, Pennsylvania
- Laid down: 11 July 1944
- Launched: 21 October 1944
- Acquired: 28 November 1956
- In service: 15 January 1957
- Out of service: 7 October 1957
- Stricken: 7 October 1957
- Fate: Transferred to the US Army, 10 June 1966; Scrapped, April 1971

General characteristics
- Type: Cumberland-class fleet oiler
- Displacement: 5,782 long tons (5,875 t) light; 21,880 long tons (22,231 t) full
- Length: 523 ft 6 in (159.56 m)
- Beam: 68 ft (21 m)
- Draft: 30 ft (9.1 m)
- Propulsion: Turbo-electric, single screw, 8,000 hp (5,966 kW)
- Speed: 15 knots (28 km/h; 17 mph)
- Capacity: 140,000 barrels (22,000 m^{3})
- Armament: None

USNS Lone Jack (T-AO-161) was a type Type T2-SE-A1 tanker laid down under Maritime Commission contract (USMC number 1783) by the Sun Shipbuilding & Dry Dock Co. of Chester, Pennsylvania (hull number 450) on 11 July 1944. The ship was launched on 21 October 1944, sponsored by Mrs. Julia W. Bruwier, and delivered to Cities Service Oil Co. of New York City on 31 October 1944.

== Service history ==
=== Merchant tanker, 1944–1956 ===
During and after World War II SS Lone Jack steamed the sealanes as a merchant tanker. On 1 March 1945 the Lone Jack collided with a convoy cargo merchant ship the SS Frontenac Victory. The two damaged ships were helped and protected by destroyer escorts: USS Burrows (DE-105), USS Hammann (DE-131) and USS Robert E. Peary (DE-132) take came a different convoy. Both ships were able to stay afloat and were later repaired and put back in service. The Lone Jack had major damage and was towed by the salvage tugs the USS Kiowa (AT-72) and USS Escape (ARS-6) to a repair port. Her fuel was removed to another ship before the repair. Prior to 1956 she was acquired by the Maritime Administration as a "trade in" ship and was placed in the National Defense Reserve Fleet at Beaumont, Texas.

=== Suez Crisis activation, 1956–1957 ===
After the opening of hostilities between Great Britain, France, and Israel on one side and Egypt on the other late in October 1956, the United States moved to stabilize this dangerous threat to world peace in the Middle East. The 6th Fleet steamed to the eastern Mediterranean, and following the closing of the Suez Canal on 1 November, the Maritime Administration reactivated Lone Jack for emergency tanker service. Acquired by the Navy on 28 November, she was transferred to Military Sea Transportation Service at New Orleans, Louisiana, placed in service as USNS Lone Jack (T-AO-161), on 15 January 1957.

Lone Jack was operated under General Agency Agreement by Marine Transport Lines, Inc., of New York City. From January to October 1957 she carried oil shipments from ports in the Persian Gulf to American bases in Japan and the western Pacific. During April and May she circumnavigated the globe while carrying fuel to the Mediterranean and the Far East.

=== In reserve and transfer to the Army, 1957–1966 ===
Lone Jack was placed out of service, struck from the Naval Vessel Register, and transferred to the Maritime Administration on 7 October 1957, she entered the Maritime Reserve Fleet at Olympia, Washington. On 10 June 1966 she was transferred to the Army for use as a floating power station along the coast of South Vietnam. Lone Jack was broken up at Kaohsiung, Taiwan, in April 1971.
