= Wilhelm O. Philipsen =

Wilhelm O. Philipsen (1852–1913), a recipient of the Medal of Honor, served as a blacksmith in Company D of the U.S. Army’s 5th Cavalry Regiment during the Battle of Milk Creek in 1879. He was among 10 cavalrymen who volunteered to form a skirmish line on September 29, 1879, while Company D retreated from an attack by the White River Utes. Philipsen and the other volunteers were awarded the Medal of Honor for bravery in defending their unit during this retreat.

His gravestone at Loudon Park National Cemetery, in Baltimore, indicates Philipsen achieved the rank of First Sergeant during his career in the Army. He was born in 1852 on the Denmark side of Schleswig and died on September 15, 1913. His remains are among five Medal of Honor recipients at Loudon Park.

== See also ==
- Meeker Massacre
- Battle of Milk Creek
