= Henry Gilbert Costin =

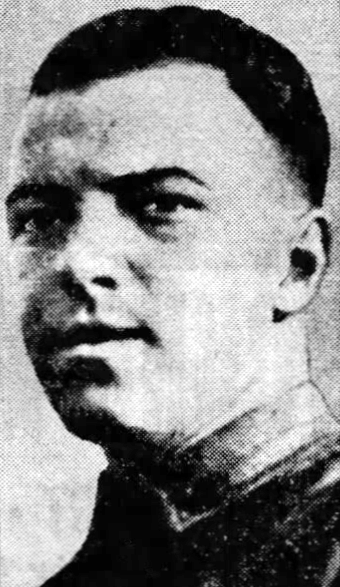
- Henry Gilbert Costin
- Born: June 15, 1898; Baltimore, Maryland, US
- Died: October 8, 1918 (aged 20); Bois de Consenvoye, France
- Burial place: Loudon Park National Cemetery; Baltimore, Maryland
- Military career
- Allegiance: United States
- Branch: United States Army
- Service years: 1917–1918
- Rank: Private
- Service number: 1285528
- Units: Company H, 115th Infantry Regiment, 29th Division.
- Conflicts: World War I
- Awards: Medal of Honor

Henry Gilbert Costin (June 15, 1898 – October 8, 1918) was a private in the United States Army who received the Medal of Honor for his actions in World War I near Bois–de–Consenvoye, France during the Meuse–Argonne offensive.

== Biography ==
Costin was born June 15, 1898, in Baltimore, Maryland, and graduated from the Baltimore City College high school in 1914. After enlisting in the Army in 1917, Costin fought in France in World War I. On October 8, 1918, near Bois–de–Consenvoye, he was killed while performing an act of heroism for which he was awarded the Medal of Honor, the United States' highest military commendation. His body is buried in Loudon Park National Cemetery (section B, grave 460) in Baltimore, Maryland.

== Medal of Honor citation ==
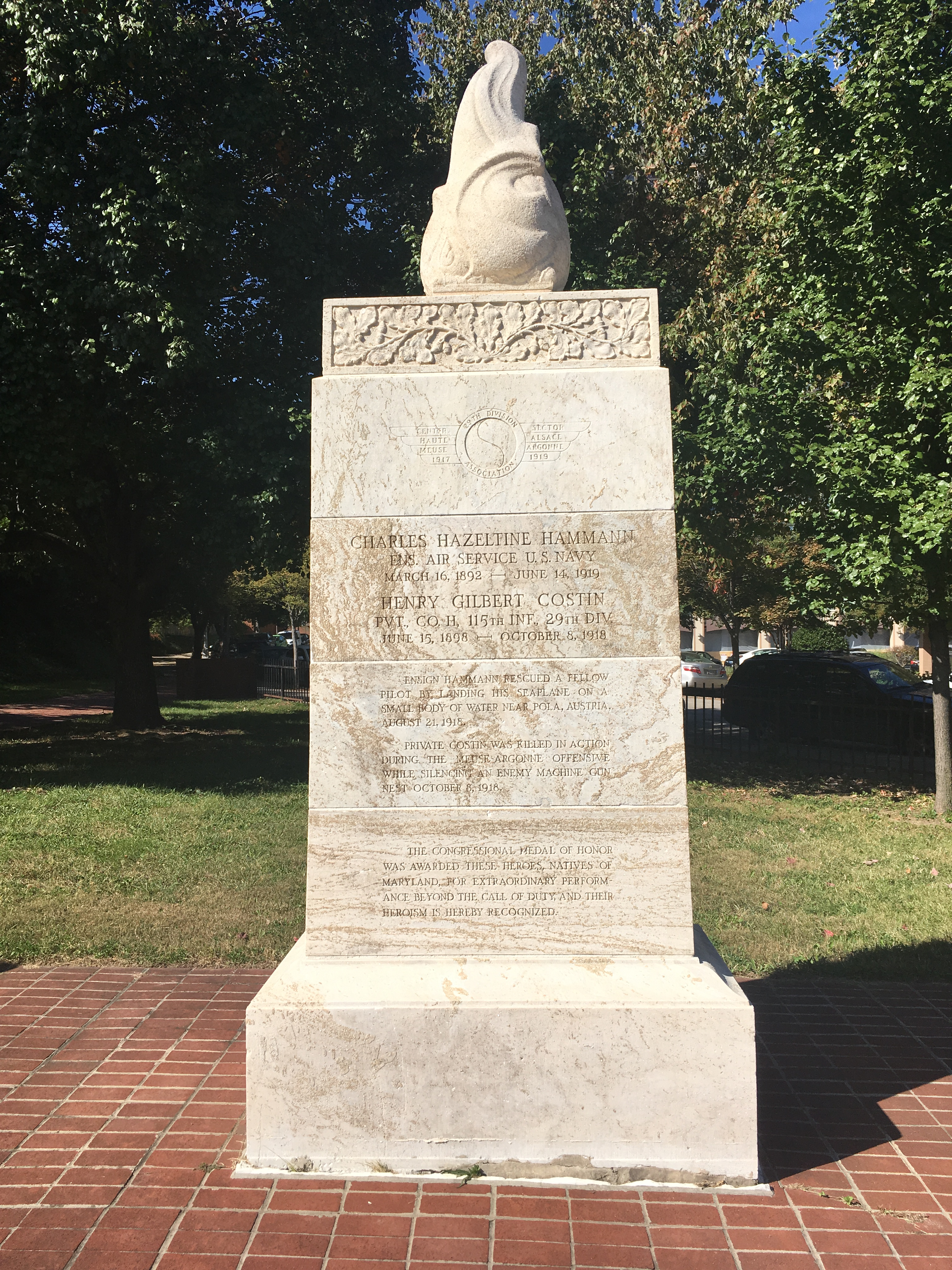
Memorial honoring Medal of Honor recipients Henry G. Costin and Charles Hammann, both of Baltimore, in Congressional Medal of Honor Park, Bolton Hill, Baltimore

Rank and organization: Private, U.S. Army, Company H, 115th Infantry, 29th Division. Place and date: Near Bois–de–Consenvoye, France, 8 October 1918. Entered service at: Baltimore, Md. Birth: Baltimore, Md. G.O. No.: 34, W.D., 1919.

Citation:

When the advance of his platoon had been held up by machinegun fire and a request was made for an automatic rifle team to charge the nest, Pvt. Costin was the first to volunteer. Advancing with his team, under terrific fire of enemy artillery, machineguns, and trench mortars, he continued after all his comrades had become casualties and he himself had been seriously wounded. He operated his rifle until he collapsed. His act resulted in the capture of about 100 prisoners and several machineguns. He succumbed from the effects of his wounds shortly after the accomplishment of his heroic deed.

== Namesake ==
The Liberty Ship SS Henry Gilbert Costin (Maritime Commission Hull Number 0950, U.S. Merchant Marine Association), built at the Bethlehem-Fairfield Shipyard, in Baltimore, Maryland, in 1943, was named for Costin and used for cargo transport during World War II.

Also named in honor of Costin are the PVT Henry Costin National Guard Armory at 8601 Odell Road in Laurel, Maryland, and the PVT Henry Costin Dining Facility on Omaha Beach Circle at the Camp Fretterd Military Reservation in Reisterstown, Maryland (Maryland Army National Guard).

== See also ==
- List of Medal of Honor recipients
- List of Medal of Honor recipients for World War I
