= USS Robert E. Peary (DE-132) =

1943 Edsall-class destroyer escort

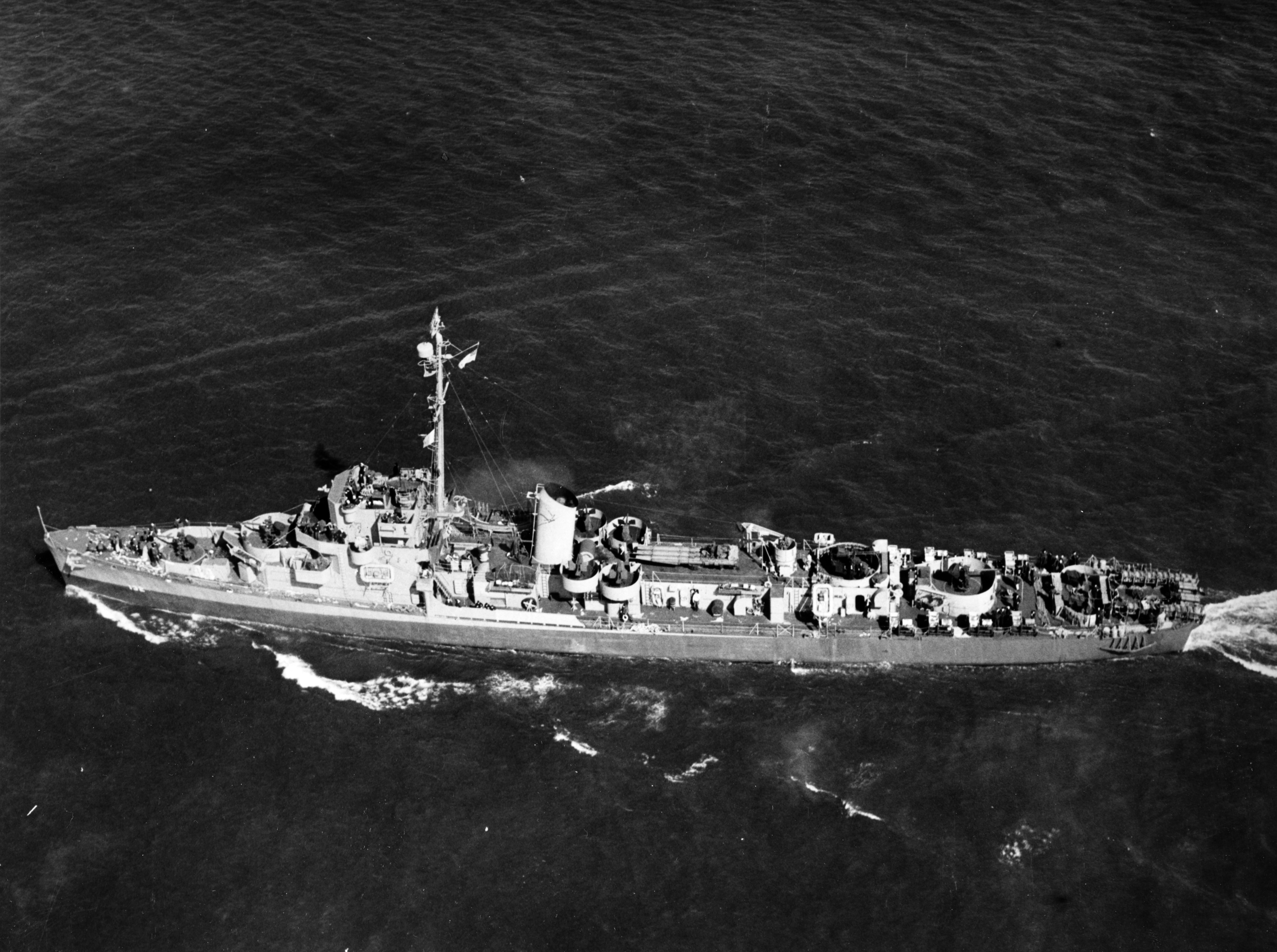
- Robert E. Peary on 25 March 1944

History

United States
- Namesake: Robert E. Peary
- Builder: Consolidated Steel Corporation, Orange, Texas
- Laid down: 30 June 1942
- Launched: 3 January 1943
- Commissioned: 31 May 1943
- Decommissioned: 13 June 1947
- Stricken: 1 July 1966
- Fate: Sold 6 September 1967, scrapped

General characteristics
- Class & type: Edsall-class destroyer escort
- Displacement: 1,253 tons standard; 1,590 tons full load
- Length: 306 feet (93.27 m)
- Beam: 36.58 feet (11.15 m)
- Draft: 10.42 full load feet (3.18 m)
- Propulsion: 4 FM diesel engines, 4 diesel-generators, 6,000 shp (4.5 MW), 2 screws
- Speed: 21 knots (39 km/h)
- Range: 9,100 nmi. at 12 knots; (17,000 km at 22 km/h)
- Complement: 8 officers, 201 enlisted
- Armament: 3 × single 3 in (76 mm)/50 guns; 1 × twin 40 mm AA guns; 8 × single 20 mm AA guns; 1 × triple 21 in (533 mm) torpedo tubes; 8 × depth charge projectors; 1 × depth charge projector (hedgehog); 2 × depth charge tracks

USS Robert E. Peary (DE-132) was an Edsall-class destroyer escort in service with the United States Navy from 1943 to 1947. She was sold for scrap in 1967.

== History ==
The ship was named after Robert E. Peary, the famous Arctic explorer and laid down 30 June 1942 by the Consolidated Steel Co., Orange, Texas; launched 3 January 1943; sponsored by Mrs. Robert Edwin Peary; and commissioned 31 May 1943.

=== Battle of the Atlantic ===
Following shakedown off Bermuda, Robert E. Peary made her first run as a convoy escort to North Africa, arriving at Casablanca 13 August. By the end of the year, she had made two more runs to Casablanca, and was returning to New York with her third westbound convoy.

Early in 1944, Robert E. Peary crossed the Atlantic with a "hunter-killer" group, and upon returning to the United States shifted to the northern sealanes. Between 28 March 1944 and 7 June 1945, she escorted 10 convoys to the United Kingdom and, after June 1944, to France.

While returning to New York on 2 March 1945, Robert E. Peary and Hammann were diverted to aid two merchant ships which had collided. After the destroyer escorts rescued survivors, Hammann stood by SS Lone Jack, while Robert E. Peary escorted SS Frontenac Victory to New York, arriving on the 6th.

Ordered to the U.S. Pacific Fleet on completion of her last Atlantic Ocean run on 7 June 1945, Robert E. Peary underwent overhaul and was en route to the Pacific when the war with Japan ended. Redirected to New London, Connecticut, for duty with the Medical Research Department, she conducted binocular experiments, then, proceeded to Green Cove Springs, Florida.

=== Decommissioning and fate ===
She arrived in Florida on 11 January 1946 and decommissioned 13 June 1947. Transferred to the Norfolk, Virginia, berthing area in 1959, she remained in the Atlantic Reserve Fleet until struck from the Navy Directory 1 July 1966. She was sold to Lipsett, Inc., New York, New York, 6 September 1967.
