= Battery A, Maryland Light Artillery =

- Active: August 1861 - March 11, 1865
- Country: United States
- Allegiance: Union
- Branch: Artillery & Infantry
- Engagements: Peninsula Campaign; Seven Days Battles; Battle of Beaver Dam Creek; Battle of Savage's Station; Battle of White Oak Swamp; Battle of Malvern Hill; Battle of South Mountain; Battle of Antietam; Battle of Fredericksburg; Battle of Chancellorsville; Battle of Gettysburg; Bristoe Campaign; Mine Run Campaign; Battle of Fort Stevens

The Battery A, Maryland Light Artillery, was an artillery battery that served in the Union Army during the American Civil War. It briefly served as infantry from July 3, 1864 until March 11, 1865. The battery was primarily commanded by James H. Rigby and was known as "Rigby's Battery".

== Service ==
The battery was organized Baltimore and Pikesville, Maryland August through September 1861 for a three-year enlistment under the command of Captain John W. Wolcott.

The battery was attached to Dix's Command, Baltimore, Maryland, to May 1862. 4th Brigade, Artillery Reserve, V Corps, Army of the Potomac, to September 1862. Artillery, 1st Division, VI Corps, to May 1863. 4th Volunteer Brigade, Artillery Reserve, Army of the Potomac, to July 1863. 3rd Volunteer Brigade, Artillery Reserve, Army of the Potomac, to October 1863. Artillery Brigade, I Corps, Army of the Potomac, to March 1864. Camp Barry, Defenses of Washington, XXII Corps, to May 1864. 1st Brigade, DeRussy's Division, XXII Corps, to July 1864. Reserve Division, Harpers Ferry, West Virginia, to January 1865. 3rd Brigade, 3rd Division, West Virginia, to March 1865.

Battery A, Maryland Light Artillery ceased to exist on March 11, 1865 when it was consolidated with Battery B, Maryland Light Artillery.

== Detailed service ==
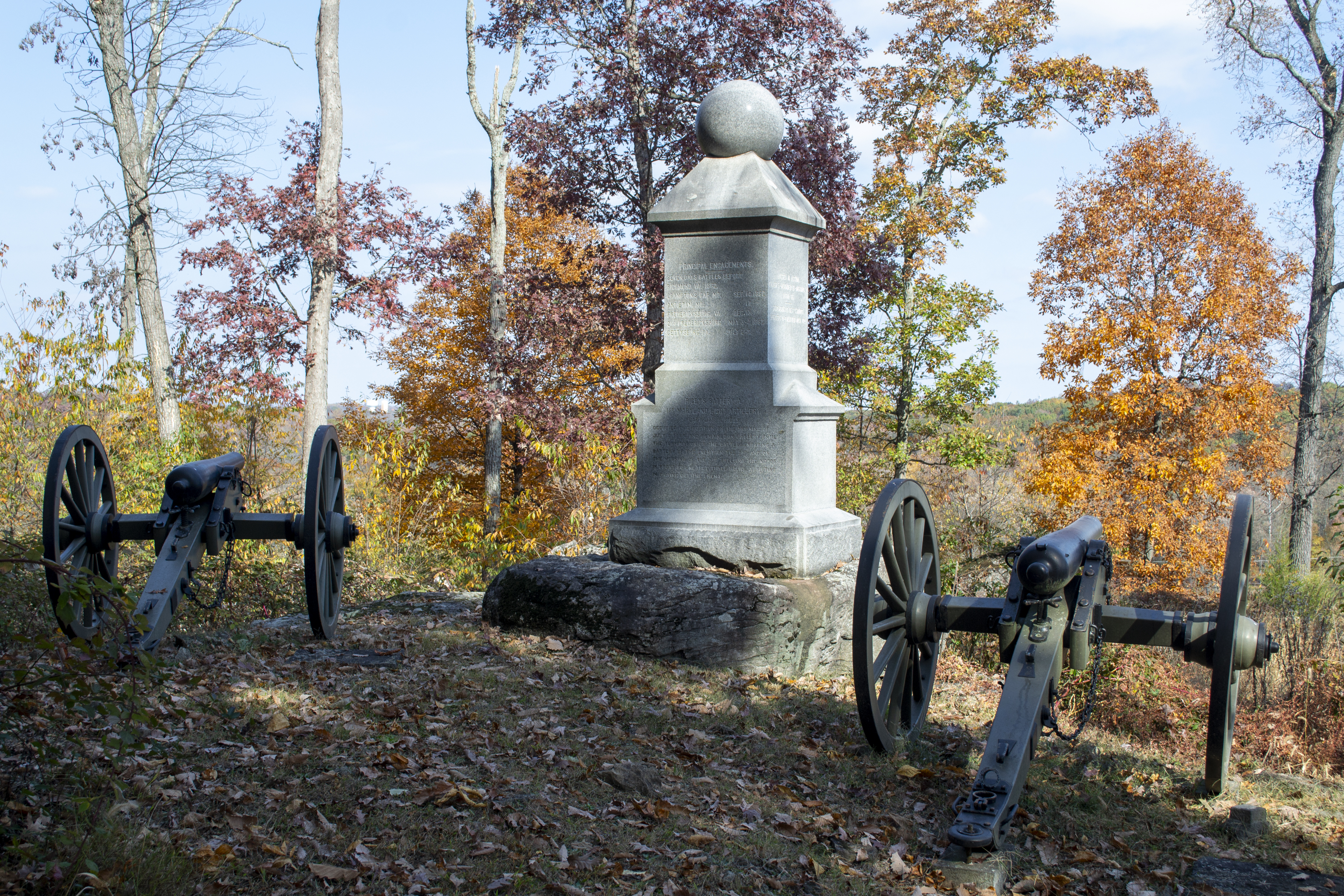
Monument at Gettysburg. Protecting the south-eastern flank of the Union line.

Duty at Baltimore, Md., and on the eastern shore of Maryland until May 1862. Joined the Army of the Potomac on the Virginia Peninsula. Peninsula Campaign June to August. Seven Days Battles before Richmond June 25-July 1. Battles of Mechanicsville June 26. Savage's Station June 29. White Oak Swamp June 30. Malvern Hill July 1. At Harrison's Landing till August 15. Movement to Fort Monroe and Alexandria August 15–22. Maryland Campaign September 6–22. Battle South Mountain, Md., September 14. Antietam September 16–17. At Downsville, Md., till October 29. Movement to Falmouth, Va., October 29-November 19. Battle of Fredericksburg, Va., December 12–15. "Mud March" January 20–24, 1863. At White Oak Church till April 27. Chancellorsville Campaign April 27-May 6. Operations at Franklin's Crossing April 29-May 2. Battle of Maryes Heights, Fredericksburg, May 3. Salem Heights May 3–4. Banks' Ford May 4. Gettysburg Campaign June II-July 24. Battle of Gettysburg July 1–3. Duty on line of the Rappahannock and Rapidan till October. Bristoe Campaign October 9–22. Advance to line of the Rappahannock November 7–8, Mine Run Campaign November 26-December 2. Demonstration on the Rapidan February 6–7, 1864. Morton's Ford February 6–7. At Camp Barry and in the defenses of Washington March to July 1864. Dismounted and ordered to Harpers Ferry, West Virginia, July 3 as infantry. Duty in the District of Harpers Ferry, West Virginia, until March 1865.

== Casualties ==
The battery lost a total of 34 men during service; 6 enlisted men killed or mortally wounded, 28 enlisted men died of disease.

== Commanders ==
- Captain John W. Wolcott (1861-1862 - resigned)
- Captain James H. Rigby (1862-1865)
- 1st Lieutenant Thomas Binyon (Oct-Nov 1863 Bristoe Campaign)

=== James H. Rigby ===
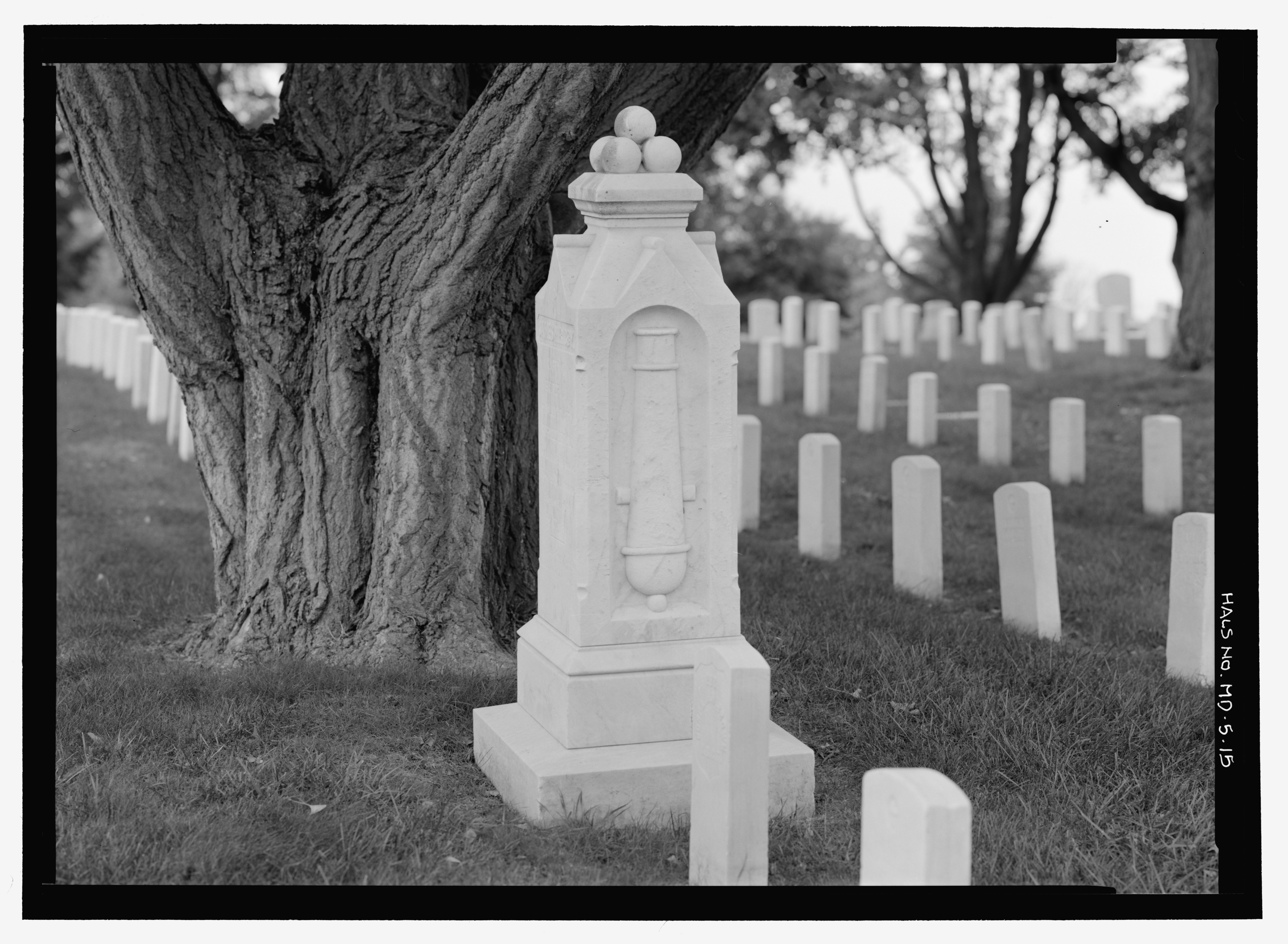
Private headstone for Captain Rigby at Loudon Park National Cemetery

James H. Rigby was born in East Baltimore and worked as a carpenter and builder before the Civil War. Already a lieutenant in the Eagle Artillery Company, he offered his services to the Union at the start of the conflict and recruited an artillery company at the Pikesville arsenal. This unit was mustered into service in September 1861 as part of the Purnell Legion and became known as Battery A, First Maryland Light Artillery. Rigby began his service as the senior first lieutenant. In 1862, he was promoted to captain and became the battery's commander, leading the unit, often called "Rigby's Battery," until the end of the war. Under his command, the battery served in numerous engagements, including the Battle of Gettysburg, where it was positioned on Powers Hill with the twelfth army corps, facing east from the Union line, overlooking McAllister's Mill. After the war, Rigby was appointed a watchman in the custom-house, where he was later promoted to captain of the watch. After being dismissed from that position, he returned to his trade as a carpenter but was forced to stop working due to declining health. Rigby died suddenly of heart disease in 1889 at the age of 57. He was survived by a son and a daughter. In 1891, a special monument with artillery themes including a stack of cannon balls was unveiled at his grave in Loudon Park National Cemetery.

== See also ==
- List of Maryland Civil War units
- Maryland in the Civil War
