= Charles Hammann =

US Navy officer and Medal of Honor recipient

Charles Hazeltine Hammann
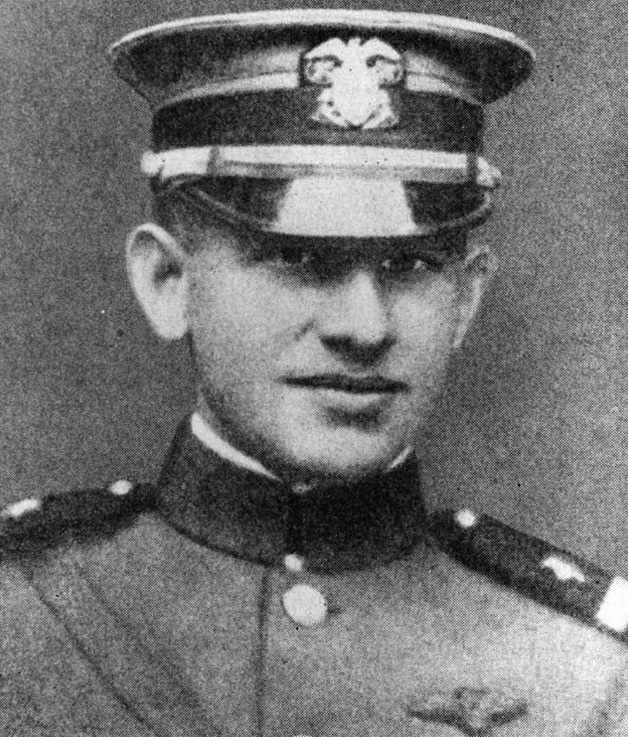
- Ensign Charles Hazeltine Hammann
- Born: March 16, 1892; Baltimore, Maryland
- Died: June 14, 1919 (aged 27); Langley Field, Virginia
- Military career
- Allegiance: United States of America
- Branch: United States Navy
- Service years: 1917–1919
- Rank: Ensign
- Conflicts: World War I
- Awards: Medal of Honor

Charles Hazeltine Hammann (March 16, 1892 – June 14, 1919) was an officer in the United States Navy, an early naval aviator, and a recipient of the Medal of Honor.

== Biography ==
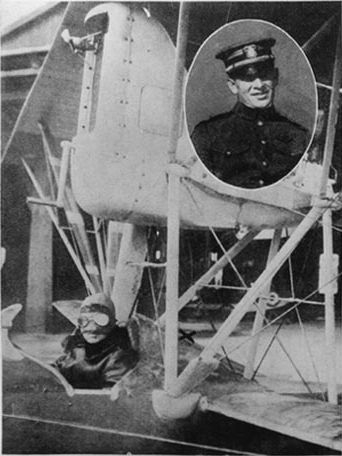
World War I Naval Aviation Heroes: Fliers Whose Exploits Brought Prestige to Naval Aviation: At lower left in his seaplane is Lieutenant G. H. Ludlow, who was rescued, after his plane was disabled by enemy fire, by Ensign C. H. Hammann (inset)

Born in Baltimore, Maryland, Hammann attended Baltimore Polytechnic Institute, and joined the Naval Reserve in October 1917. He was awarded the Medal of Honor, when, as a pilot of a Macchi M.5 seaplane on August 21, 1918, off the Austro-Hungarian coast, he dived down and landed next to a downed fellow pilot, George M. Ludlow, and brought him aboard, and although his plane was not designed for the double load, brought him to safety amid constant danger of attack by Austrian planes. An enlisted pilot at the time, he was commissioned as an ensign in October 1918.

Hammann was killed while on active duty at Langley Field, Virginia, June 14, 1919.

== Namesakes ==
Two ships have been named USS Hammann for him. The first was the USS Hammann (DD-412), a World War II-era Sims-class destroyer in the service of the United States Navy. The second was the USS Hammann (DE-131), an Edsall-class destroyer escort built for the United States Navy during World War II.

== Medal of Honor citation ==
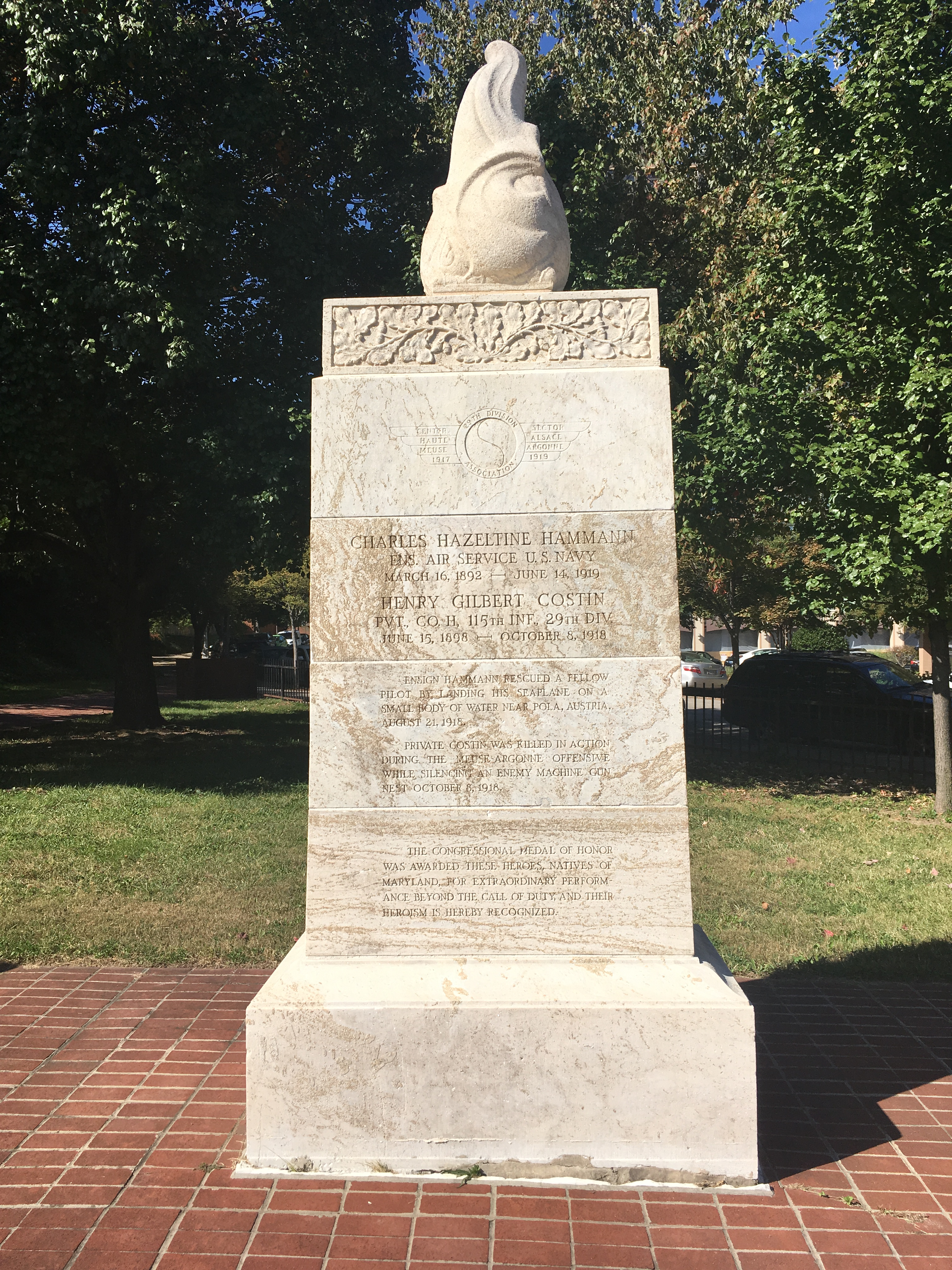
Memorial honoring Medal of Honor recipients Charles Hammann and Henry Gilbert Costin, both of Baltimore, in Congressional Medal of Honor Park, Bolton Hill, Baltimore

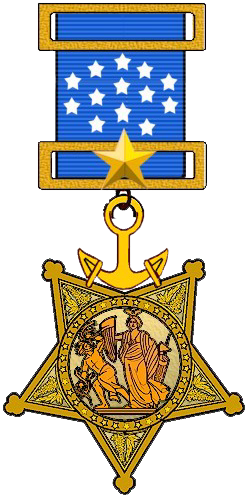

Rank and organization: Ensign, U.S. Naval Reserve Fleet. Born: March 16, 1892, Baltimore, Md. Appointed from: Maryland.

Citation:

For extraordinary heroism as a pilot of a seaplane on 21 August 1918, when with 3 other planes Ens. Hammann took part in a patrol and attacked a superior force of enemy land planes. In the course of the engagement which followed the plane of Ens. George M. Ludlow was shot down and fell in the water 5 miles off Pola. Ens. Hammann immediately dived down and landed on the water close alongside the disabled machine, where he took Ludlow on board. Although his machine was not designed for the double load to which it was subjected, and although there was danger of attack by Austrian planes, he made his way to Porto Corsini.

== See also ==
- List of Medal of Honor recipients
- List of Medal of Honor recipients for World War I
