= SS Henry Gilbert Costin =

Liberty ship of WWII

History

United States
- Name: Henry Gilbert Costin
- Namesake: Henry Gilbert Costin
- Owner: War Shipping Administration (WSA)
- Operator: Cosmopolitan Shipping Co., Inc.
- Ordered: as type (EC2-S-C1) hull, MCE hull 950
- Awarded: 30 January 1942
- Builder: Bethlehem-Fairfield Shipyard, Baltimore, Maryland
- Cost: $1,068,726
- Yard number: 2100
- Way number: 11
- Laid down: 23 January 1943
- Launched: 9 March 1943
- Sponsored by: Mrs. Elizabeth Costin
- Completed: 23 March 1943
- Identification: Call sign: KKNG
- Fate: Laid up in reserve fleet, 18 August 1949, sold, 12 January 1951

United States
- Name: Joseph Feuer
- Owner: Arrow SS Corp. (1951–1952); Contiship Corp. (1952–1954)
- Fate: Sold, September 1954

Liberia
- Name: Evy
- Owner: Bulk Transport
- Operator: Contiship Corp.
- Fate: Sold, 2 January 1959

United States
- Name: Valiant Faith
- Owner: Aphrodite SS Corp. (1958–1959); Lib SS Corp. (1959–1961)
- Operator: Contiship Corp.
- Fate: Sold, 6 October 1961

Greece
- Name: Hermioni
- Owner: Phoenix SS Corp.
- Operator: Mar-Trade Corp.
- Fate: Sold, 1963

India
- Name: Arya Jayanti
- Owner: Jayanti Shipping Co.
- Operator: Bombay & London
- Fate: Scrapped, December 1966

General characteristics
- Class & type: Liberty ship; type EC2-S-C1, standard
- Tonnage: 10,865 LT DWT; 7,176 GRT
- Displacement: 3,380 long tons (3,434 t) (light); 14,245 long tons (14,474 t) (max)
- Length: 441 feet 6 inches (135 m) oa; 416 feet (127 m) pp; 427 feet (130 m) lwl
- Beam: 57 feet (17 m)
- Draft: 27 ft 9.25 in (8.4646 m)
- Installed power: 2 × Oil fired 450 °F (232 °C) boilers, operating at 220 psi (1,500 kPa); 2,500 hp (1,900 kW)
- Propulsion: 1 × triple-expansion steam engine, (manufactured by Worthington Pump & Machinery Corp, Harrison, New Jersey); 1 × screw propeller
- Speed: 11.5 knots (21.3 km/h; 13.2 mph)
- Capacity: 562,608 cubic feet (15,931 m^{3}) (grain); 499,573 cubic feet (14,146 m^{3}) (bale)
- Complement: 38–62 USMM; 21–40 USNAG
- Armament: Varied by ship; Bow-mounted 3-inch (76 mm)/50-caliber gun; Stern-mounted 4-inch (102 mm)/50-caliber gun; 2–8 × single 20-millimeter (0.79 in) Oerlikon anti-aircraft (AA) cannons and/or, 2–8 × 37-millimeter (1.46 in) M1 AA guns

SS Henry Gilbert Costin was a Liberty ship built in the United States during World War II. She was named after Henry Gilbert Costin, a private in the United States Army who received the Medal of Honor for his actions in World War I, near Bois–de–Consenvoye, France, during the Meuse–Argonne offensive.

== Construction ==
Henry Gilbert Costin was laid down on 23 January 1943, under a Maritime Commission (MARCOM) contract, MCE hull 950, by the Bethlehem-Fairfield Shipyard, Baltimore, Maryland; she was sponsored by Mrs. Elizabeth Costin, the mother of Henry Costin, and launched on 9 March 1943.

== History ==
She was allocated to the Cosmopolitan Shipping Co., Inc., on 23 March 1943.

On 18 September 1949, she was laid up in the Beaumont Reserve Fleet, in Beaumont, Texas. On 12 January 1951, she was sold to Arrow SS Corp., and renamed Joseph Feuer. She was sold on 2 January 1959, reflagged in Liberia, and renamed Evy. In 1960, she was again flagged in the US and renamed Valliant Faith. On 6 October 1961, she was reflagged in Greece, and renamed Hermioni and then Arya Jayanti in 1963. She was scrapped in Bombay, India, in December 1966.

== Bibliography ==
- "Bethlehem-Fairfield, Baltimore MD". www.ShipbuildingHistory.com. 7 August 2021.
- Maritime Administration. "Henry Gilbert Costin". Ship History Database Vessel Status Card. U.S. Department of Transportation, Maritime Administration.
- Davies, James (May 2004). "Specifications (As-Built)" (PDF). p. 23.
- "SS Henry Gilbert Costin".
- Sawyer, L.A.; Mitchell, W.H. (1985). The Liberty Ships. Bury St. Edmunds, Suffolk, Great Britain: St. Edmundsbury Press Ltd. ISBN 1850440492.
