= USS Hammann (DE-131) =

1942 Edsall-class destroyer escort

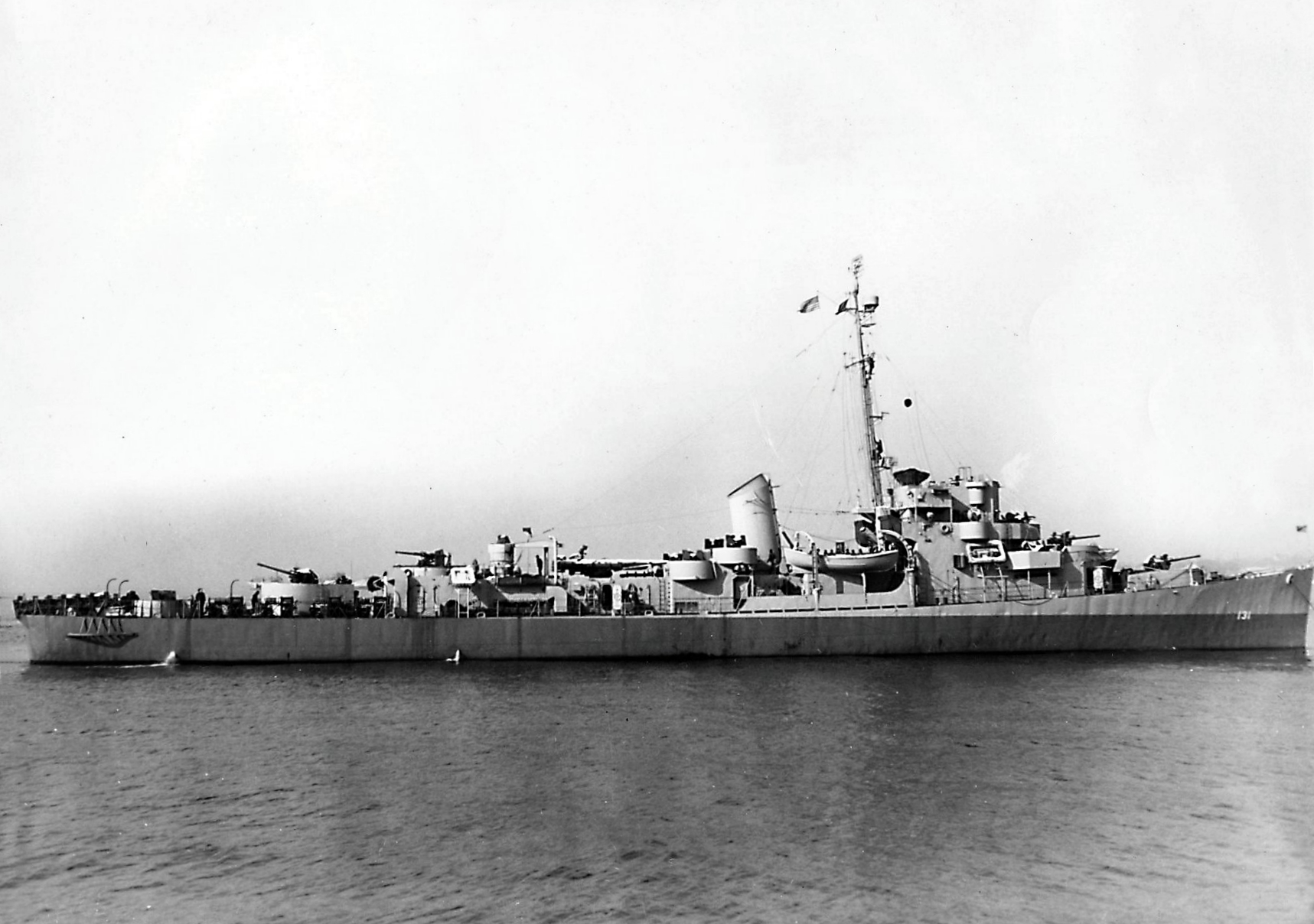
- USS Hammann (DE-131) on 21 March 1944

History

United States
- Namesake: Charles Hazeltine Hammann
- Builder: Consolidated Steel Corporation, Orange, Texas
- Laid down: 10 July 1942 as Langley
- Launched: 13 December 1942 as Hammann
- Commissioned: 17 May 1943
- Decommissioned: 24 October 1945
- Stricken: 1 October 1972
- Fate: Sold 18 January 1974, scrapped

General characteristics
- Class & type: Edsall-class destroyer escort
- Displacement: 1,253 tons standard; 1,590 tons full load
- Length: 306 feet (93.27 m)
- Beam: 36.58 feet (11.15 m)
- Draft: 10.42 full load feet (3.18 m)
- Propulsion: 4 FM diesel engines, 4 diesel-generators, 6,000 shp (4.5 MW), 2 screws
- Speed: 21 knots (39 km/h)
- Range: 9,100 nmi. at 12 knots; (17,000 km at 22 km/h)
- Complement: 8 officers, 201 enlisted
- Armament: 3 × single 3 in (76 mm)/50 guns; 1 × twin 40 mm AA guns; 8 × single 20 mm AA guns; 1 × triple 21 in (533 mm) torpedo tubes; 8 × depth charge projectors; 1 × depth charge projector (hedgehog); 2 × depth charge tracks

USS Hammann (DE-131) was an Edsall-class destroyer escort built for the U.S. Navy during World War II. She served in the Atlantic Ocean and provided destroyer escort protection against submarine and air attack for Navy vessels and convoys.

She was named after Charles Hazeltine Hammann who was awarded the Medal of Honor, when, as a pilot of a seaplane 21 August 1918, off the coast of Italy, he dived down and landed next to a downed fellow pilot, brought him aboard, and although his plane was not designed for the double load, brought him to safety amid constant danger of attack by Austrian planes.

Hammann was laid down 10 July 1942 as Langley, renamed Hammann 1 August 1942, launched by Consolidated Steel Corporation, Orange, Texas, 13 December 1942; sponsored by Mrs. Lilliam Rhode, sister of Charles Hammann; and commissioned 17 May 1943.

== World War II North Atlantic operations ==
Hammann departed 5 June for Bermuda and shakedown operations, returning to Philadelphia, Pennsylvania, 6 July. From there the ship sailed to Norfolk, Virginia, and on 13 July began the first of her many transatlantic convoy voyages. Her first four passages to Casablanca, Morocco, covered the period 13 July 1943 to 10 March 1944. During this period she screened convoys in company with escort carriers. She made several attacks on submarine contacts, but recorded no kills.

== Rescuing survivors in the water ==
Between 28 March 1944 and 29 November 1944 the busy ship made no less than six more voyages successfully convoying to and from Europe, stopping at ports in Northern Ireland. Starting 4 January the ship changed her convoy destination to Liverpool and made four more voyages protecting the vital flow of supplies for the end of the European war. During one passage, 2 March 1945, Hammann was called upon to aid one of the ships in the convoy, SS Lone Jack, after a torpedo attack. The destroyer escort picked up 70 survivors and sent salvage parties aboard the stricken ship to keep her afloat.

== End-of-war activity ==
Her duties in the Atlantic completed, Hammann departed New York 7 July 1945 for training operations in the Guantanamo Bay, Cuba, area, departing 24 July for California. She arrived San Diego, California, via the Panama Canal 4 August, and from there proceeded to Pearl Harbor. As the Pacific war was then over, the destroyer escort took on passengers at Pearl Harbor for California, and after discharging them sailed through the Canal again to Charleston, South Carolina, arriving 25 September.

== Post-war decommissioning ==
She decommissioned at Green Cove Springs, Florida, 24 October 1945, and was placed in reserve. She was later moved to the Texas Group at Orange, Texas, where she remained out of commission in reserve until she was stricken 1 October 1972, sold 18 January 1974, and scrapped.

== Philadelphia Experiment ==
The "Philadelphia Experiment" was a purported naval military experiment at the Philadelphia Naval Shipyard in Philadelphia, Pennsylvania, sometime around 28 October 1943, in which the ship USS Eldridge was to be rendered invisible (i.e. by a cloaking device) to human observers for a brief period. Since the Eldridge was not in the shipyard at the time of the experiment, some have suggested that the experiment took place with the Hammann rather than the Eldridge.
