= List of Lepidoptera of Arizona =

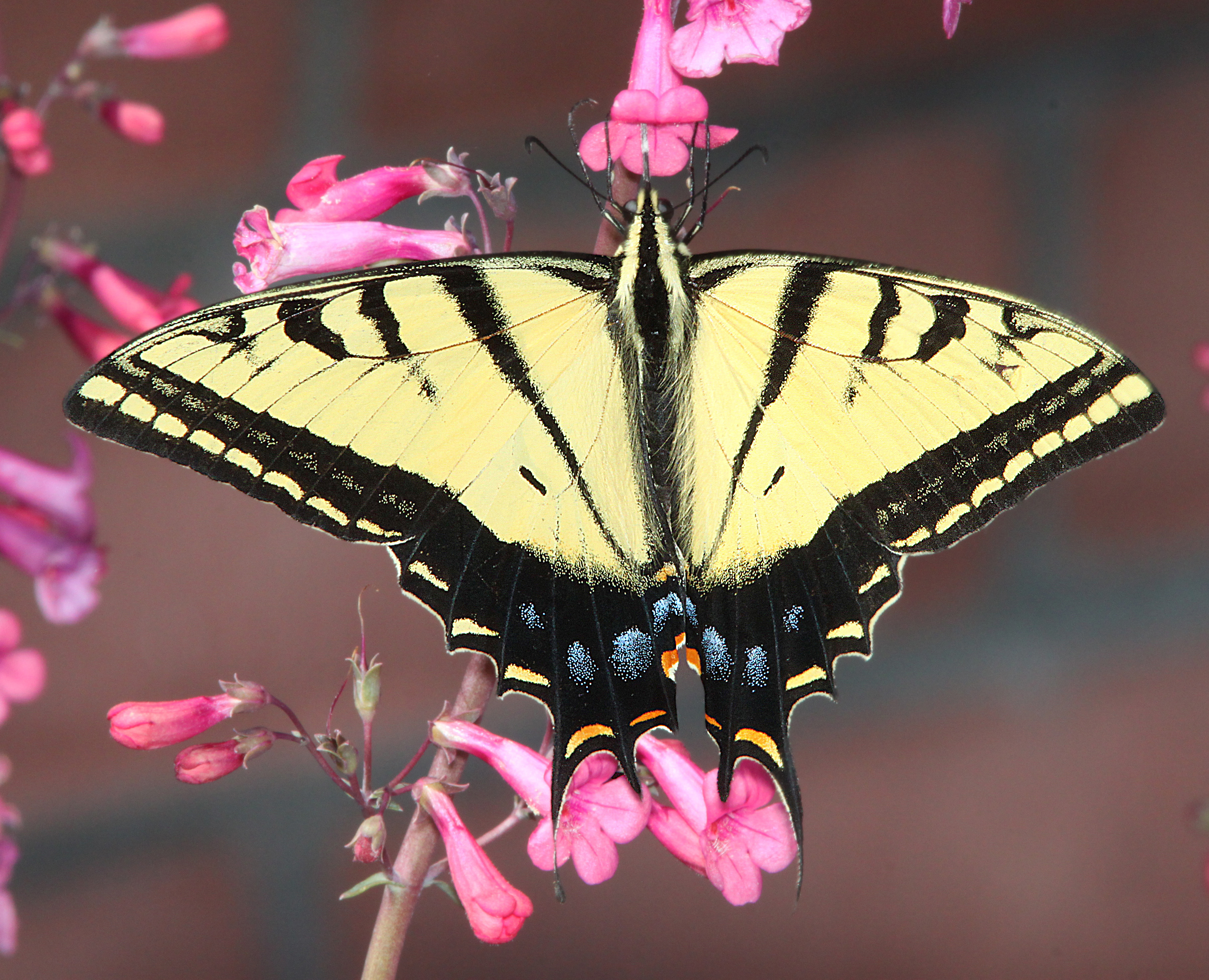
The two-tailed swallowtail (Papilio multicaudata) is the official state butterfly of Arizona.

This is a list of butterflies and moths—species of the order Lepidoptera—that have been observed in the U.S. state of Arizona.

== Butterflies and moths ==
A partial list of the butterflies and moths that can be found within the borders of the State of Arizona is:

- Achalarus toxeus (strays from south), coyote cloudywing, coyote skipper
- Agathymus aryxna, Arizona giant skipper
- Agraulis vanillae Gulf fritillary
- Asterocampa leilia, emperess Leilia (brushfoot)
- Atlides halesus, giant purple hairstreak
- Autochton cellus, golden banded skipper
- Battus philenor, pipevine swallowtail
- Callophrys xami, xami hairstreak
- Callophrys eryphon, western pine elfin
- Calpodes ethlius
- Celotes nessus
- Cercyonis pegala, common wood-nymph
- Charadra tapa
- Chiomara asychis (strays from south), white-patched skipper
- Colias cesonia, southern dogface
- Colias eurytheme, alfalfa sulfur
- Copaeodes aurantiacus, orange skipperling
- Cucullia lilacina
- Danaus gilippus, queen
- Danaus plexippus, monarch
- Eacles oslari
- Echinargus isola, Reakirt's blue (hairstreak)
- Erynnis funeralis, funereal duskywing (skipper)
- Erora quadema, Arizona hairstreak
- Euptoieta claudia, variegated fritillary
- Eurema nicippe, sleepy orange sulfur
- Eurema mexicanum, Mexican yellow
- Hemiargus ceraunus, Ceraunus blue (hairstreak)
- Heliopetes macaira, Turk's-cap skipper
- Hyles lineata, white-lined sphinx moth
- Hypaurotis crysalus, Colorado hairstreak
- Hylephila phyleus, fiery skipper
- Junonia coenia, buckeye
- Lerodea eufala, Eufala skipper
- Leptotes marina, marine blue (hairstreak)
- Libtheana carinenta, snout
- Lithophane leeae
- Manduca quinquemaculata, tomato worm
- Megathymus yuccae
- Ministrymon leda, Leda hairstreak
- Nymphalis antiopa, mourning cloak
- Nathalis iole, dainty sulfur
- Panthea judyae
- Papilio cresphontes, giant swallowtail
- Papilio polyxenes, black swallowtail
- Phoebis sennae, cloudless sulfur
- Phoebis agarithe, large orange sulfur
- Phyciodes phaon, Phaon crescent
- Panoquina ocola (strays from south in SE-(Madrean Sky Islands)), ocola skipper
- Pyrgus albescens, white checkered skipper
- Pyrgus ruralis, desert checkered skipper, two-banded checkered skipper
- Pyrrhopyge araxes, golf-club skipper
- Pyrgus albescens, white checkered skipper
- Renia mortualis
- Renia subterminalis
- Schinia immaculata
- Strymon melinus, gray hairstreak
- Sympistis cleopatra
- Tegeticula yuccasella
- Tetanolita negalis
- Tricholita ferrisi
- Vanessa cardui, painted lady
- Vanessa virginiensis, American lady

== Lepidoptera of the Atascosa Mountains region ==
- Eacles oslari

== Lepidoptera of the Chiricahua Mountains region ==
- Charadra tapa
- Lithophane leeae
- Tricholita ferrisi

== Lepidoptera of the Grand Canyon region ==
- Cucullia lilacina
- Schinia immaculata
- Sympistis cleopatra

== Lepidoptera of the Huachuca Mountains region ==
- Charadra tapa
- Eacles oslari
- Panthea judyae
- Renia mortualis
- Renia subterminalis
- Tetanolita negalis
- Tricholita ferrisi

== Lepidoptera of the Patagonia Mountains region ==
- Eacles oslari

== Lepidoptera of the Santa Catalina Mountains region ==
- Idia parvulalis–(type locale)

== Lepidoptera of the Santa Rita Mountains region ==
- Charadra tapa
- Eacles oslari
