= Forbes' renia =

Scientific classification
- Kingdom: Animalia
- Phylum: Arthropoda
- Class: Insecta
- Order: Lepidoptera
- Superfamily: Noctuoidea
- Family: Erebidae
- Subfamily: Herminiinae
- Genus: Renia
- Species: R. n. sp. nr. discoloralis

Binomial name
- Renia n. sp. nr. discoloralis

Species of moth

Forbes' renia (also known as Renia n. sp. nr. discoloralis, since it has not been formally described yet) is a moth of the family Noctuidae. It is found in the United States from the Delaware Bay region of New Jersey, southward into Gulf states.

There are two generations per year in most of its range.

The larvae feed on organic matter, including dead leaves.
