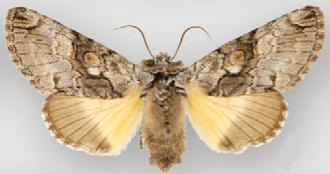
- Female
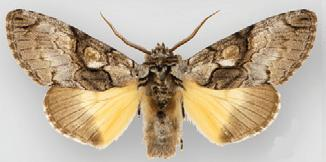
- Male

Scientific classification
- Domain: Eukaryota
- Kingdom: Animalia
- Phylum: Arthropoda
- Class: Insecta
- Order: Lepidoptera
- Superfamily: Noctuoidea
- Family: Noctuidae
- Genus: Charadra
- Species: C. tapa

Binomial name
- Charadra tapa Schmidt & Anweiler, 2010

= Charadra tapa =

Species of moth

Charadra tapa is a moth of the family Noctuidae. It is found in the Chiricahua, Huachuca, and Santa Rita Mountains of south-eastern Arizona, although the species probably occurs in adjacent parts of Mexico.

The length of the forewings is 18 mm (0.71 in) for males and 19 mm (0.75 in) for females. The main flight period is from September to October; a single specimen from early May indicates there may be spring flight.

Larvae have been reared on Quercus gambelii.

== Etymology ==
The name tapa is an anagram of pata.
