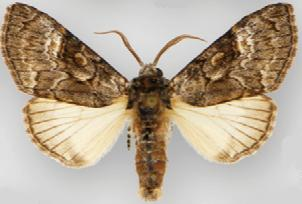
- Male
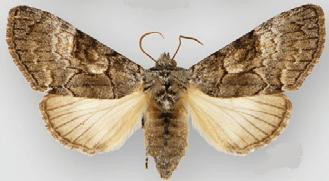
- Female

Scientific classification
- Domain: Eukaryota
- Kingdom: Animalia
- Phylum: Arthropoda
- Class: Insecta
- Order: Lepidoptera
- Superfamily: Noctuoidea
- Family: Noctuidae
- Genus: Charadra
- Species: C. moneta

Binomial name
- Charadra moneta Schmidt & Anweiler, 2010

= Charadra moneta =

Species of moth

Charadra moneta is a moth of the family Noctuidae. It is found from central and eastern Arizona (Coconino and Apache Cos.), the San Mateo Mountains of New Mexico, the Guadalupe Mountains of New Mexico and Texas, and the Big Bend region of Texas; south to the Sierra Madre in Nuevo León, northern Mexico.

The length of the forewings is 18 mm for males and 19 mm for females. Adults are on wing from March to June (Arizona, Texas, and New Mexico) and September (Mexico), possibly indicating two or more broods.

Larvae have been reared on Quercus gambelii.

== Etymology ==
During a discussion regarding the distinctness of this taxon compared to Charadra deridens, Schmidt bet Anweiler ten dollars that the DNA barcodes of C. moneta and C. deridens would be more than 1% divergent. Moneta is the Latin term for money.
