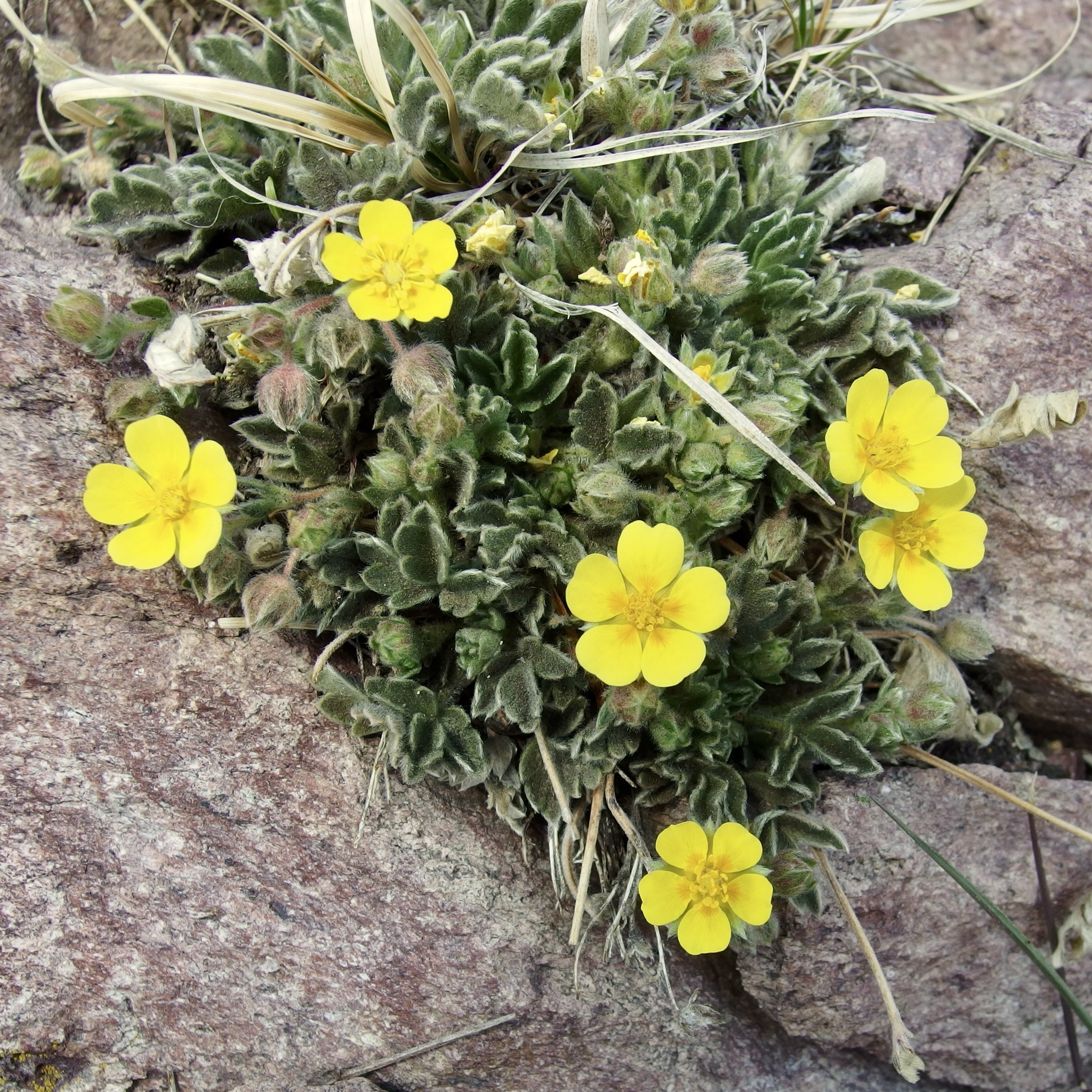

Conservation status
- Imperiled (NatureServe)

Scientific classification
- Kingdom: Plantae
- Clade: Embryophytes
- Clade: Tracheophytes
- Clade: Spermatophytes
- Clade: Angiosperms
- Clade: Eudicots
- Clade: Rosids
- Order: Rosales
- Family: Rosaceae
- Genus: Potentilla
- Species: P. rhyolitica

Binomial name
- Potentilla rhyolitica Ertter

= Potentilla rhyolitica =

Species of plant

Potentilla rhyolitica is a species of flowering plant in the rose family, Rosaceae. Its two varieties, P. rhyolitica var. rhyolitica and P. rhyolitica var. chiricahuensis, are known by the common names Huachuca cinquefoil and Chiricahua cinquefoil, respectively. Both varieties are endemic to southern Arizona, where they grow at high elevations in the Madrean Sky Islands. In part because of its limited distribution, P. rhyolitica is considered an imperiled species, and P. rhyolitica var. chiricahuensis is critically imperiled.

== Description ==
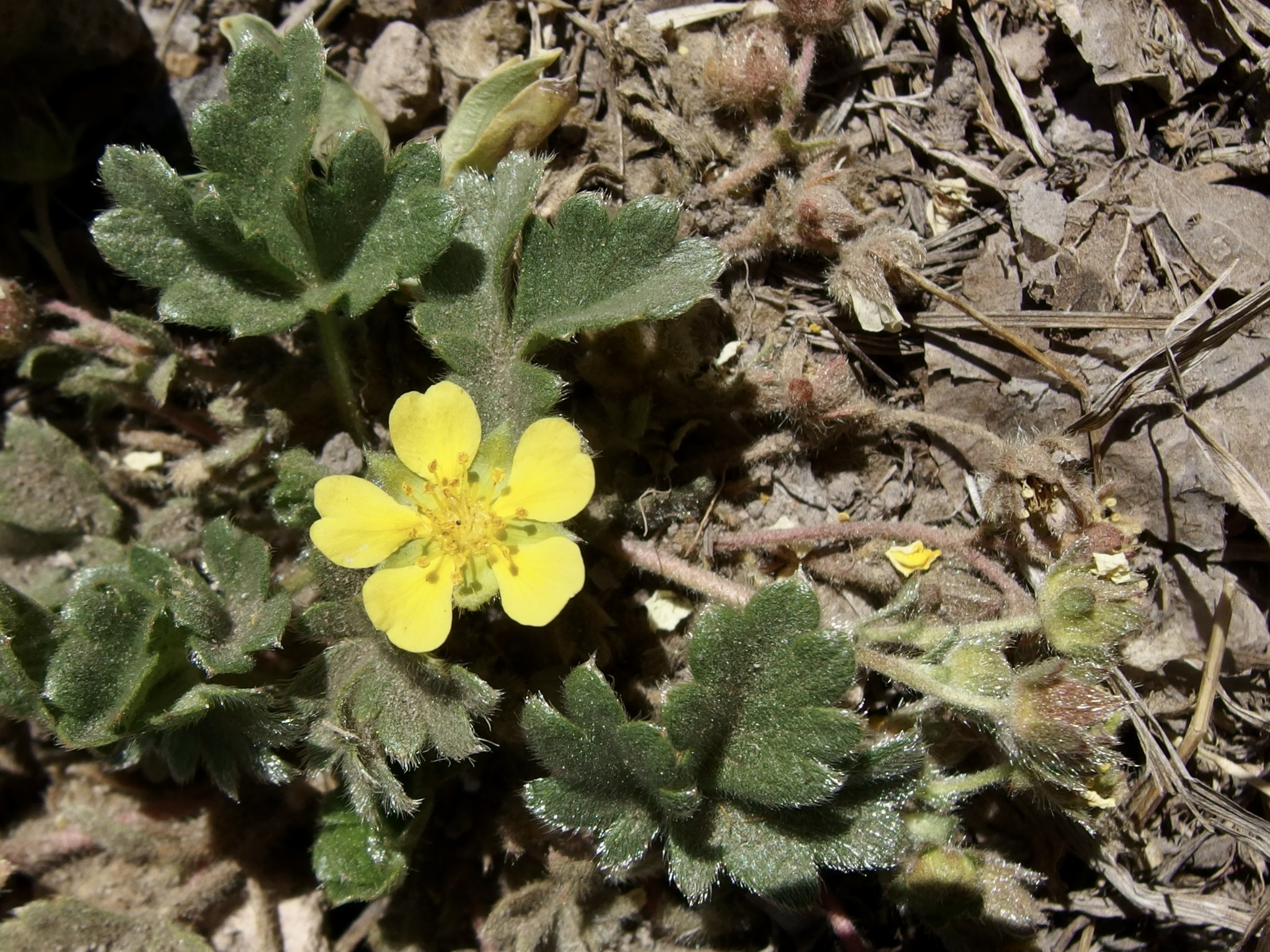
Potentilla rhyolitica var. chiricahuensis has greener leaves than the nominate variety, usually without densely silky hairs.

Potentilla rhyolitica plants grow in tufts or rosettes. The stems are 2–20 cm long, prostrate, and covered in fine hairs and gland-tipped trichomes. The basal leaves are 2–8 cm long, green (in var. chiricahuensis) or gray-green (in var. rhyolitica), and borne on petioles 1–6 cm long. The leaf consists of three (or rarely five) leaflets, often held on their own short stalks, which are 1–3 cm long and 0.8–1.8 cm wide. Each leaflet has several teeth and is covered on both sides in hairs of varying lengths and glandular trichomes. While the hairs on P. rhyolitica var. rhyolitica are dense and silky, the hairs on P. rhyolitica var. chiricahuensis tend to be longer, coarser, and less dense.

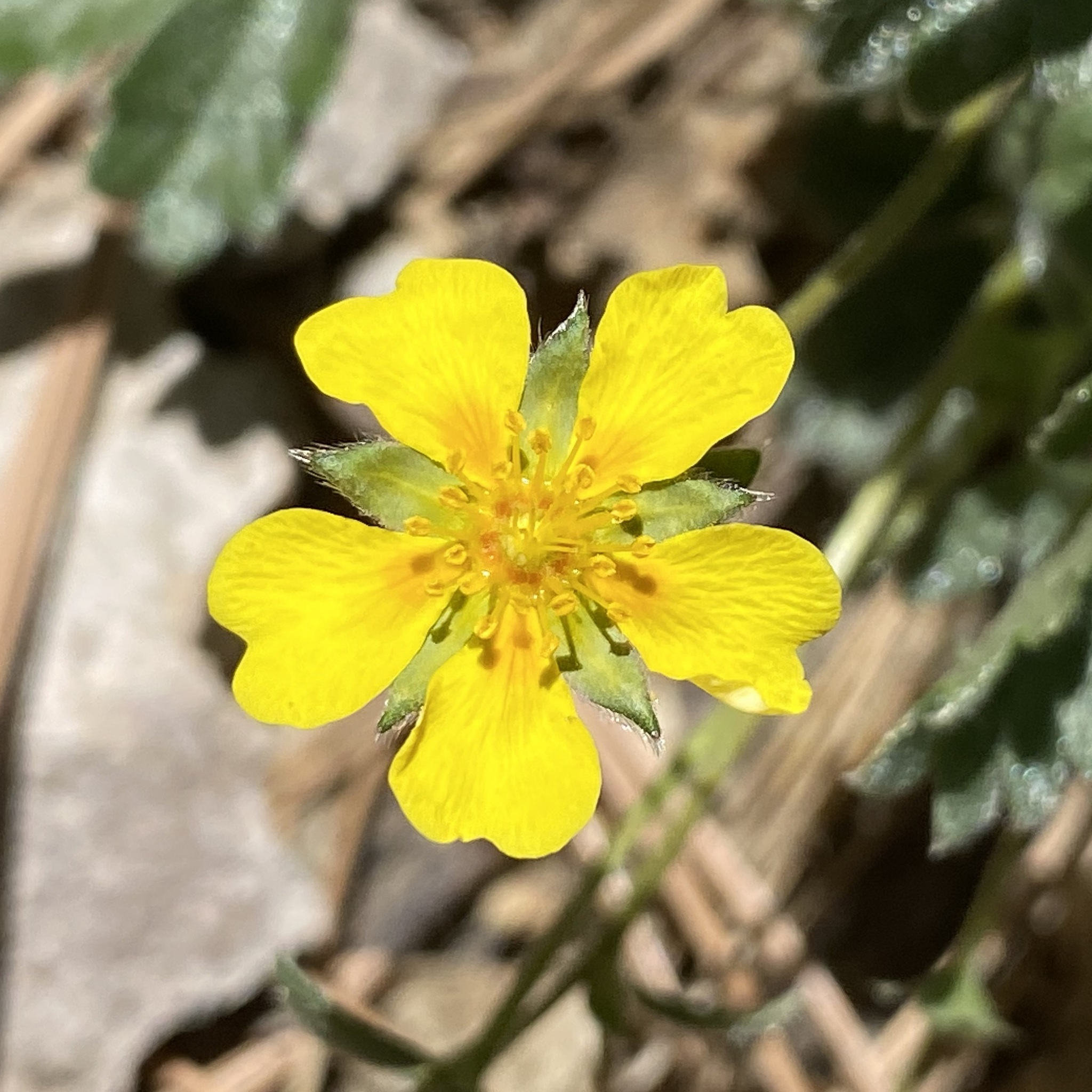
An open flower blooming in the Santa Rita Mountains shows the five heart-shaped petals and five acute-tipped sepals typical of Potentilla rhyolitica.

Flowering occurs in spring, from April to June in var. rhyolitica and from May to June in var. chiricahuensis. The inflorescences bear 1–10 flowers, each held on a pedicel 0.5–1 cm long. The flowers are held in a cup-like structure known as a hypanthium, which is 3–5 mm wide and subtended by elliptical bracts, 2–4 mm long. Like other members of Potentilla section Subviscosae, the flowers of P. rhyolitica are 5-merous, meaning that they have five sepals and five petals. The sepals, held directly below the petals, are 3–5 mm long with acute tips. Each petal is bright yellow (with a paler yellow underside), heart-shaped, 3–7 mm long, and 2–5 mm wide. Flowers have 15–20 stamens and 5–15 styles. The fruit, called achenes, each hold a single seed and are brown, smooth or ribbed, and 1.5–2.2 mm long.

== Distribution ==
Both varieties of Potentilla rhyolitica are endemic to the Madrean Sky Islands in Arizona. The isolation of high-elevation Potentilla populations by surrounding dry lowlands has contributed to evolutionary radiation, giving rise to several closely related species in the southwestern United States and Mexico, many with narrow distributional ranges.

The nominate variety, P. rhyolitica var. rhyolitica, is found in the Huachuca Mountains of Cochise County and the Santa Rita Mountains in Santa Cruz County. It grows on rocky outcrops composed of rhyolite and quartizite in open pine forests at elevations of 2600–2900 m. There are five known sites where P. rhyolitica var. rhyolitica occurs, all along trails to mountain summits. Impacts from hikers, including trampling and the introduction of non-native species, are potential threats to conservation of the variety.

Further east, P. rhyolitica var. chiricahuensis is found in the Chiricahua Mountains of Cochise County, Arizona. It grows in rocky flats in mixed conifer forests at elevations of 2700–2900 m. Few populations of this variety are known, all of which are within the Chiricahua Wilderness Area. While threats to these populations are not well understood, they likely include climate change, habitat fragmentation, invasive species, grazing by cattle, and wildfire suppression. Because of its limited distribution and these threats, P. rhyolitica var. chiricahuensis is considered a critically imperiled variety.

== Taxonomy ==
Barbara Ertter collected the type specimen of Potentilla rhyolitica near Carr Peak in the Huachuca Mountains in June, 1993. She also collected the type specimen of P. rhyolitica var. chiricahuensis the day prior, near Flys Peak in the Chiricahua Mountains. Ertter formally described P. rhyolitica and its two varieties in 2007, also suggesting the common names Huachuca cinquefoil (for var. rhyolitica) and Chiricahua cinquefoil (for var. chiricahuensis), referring to the mountain ranges where each variety grows. Ertter placed P. rhyolitica in the taxonomic section Subviscosae, a group of species distributed across the sky islands of the southwestern United States and Mexico.

The botanist John J. Thornber recognized both varieties of P. rhyolitica as being taxonomically distinct in the early 1900s, using the names P. trifoliolata and P. pinetorum for P. rhyolitica var. rhyolitica and the name P. substrigosa for P. rhyolitica var. chiricahuensis in herbarium annotations. However, Thornber never published any of these names.
