= Eupithecia huachuca =

Scientific classification
- Domain: Eukaryota
- Kingdom: Animalia
- Phylum: Arthropoda
- Class: Insecta
- Order: Lepidoptera
- Family: Geometridae
- Genus: Eupithecia
- Species: E. huachuca

Binomial name
- Eupithecia huachuca Grossbeck, 1908

Species of moth

Eupithecia huachuca is a moth in the family Geometridae. It is found in Arizona (including the Huachuca Mountains and Chiricahua Mountains) and Texas.
