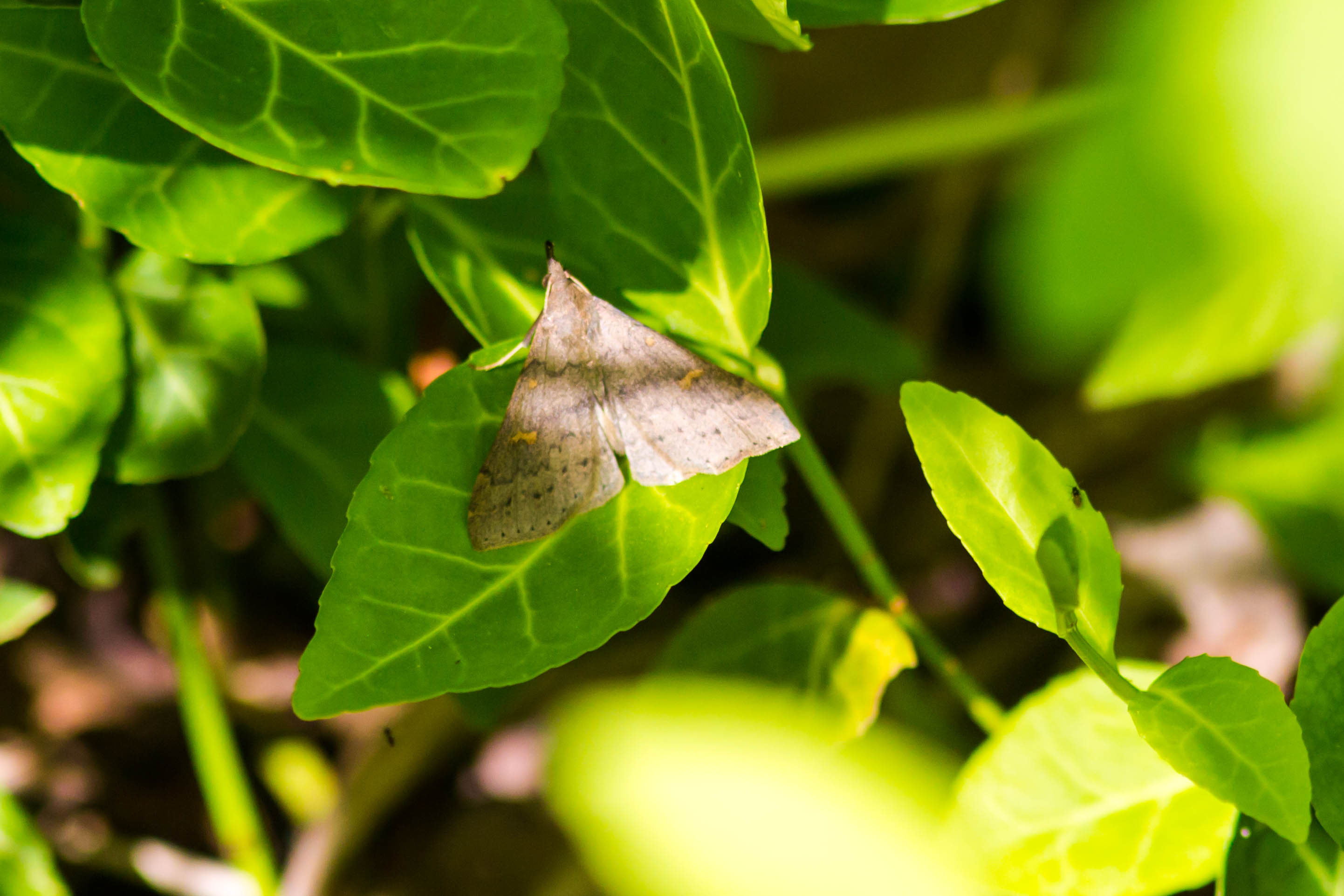

Scientific classification
- Kingdom: Animalia
- Phylum: Arthropoda
- Class: Insecta
- Order: Lepidoptera
- Superfamily: Noctuoidea
- Family: Erebidae
- Genus: Renia
- Species: R. salusalis

Binomial name
- Renia salusalis (Linnaeus, 1758)

Synonyms
- Renia brevirostralis Grote, 1872

= Renia salusalis =

Species of moth

Renia salusalis, the dotted renia, is a litter moth of the family Erebidae. The species was first described by Carl Linnaeus in his 1758 10th edition of Systema Naturae. It is found in the United States from Colorado, Ohio and Connecticut, south to Florida and Texas.

The wingspan is about 27 mm. Adults are on wing from May to September in the north. There is at least a partial second generation in New Jersey. There are multiple generations in Missouri.

The larvae feed on detritus, including dead leaves.
