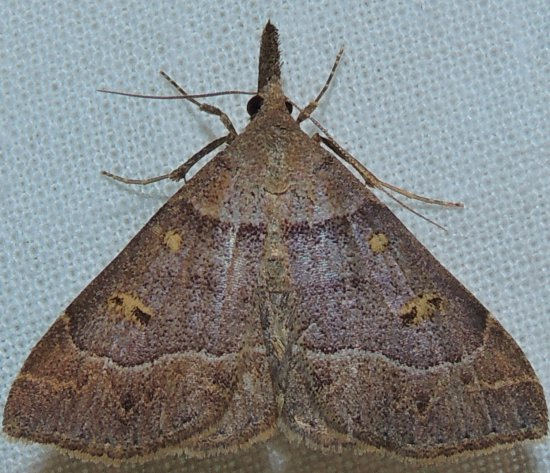

Scientific classification
- Domain: Eukaryota
- Kingdom: Animalia
- Phylum: Arthropoda
- Class: Insecta
- Order: Lepidoptera
- Superfamily: Noctuoidea
- Family: Erebidae
- Genus: Renia
- Species: R. flavipunctalis

Binomial name
- Renia flavipunctalis (Geyer, 1832)

Synonyms
- Renia phalerosalis (Walker, 1859); Renia heliusalis (Walker, 1859); Renia pastorialis Grote, 1872; Renia belfragei Grote, 1872; Renia exerta J. B. Smith, 1909; Renia atrimacula J. B. Smith, 1910 (form)

= Renia flavipunctalis =

Species of moth

Renia flavipunctalis, the yellow-dotted renia, yellow-spotted renia or even-lined renia, is a litter moth of the family Erebidae. The species was first described by Carl Geyer in 1832. It is found from southern Canada (from Nova Scotia west to Alberta) to Florida and Texas.

The wingspan is 26–31 mm. Adults are on wing from June to August. There is one generation in the north-east.

The larvae feed on organic matter, including dead leaves of deciduous trees.
