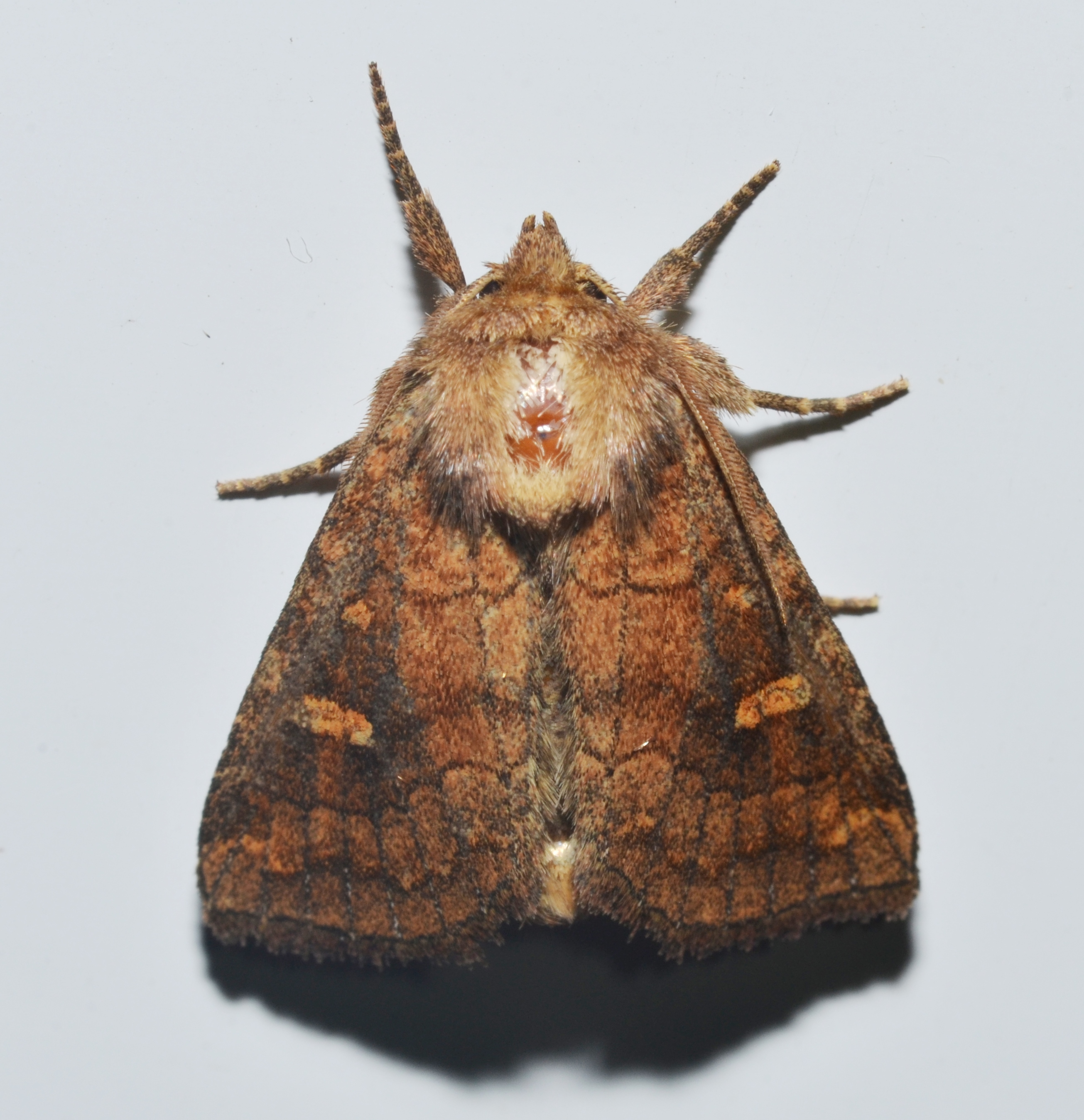

Scientific classification
- Kingdom: Animalia
- Phylum: Arthropoda
- Clade: Pancrustacea
- Class: Insecta
- Order: Lepidoptera
- Superfamily: Noctuoidea
- Family: Noctuidae
- Genus: Tricholita
- Species: T. signata

Binomial name
- Tricholita signata Walker, 1860

= Tricholita signata =

Species of moth

Tricholita signata, the signate Quaker, is a moth in the family Noctuidae described by Francis Walker in 1860. It is found in North America.

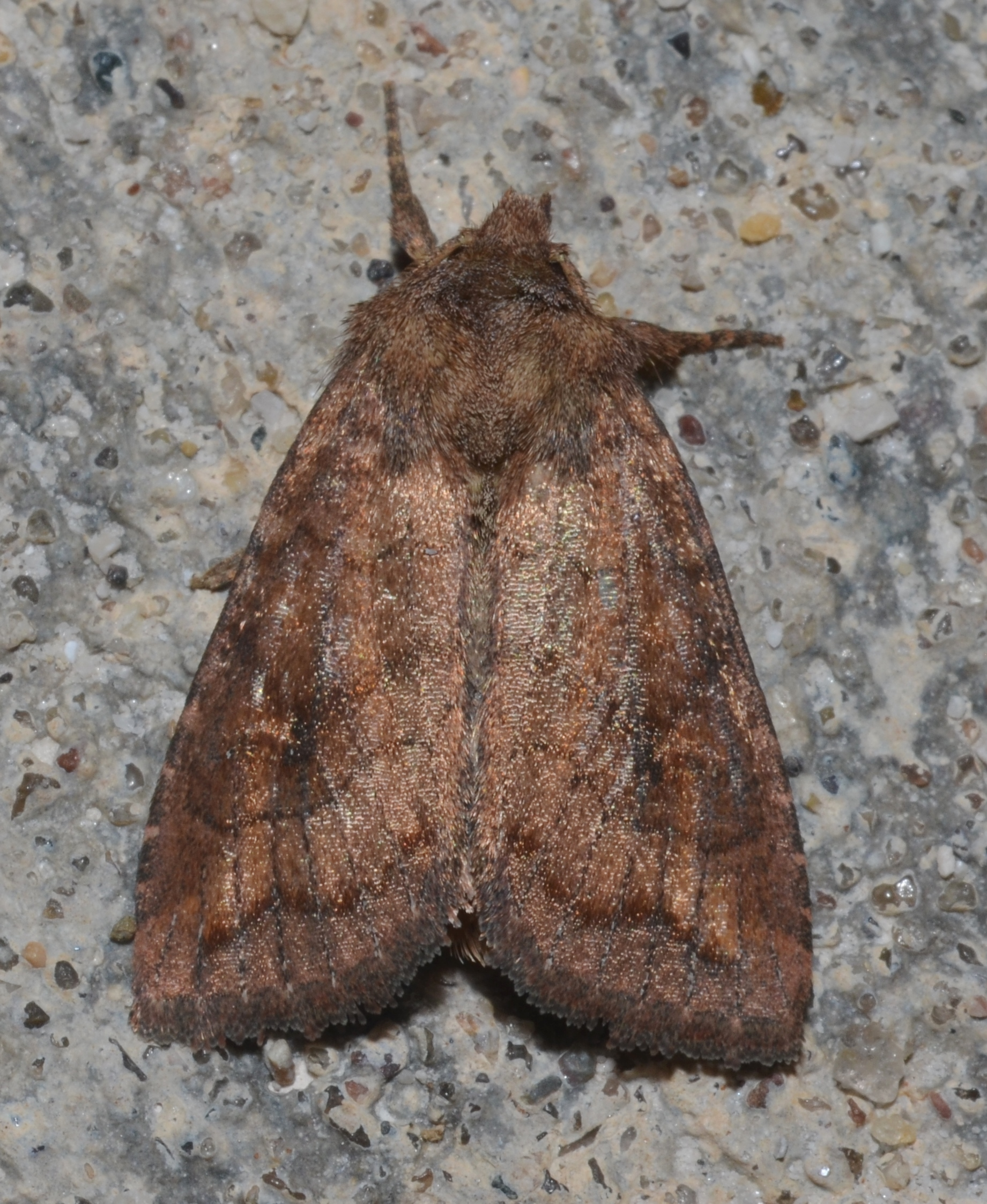
