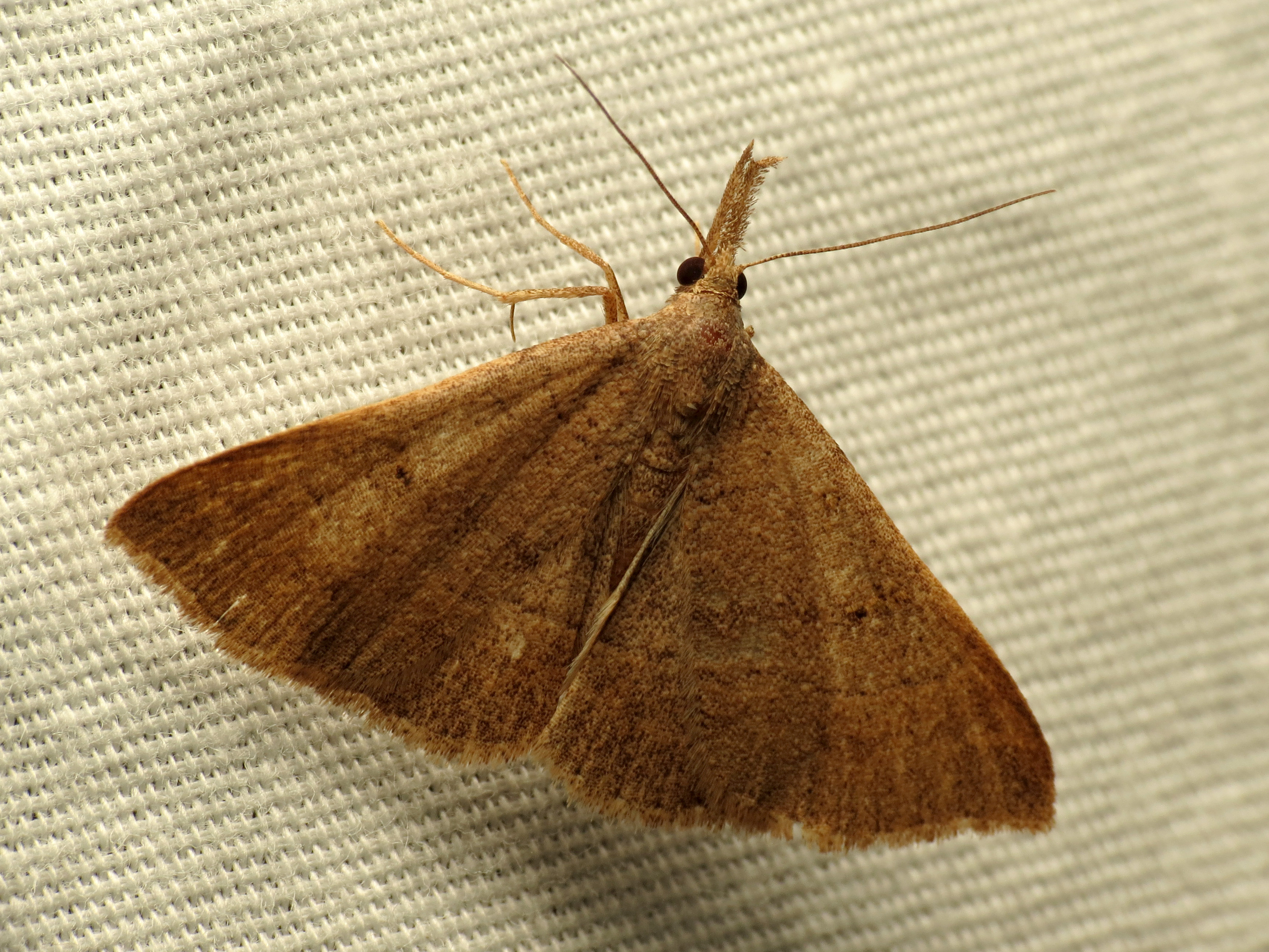
- Renia hutsoni

Scientific classification
- Kingdom: Animalia
- Phylum: Arthropoda
- Class: Insecta
- Order: Lepidoptera
- Superfamily: Noctuoidea
- Family: Erebidae
- Subfamily: Herminiinae
- Genus: Renia; Guenée in Boisduval & Guenée, 1854

Synonyms
- Gisira Walker, [1859]; Crymona Walker, 1862

= Renia =

Genus of moths

Renia is a genus of litter moths of the family Erebidae erected by Achille Guenée in 1854.

== Species ==
- Renia adspergillus Bosc, 1800 – speckled renia moth
- Renia discoloralis Guenée, 1854 – discolored renia moth
- Renia factiosalis Walker, 1859 – sociable renia moth
- Renia flavipunctalis Geyer, 1832 – yellow-spotted renia moth
- Renia fraternalis J.B. Smith, 1895 – fraternal renia moth
- Renia hutsoni J.B. Smith, 1906
- Renia mortualis Barnes & McDunnough, 1912
- Renia nemoralis Barnes & McDunnough, 1918 – chocolate renia moth
- Renia pulverosalis J.B. Smith, 1895
- Renia rigida J.B. Smith, 1905
- Renia salusalis Walker, 1859
- Renia sobrialis Walker, 1859 – sober renia moth
- Renia subterminalis Barnes & McDunnough, 1912

== Unpublished species ==
- Renia n. sp. nr. discoloralis – Forbes' renia moth
