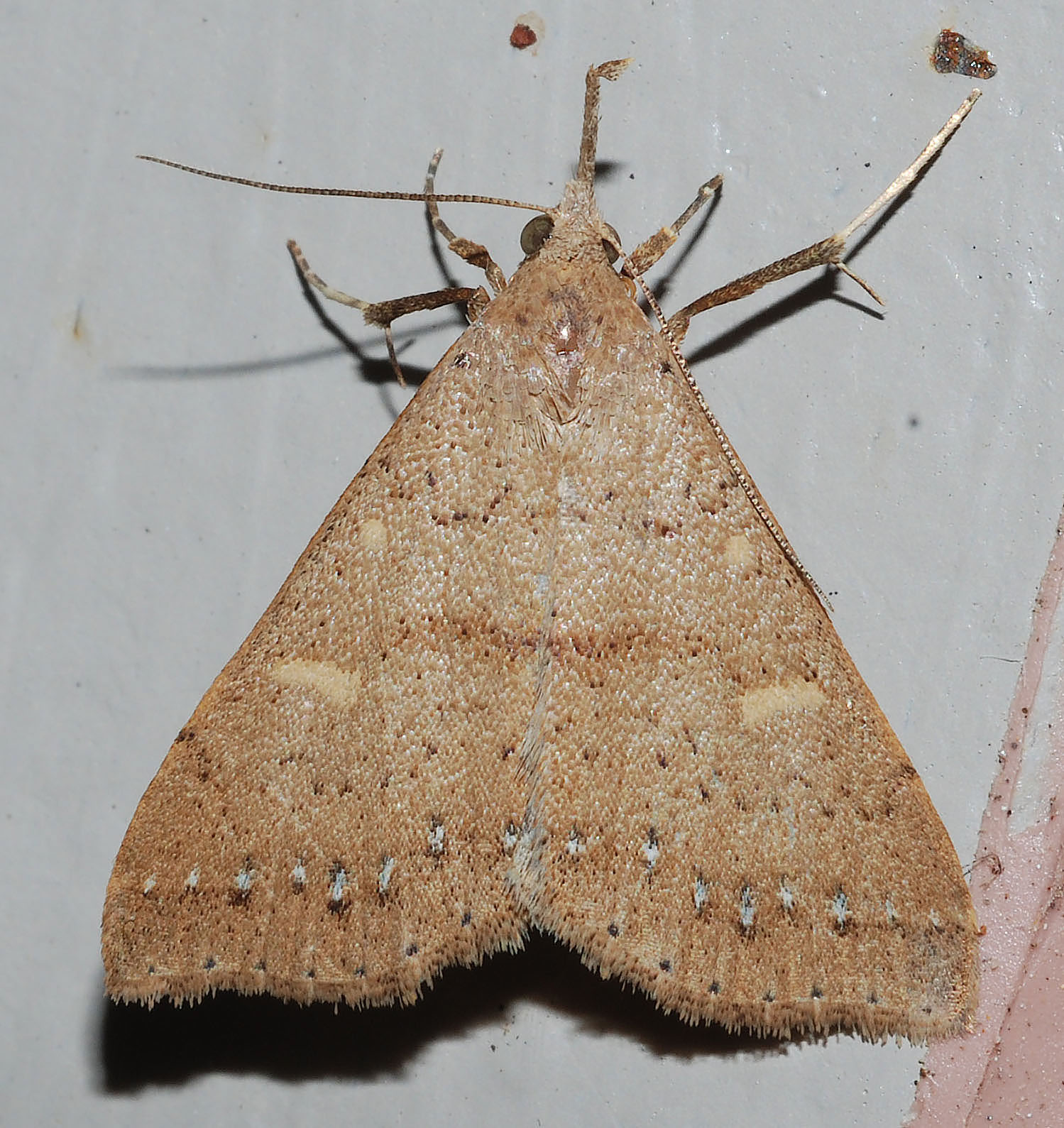

Scientific classification
- Domain: Eukaryota
- Kingdom: Animalia
- Phylum: Arthropoda
- Class: Insecta
- Order: Lepidoptera
- Superfamily: Noctuoidea
- Family: Erebidae
- Genus: Renia
- Species: R. fraternalis

Binomial name
- Renia fraternalis J. B. Smith, 1895

= Renia fraternalis =

Species of moth

Renia fraternalis, the fraternal renia, is a litter moth of the family Erebidae. The species was first described by J. B. Smith in 1895. It is found in North America, including New York, Oklahoma, Arkansas, South Carolina and Florida.

The wingspan is about 25 mm.
