= Tricholita notata =

Scientific classification
- Domain: Eukaryota
- Kingdom: Animalia
- Phylum: Arthropoda
- Class: Insecta
- Order: Lepidoptera
- Superfamily: Noctuoidea
- Family: Noctuidae
- Tribe: Eriopygini
- Genus: Tricholita
- Species: T. notata

Binomial name
- Tricholita notata Strecker, 1898

Species of moth

Tricholita notata, the marked noctuid, is a species of cutworm or dart moth in the family Noctuidae. It is found in North America.

The MONA or Hodges number for Tricholita notata is 10628.

== Subspecies ==
These two subspecies belong to the species Tricholita notata:

- Tricholita notata chicagoensis Wyatt, 1938
- Tricholita notata notata
