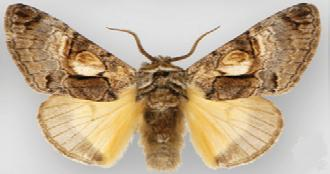
- Male

Scientific classification
- Domain: Eukaryota
- Kingdom: Animalia
- Phylum: Arthropoda
- Class: Insecta
- Order: Lepidoptera
- Superfamily: Noctuoidea
- Family: Noctuidae
- Genus: Charadra
- Species: C. coyopa

Binomial name
- Charadra coyopa Schmidt & Anweiler, 2010

= Charadra coyopa =

Species of moth

Charadra coyopa is a moth of the family Noctuidae. It is known only from the holotype specimen from the Mexico City area.

The length of the forewings is 18.9 mm for males. The collection date indicates a flight period in January.
