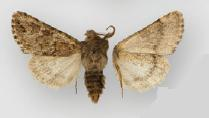
- Male

Scientific classification
- Kingdom: Animalia
- Phylum: Arthropoda
- Clade: Pancrustacea
- Class: Insecta
- Order: Lepidoptera
- Superfamily: Noctuoidea
- Family: Noctuidae
- Genus: Tricholita
- Species: T. ferrisi

Binomial name
- Tricholita ferrisi Crabo & Lafontaine, 2009

= Tricholita ferrisi =

Species of moth

Tricholita ferrisi is a moth of the family Noctuidae. It is only known from Onion Saddle in the Chiricahua Mountains and Ash Canyon in the Huachuca Mountains of extreme south-eastern Arizona at elevations between 1,575 and 2,325 metres. This is the Madrean Sky Islands region of the northern Sierra Madre Occidental's sky islands.

The wingspan is about 28 millimetres (1.1 in). All known specimens were collected by light trap in late July.
