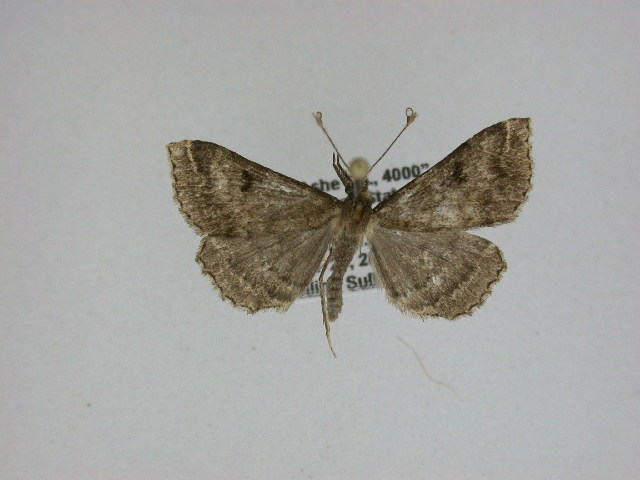

Scientific classification
- Kingdom: Animalia
- Phylum: Arthropoda
- Class: Insecta
- Order: Lepidoptera
- Superfamily: Noctuoidea
- Family: Erebidae
- Genus: Renia
- Species: R. factiosalis

Binomial name
- Renia factiosalis (Walker, 1859)

Synonyms
- Hypena factiosalis Walker, 1859; Renia clitosalis (Walker, 1859); Renia centralis Grote, 1872; Renia plenilinealis Grote, 1872; Renia alutalis Grote, 1872; Renia tilosalis J. B. Smith, 1909

= Renia factiosalis =

Species of moth

Renia factiosalis, the dark-banded renia or sociable renia moth, is a litter moth of the family Erebidae. The species was first described by Francis Walker in 1859. It is found from southern Canada to Florida and Texas.

The wingspan is about 24 mm. Adults are on wing from May to September. There is one generation in the north-east, two generations in Missouri and multiple generations in the south.

The larvae feed on organic matter, including dead leaves.
