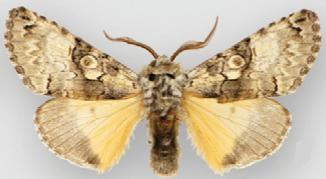
- Male

Scientific classification
- Kingdom: Animalia
- Phylum: Arthropoda
- Clade: Pancrustacea
- Class: Insecta
- Order: Lepidoptera
- Superfamily: Noctuoidea
- Family: Noctuidae
- Genus: Charadra
- Species: C. cakulha

Binomial name
- Charadra cakulha Anweiler & Schmidt, 2010

= Charadra cakulha =

Species of moth

Charadra cakulha is a moth of the family Noctuidae. It is known only from two specimens of the type series, collected in mid-June at San Cristobal de las Casas, Chiapas, Mexico.

The length of the forewings is 19.7 mm for males.
