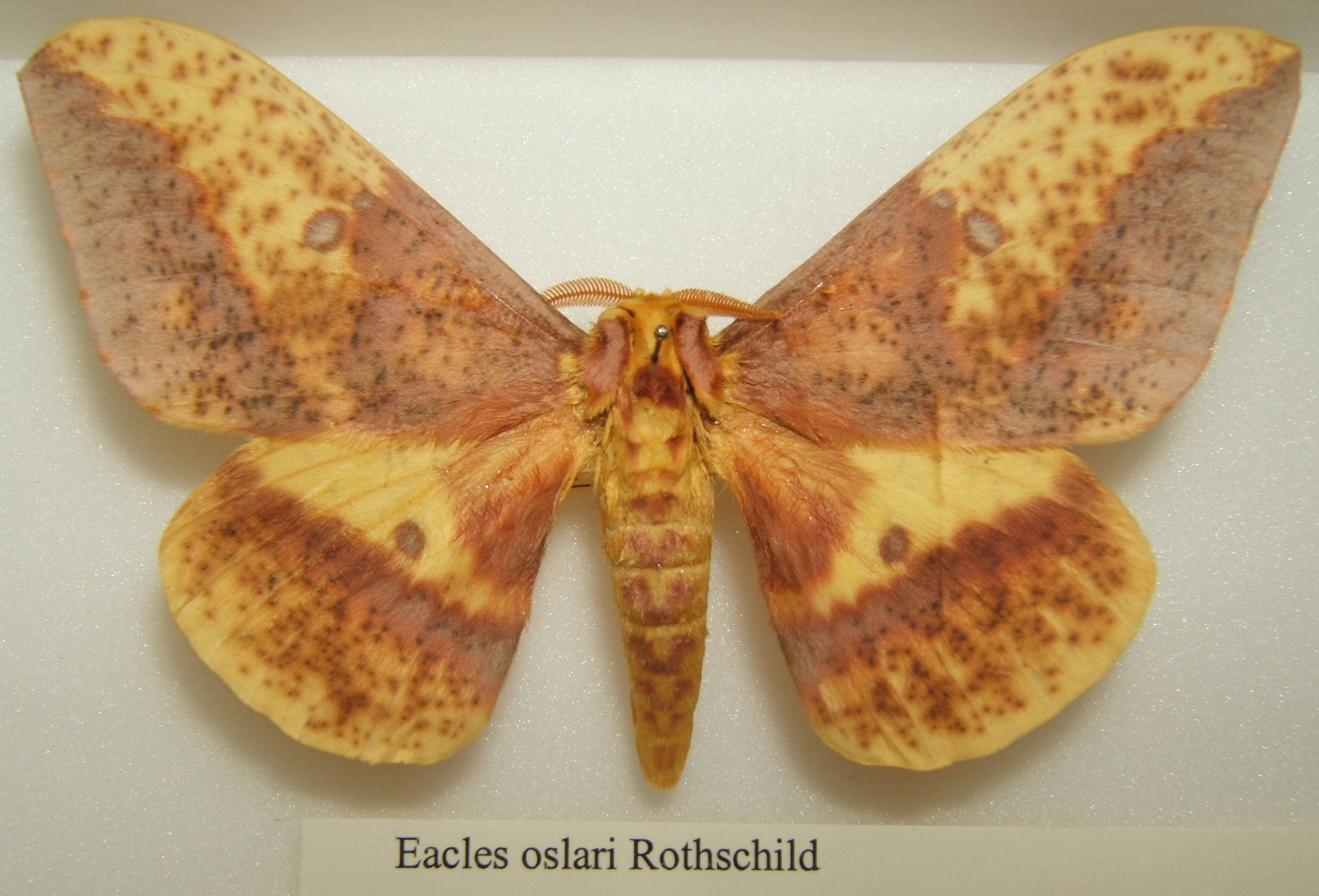

Scientific classification
- Kingdom: Animalia
- Phylum: Arthropoda
- Class: Insecta
- Order: Lepidoptera
- Family: Saturniidae
- Genus: Eacles
- Species: E. oslari

Binomial name
- Eacles oslari Rothschild, 1907

= Eacles oslari =

Oslar's eacles

Species of moth

Eacles oslari, or Oslar's eacles, is a moth of the family Saturniidae. It is found from the Santa Rita, Patagonia, Atascosa and Huachuca mountains of southern Arizona south into Sonora, Sinaloa and Chihuahua in Mexico. Wings vary from yellow to purple brown. The species was first described by Walter Rothschild and Ernest J. Oslar in 1907. Oslar was the first entomology curator for the Colorado Museum of Natural History (currently the Denver Museum of Nature & Science). Oslar was employed by Rothchild to provide specimens, and the moth was later named after him.

The wingspan 112–146 mm. Adults are on wing from July to August. They are vulnerable to predation from bats.

The larvae feed on Quercus oblongifolia, Quercus emoryi and Sapindus saponaria drummondii.
