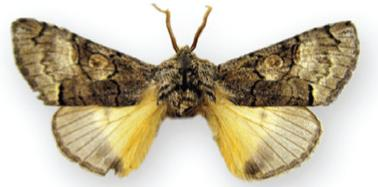

Scientific classification
- Kingdom: Animalia
- Phylum: Arthropoda
- Class: Insecta
- Order: Lepidoptera
- Superfamily: Noctuoidea
- Family: Noctuidae
- Genus: Charadra
- Species: C. patafex

Binomial name
- Charadra patafex Dyar, 1916

= Charadra patafex =

Species of moth

Charadra patafex is a moth of the family Noctuidae. It can be found only in Guerrero Mill in the State of Hidalgo in Mexico, where it was found at 9000 feet elevation.

It is possibly associated with dry oak woodlands at higher elevations.
