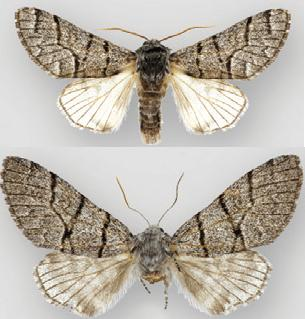
- Panthea judyae male (top), female (bottom)

Scientific classification
- Kingdom: Animalia
- Phylum: Arthropoda
- Clade: Pancrustacea
- Class: Insecta
- Order: Lepidoptera
- Superfamily: Noctuoidea
- Family: Noctuidae
- Genus: Panthea
- Species: P. judyae

Binomial name
- Panthea judyae Anweiler, 2009

= Panthea judyae =

Species of moth

Panthea judyae is a moth of the family Noctuidae. It has been collected in the Mogollon Mountains and Big Burro Mountains of south-western New Mexico, the Huachuca Mountains of south-eastern Arizona, and the Sierra Madre Occidental of northern Mexico, at elevations of 1800–2400 m.

The wingspan is 32–38 mm for males and 42–44 mm for females. Adults are on wing from July to August.
