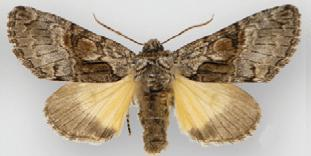
- Female
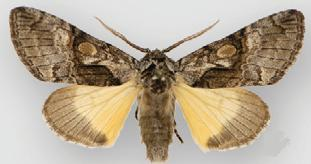
- Male

Scientific classification
- Domain: Eukaryota
- Kingdom: Animalia
- Phylum: Arthropoda
- Class: Insecta
- Order: Lepidoptera
- Superfamily: Noctuoidea
- Family: Noctuidae
- Genus: Charadra
- Species: C. franclemonti

Binomial name
- Charadra franclemonti Anweiler & Schmidt, 2010

= Charadra franclemonti =

Species of moth

Charadra franclemonti is a moth of the family Noctuidae. It is found from central Arizona (Coconino Co.) southward to at least Durango in Mexico.

The length of the forewings is 18 mm for males and 19 mm for females. Adults are on wing from mid-July into August.

Larvae have been reared on Quercus gambelii.
