= Tricholita fistula =

Scientific classification
- Domain: Eukaryota
- Kingdom: Animalia
- Phylum: Arthropoda
- Class: Insecta
- Order: Lepidoptera
- Superfamily: Noctuoidea
- Family: Noctuidae
- Tribe: Eriopygini
- Genus: Tricholita
- Species: T. fistula

Binomial name
- Tricholita fistula Harvey, 1878

Species of moth

Tricholita fistula is a species of cutworm or dart moth in the family Noctuidae. It is found in North America.

The MONA or Hodges number for Tricholita fistula is 10630.
