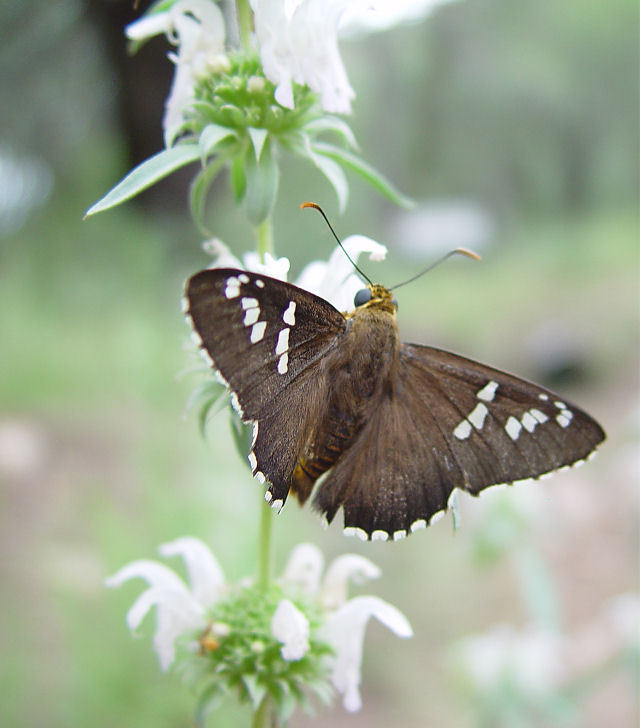
- Apyrrothrix araxes

Scientific classification
- Kingdom: Animalia
- Phylum: Arthropoda
- Class: Insecta
- Order: Lepidoptera
- Family: Hesperiidae
- Tribe: Pyrrhopygini
- Genus: Apyrrothrix; Lindsey, 1921

= Apyrrothrix =

Genus of butterflies

Apyrrothrix is a genus of skippers in the family Hesperiidae.

== Species ==
Funet recognizes two species in the genus Apyrrothrix. While Butterflies of America recognizes Apyrrothrix as a monotypic genus with A. araxes as its sole member and with A. arizonae recognized as subspecies arizonae.

- Apyrrothrix araxes (Hewitson, 1867)
- Apyrrothrix arizonae (Godman & Salvin, 1893) (Sometimes as Apyrrothrix araxes arizonae)
