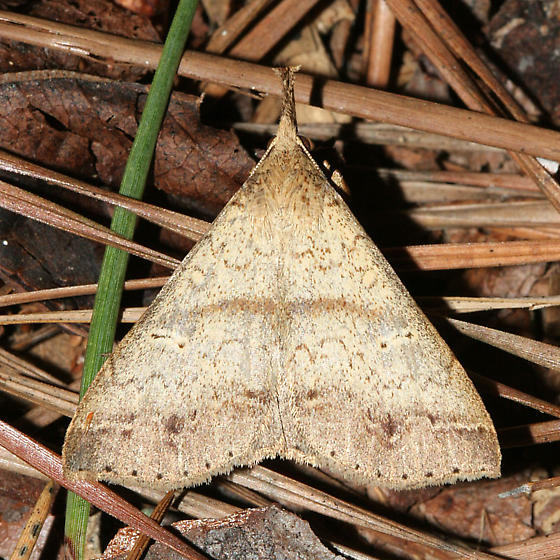

Scientific classification
- Domain: Eukaryota
- Kingdom: Animalia
- Phylum: Arthropoda
- Class: Insecta
- Order: Lepidoptera
- Superfamily: Noctuoidea
- Family: Erebidae
- Genus: Renia
- Species: R. adspergillus

Binomial name
- Renia adspergillus (Bosc, 1800)

Synonyms
- Renia larvalis Grote, 1872; Renia restrictalis Grote, 1872

= Renia adspergillus =

Species of moth

Renia adspergillus, the gray renia or speckled renia moth, is a litter moth of the family Erebidae. The species was first described by Louis Augustin Guillaume Bosc in 1800. It is found in North America from Michigan to Quebec and south to Louisiana and Florida.

The wingspan is about 25 mm. There are multiple generations in the southeast.

Larvae feed beneath a web of silk.
