= Renia pulverosalis =

Scientific classification
- Kingdom: Animalia
- Phylum: Arthropoda
- Class: Insecta
- Order: Lepidoptera
- Superfamily: Noctuoidea
- Family: Erebidae
- Genus: Renia
- Species: R. pulverosalis

Binomial name
- Renia pulverosalis J.B. Smith, 1895

Species of moth

Renia pulverosalis is a litter moth of the family Erebidae. It is found in North America, including Maryland and Utah.
