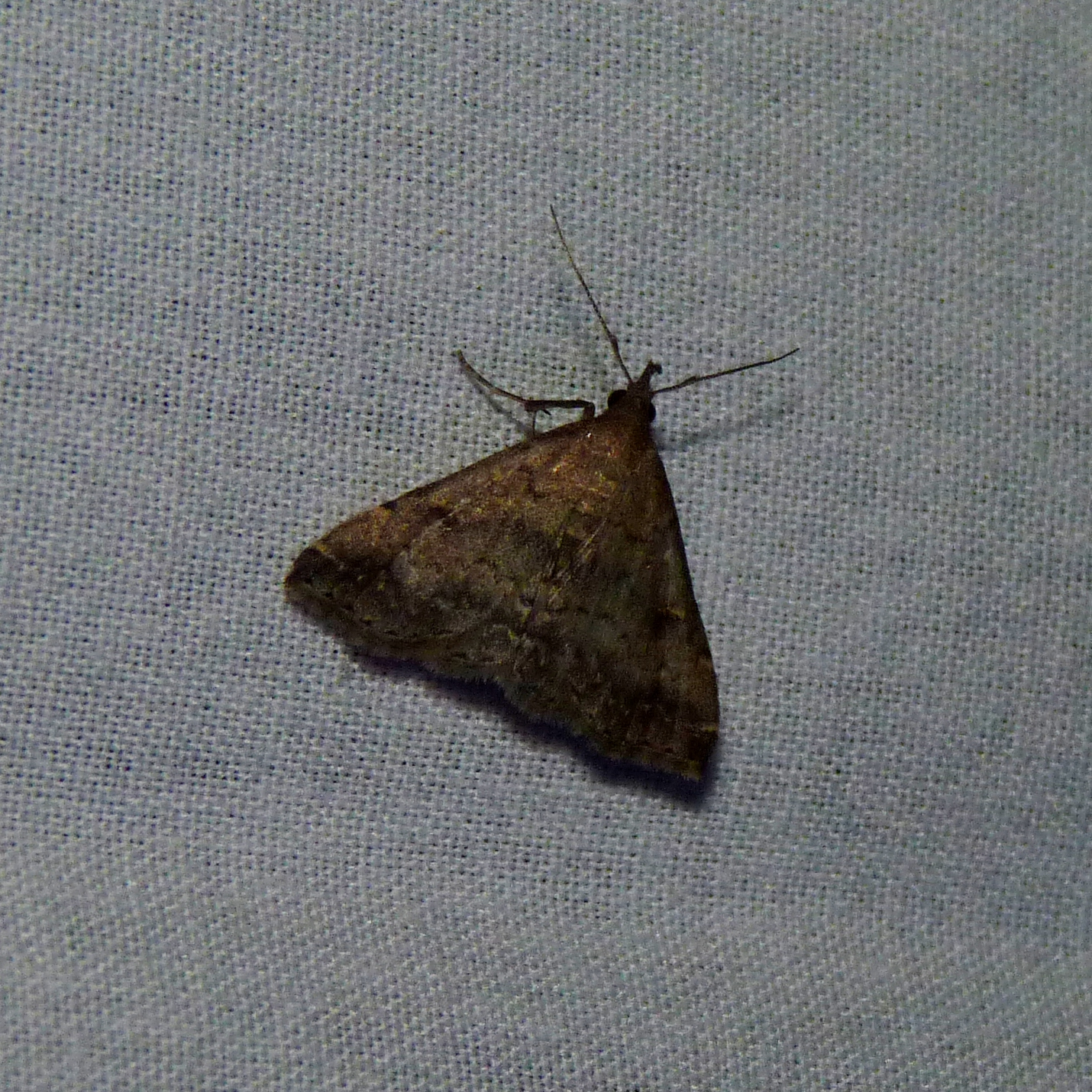
- Tetanolita floridana

Scientific classification
- Kingdom: Animalia
- Phylum: Arthropoda
- Class: Insecta
- Order: Lepidoptera
- Superfamily: Noctuoidea
- Family: Erebidae
- Subfamily: Herminiinae
- Genus: Tetanolita; Grote, 1873

Synonyms
- Scelescepon Möschler, 1890

= Tetanolita =

Genus of moths

Tetanolita is a genus of litter moths of the family Erebidae. The genus was erected by Augustus Radcliffe Grote in 1873.

== Species ==
- Tetanolita borgesalis (Walker, 1859) Brazil (Rio de Janeiro)
- Tetanolita floridana J. B. Smith, 1895 Florida – Florida tetanolita moth
- Tetanolita hermes Schaus, 1916 Paraguay
- Tetanolita mutatalis (Möschler, 1890) Puerto Rico, Bahamas
- Tetanolita mynesalis (Walker, 1859) Alabama, Texas – smoky tetanolita moth
- Tetanolita negalis Barnes & McDunnough, 1912 Arizona
- Tetanolita nisonalis (Walker, [1859]) Venezuela
- Tetanolita nolualis (Schaus, 1906) Mexico
- Tetanolita palligera (J. B. Smith, 1884) California
