= Renia rigida =

Scientific classification
- Kingdom: Animalia
- Phylum: Arthropoda
- Class: Insecta
- Order: Lepidoptera
- Superfamily: Noctuoidea
- Family: Erebidae
- Genus: Renia
- Species: R. rigida

Binomial name
- Renia rigida J.B. Smith, 1905

Species of moth

Renia rigida is a litter moth of the family Erebidae. It is found in North America, including Iowa, Utah and Arizona.
