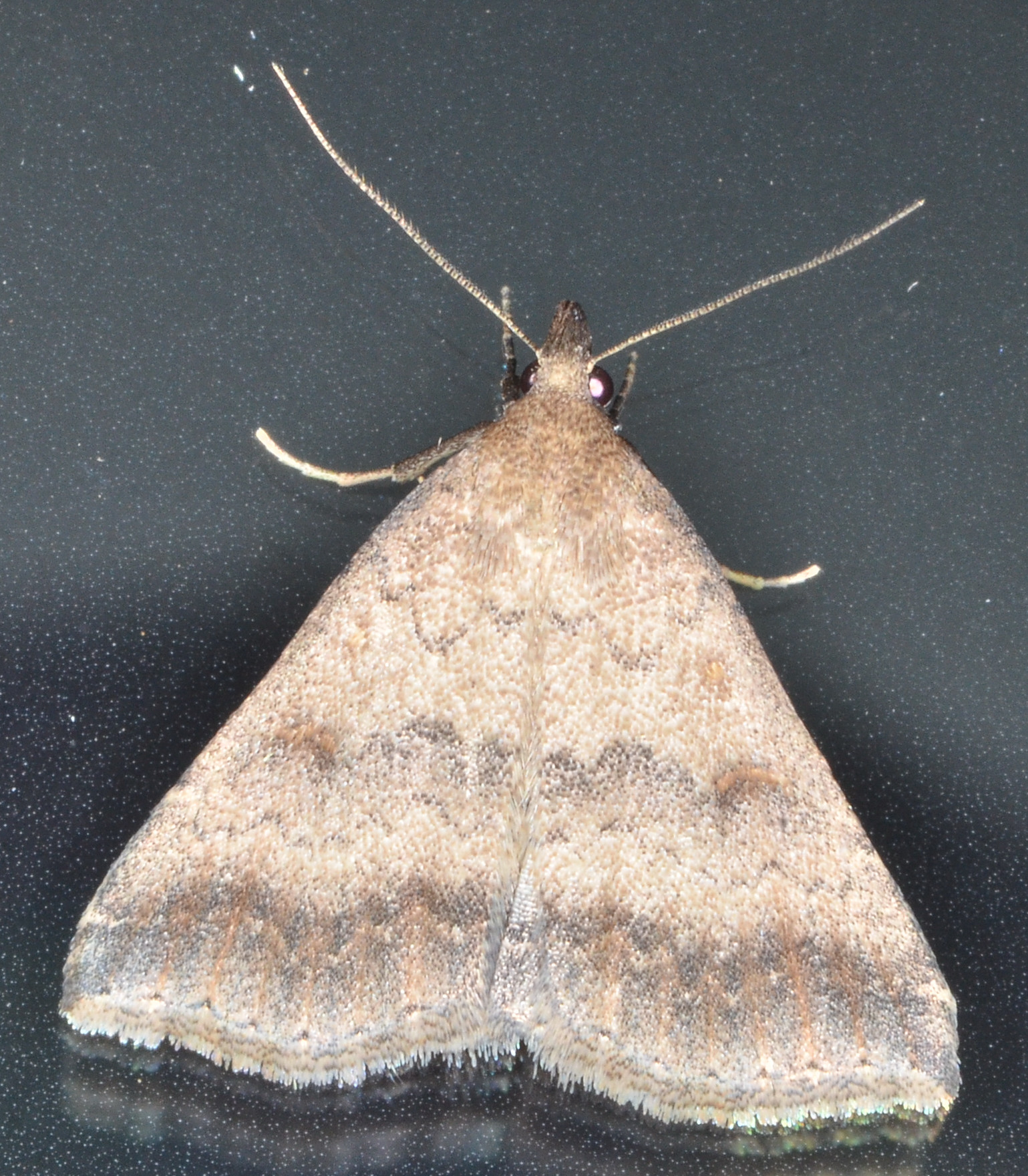

Scientific classification
- Domain: Eukaryota
- Kingdom: Animalia
- Phylum: Arthropoda
- Class: Insecta
- Order: Lepidoptera
- Superfamily: Noctuoidea
- Family: Erebidae
- Genus: Tetanolita
- Species: T. palligera

Binomial name
- Tetanolita palligera J.B. Smith, 1884

Synonyms
- Tetanolita greta J. B. Smith, 1909

= Tetanolita palligera =

Species of moth

Tetanolita palligera is a litter moth of the family Erebidae. It is found from British Columbia south to Oregon, Arizona and California.
