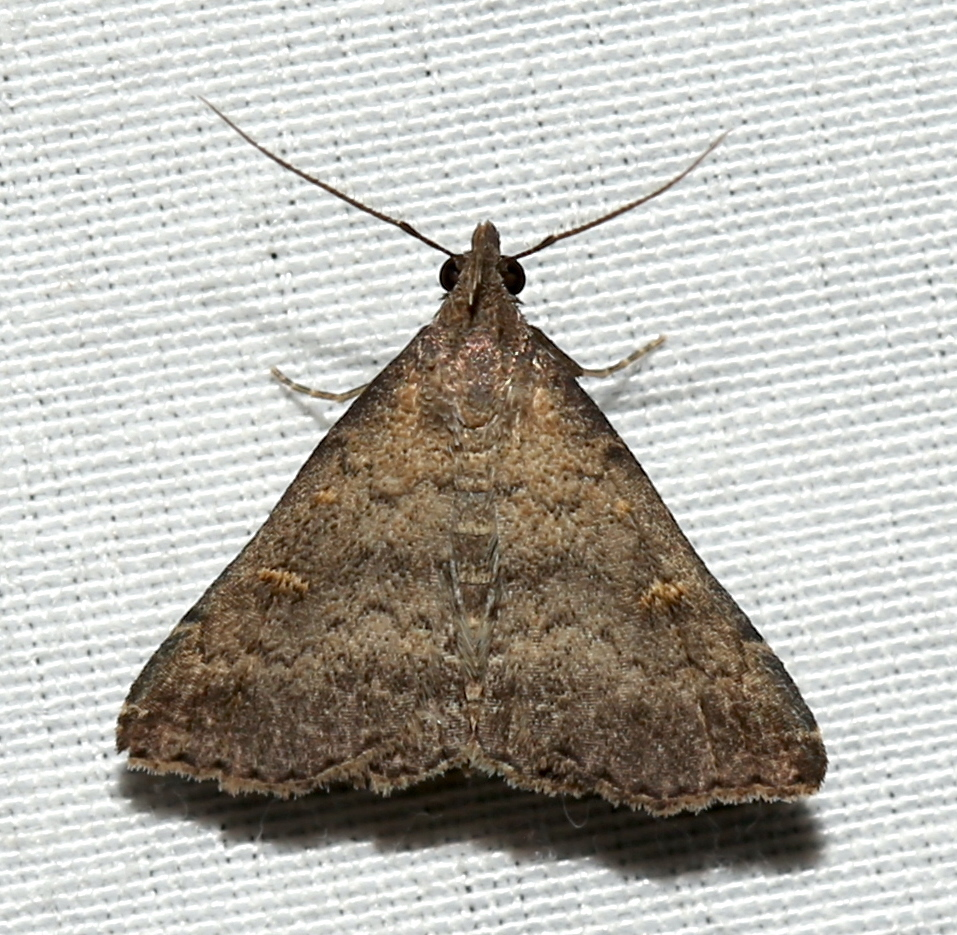

Scientific classification
- Kingdom: Animalia
- Phylum: Arthropoda
- Class: Insecta
- Order: Lepidoptera
- Superfamily: Noctuoidea
- Family: Erebidae
- Genus: Tetanolita
- Species: T. floridana

Binomial name
- Tetanolita floridana J. B. Smith, 1895

Synonyms
- Tetanolita floridana fulata J. B. Smith, 1909

= Tetanolita floridana =

Species of moth

Tetanolita floridana, the Florida owlet or Florida tetanolita moth, is a litter moth of the family Erebidae. The species was first described by J. B. Smith in 1895. It is found in the United States from Wisconsin to Long Island, south to Florida and Texas.

The wingspan is 20–24 mm. Adults are on wing from April to October in the central portion of its range, and all year round in the far south and from June to September in Ohio. There are two or more generations in the east.

Larvae probably feed on fallen organic matter.
