= Tetanolita negalis =

Scientific classification
- Kingdom: Animalia
- Phylum: Arthropoda
- Class: Insecta
- Order: Lepidoptera
- Superfamily: Noctuoidea
- Family: Erebidae
- Genus: Tetanolita
- Species: T. negalis

Binomial name
- Tetanolita negalis Barnes & McDunnough, 1912

Species of moth

Tetanolita negalis is a litter moth of the family Erebidae first described by William Barnes and James Halliday McDunnough in 1912. It is found in the Huachuca Mountains of Arizona in the United States.
