= Renia nemoralis =

Scientific classification
- Domain: Eukaryota
- Kingdom: Animalia
- Phylum: Arthropoda
- Class: Insecta
- Order: Lepidoptera
- Superfamily: Noctuoidea
- Family: Erebidae
- Genus: Renia
- Species: R. nemoralis

Binomial name
- Renia nemoralis Barnes & McDunnough, 1918

Species of moth

Renia nemoralis, the tardy renia or chocolate renia moth, is a litter moth of the family Erebidae. It is found in the US from Illinois to south-eastern Massachusetts south to Florida and Texas. The species was first described by William Barnes and James Halliday McDunnough in 1918.

The wingspan is 28–30 mm. There is one generation per year.

The larvae feed on organic matter, including dead leaves.
