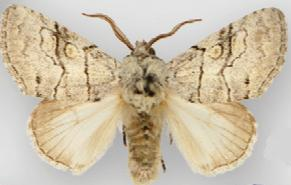
- Male

Scientific classification
- Kingdom: Animalia
- Phylum: Arthropoda
- Class: Insecta
- Order: Lepidoptera
- Superfamily: Noctuoidea
- Family: Noctuidae
- Genus: Charadra
- Species: C. dispulsa

Binomial name
- Charadra dispulsa Morrison, 1875

= Charadra dispulsa =

Species of moth

Charadra dispulsa is a moth of the family Noctuidae. Its range spans from Texas southward and westward to at least San Luis Potosí, Mexico.

The wingspan is about 34 mm. Adults are on wing from March through May and July in southern Texas.

Nothing is known of the larval stages or food plants, but the larvae are possibly oak feeders.
