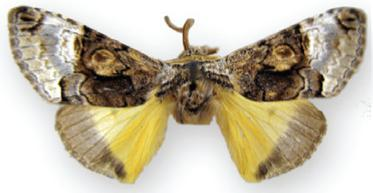

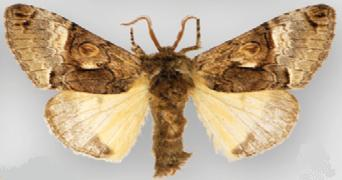
- Male

Scientific classification
- Domain: Eukaryota
- Kingdom: Animalia
- Phylum: Arthropoda
- Class: Insecta
- Order: Lepidoptera
- Superfamily: Noctuoidea
- Family: Noctuidae
- Genus: Charadra
- Species: C. oligarchia

Binomial name
- Charadra oligarchia Dyar, 1916

= Charadra oligarchia =

Species of moth

Charadra oligarchia is a moth of the family Noctuidae. It is known only from Guerrero Mill in the State of Hidalgo in Mexico, where it was found at 9000 feet elevation.

It is possibly associated with dry oak woodlands at higher elevations.
