= Tricholita baranca =

Scientific classification
- Domain: Eukaryota
- Kingdom: Animalia
- Phylum: Arthropoda
- Class: Insecta
- Order: Lepidoptera
- Superfamily: Noctuoidea
- Family: Noctuidae
- Genus: Tricholita
- Species: T. baranca

Binomial name
- Tricholita baranca Barnes, 1905

Species of moth

Tricholita baranca is a species of cutworm or dart moth in the family Noctuidae. It was first described by William Barnes in 1905 and it is found in North America.

The MONA or Hodges number for Tricholita baranca is 10629.
