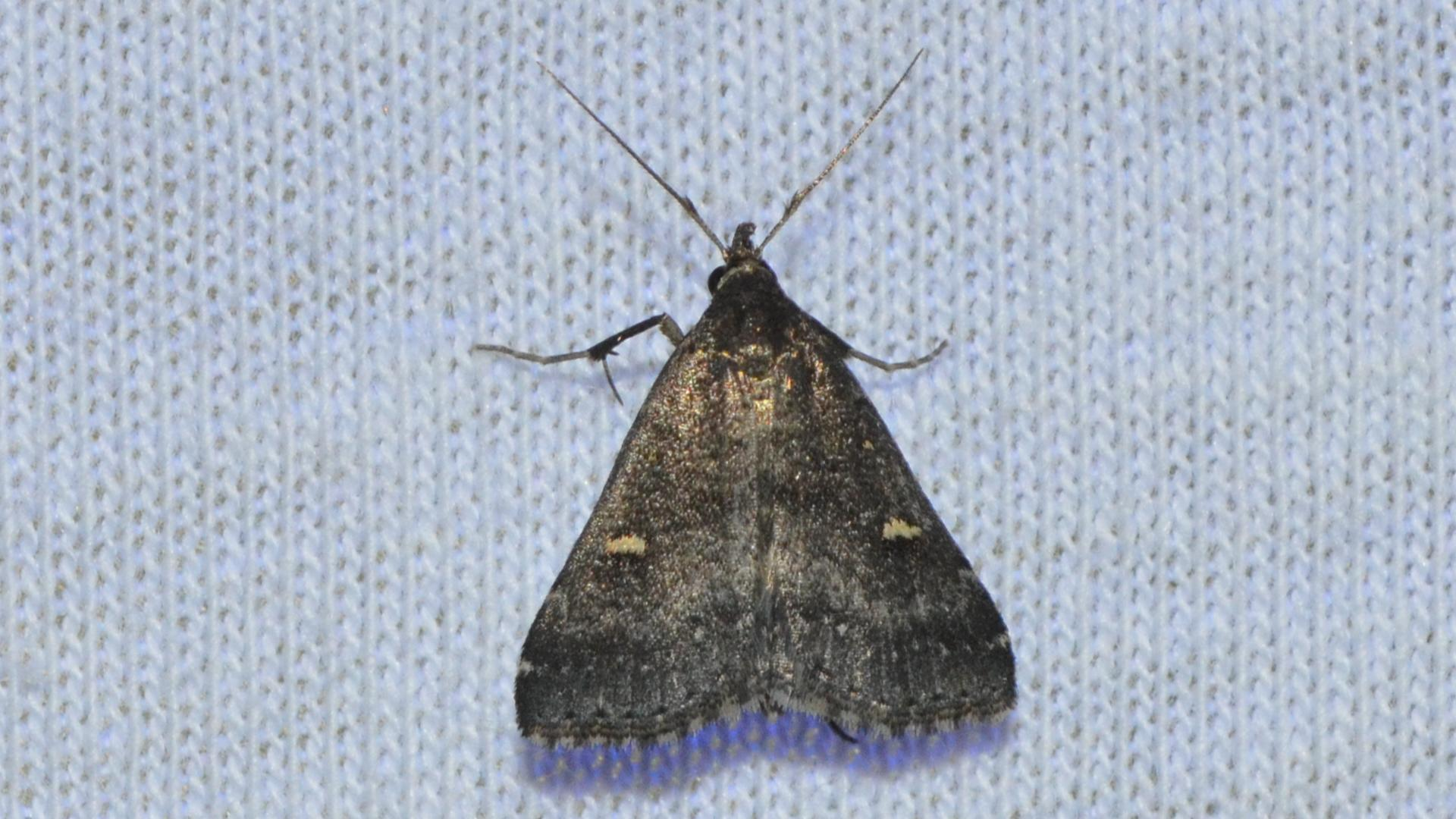

Scientific classification
- Kingdom: Animalia
- Phylum: Arthropoda
- Class: Insecta
- Order: Lepidoptera
- Superfamily: Noctuoidea
- Family: Erebidae
- Genus: Tetanolita
- Species: T. mynesalis

Binomial name
- Tetanolita mynesalis Walker, 1859

Synonyms
- Tetanolita lixalis Grote, 1873

= Tetanolita mynesalis =

Species of moth

Tetanolita mynesalis, the smoky tetanolita, is a litter moth of the family Erebidae. The species was first described by Francis Walker in 1859. It is found in eastern North America.

The wingspan is 20–25 mm. Adults are on wing from May to November.

Larvae probably feed on dead leaves.

== Subspecies ==
- Tetanolita mynesalis mynesalis
- Tetanolita mynesalis inaequalis Ferguson, Hilburn & Wright, 1991 (Bermuda).
