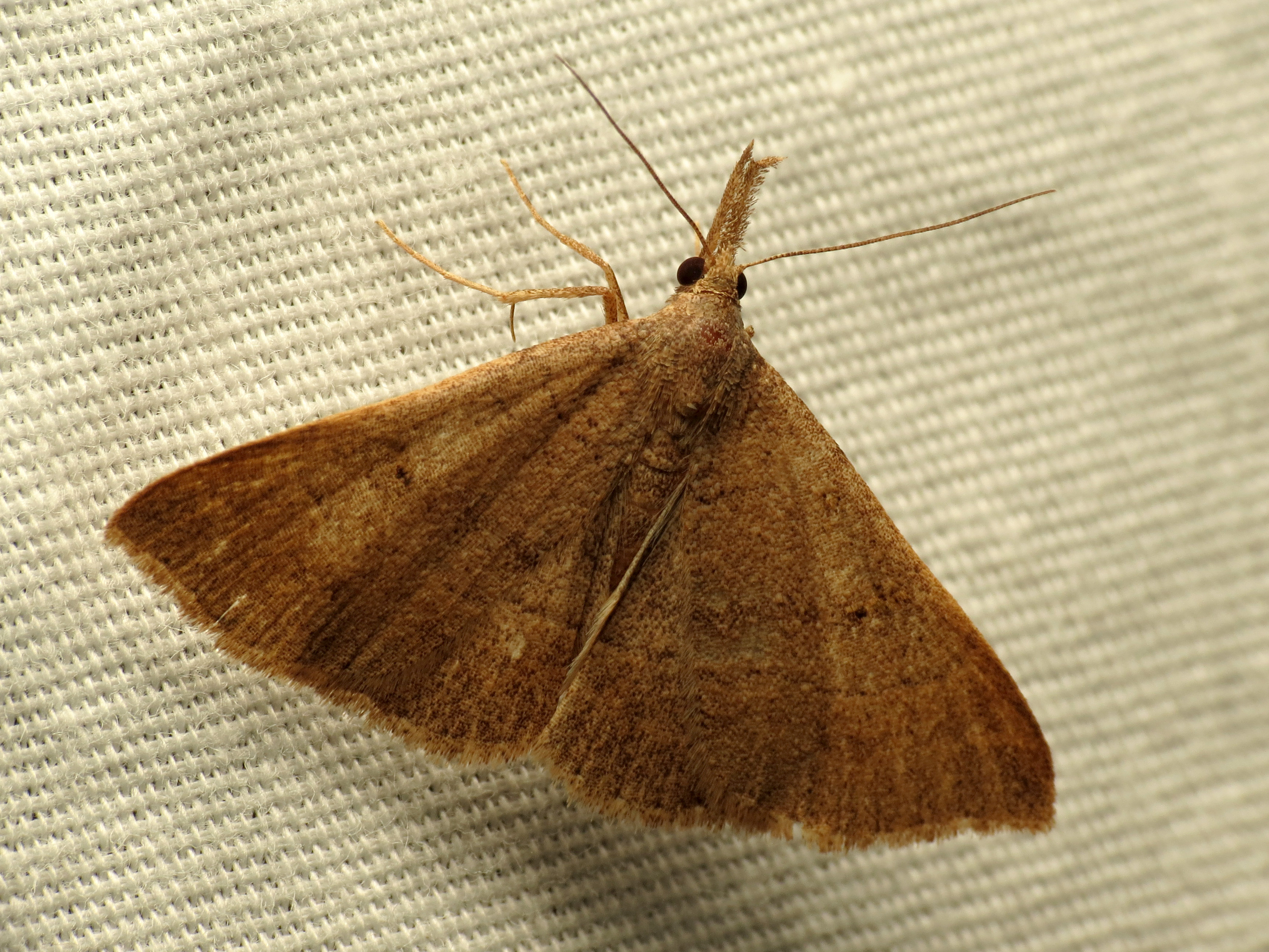

Scientific classification
- Kingdom: Animalia
- Phylum: Arthropoda
- Class: Insecta
- Order: Lepidoptera
- Superfamily: Noctuoidea
- Family: Erebidae
- Genus: Renia
- Species: R. hutsoni

Binomial name
- Renia hutsoni J.B. Smith, 1906

= Renia hutsoni =

Species of moth

Renia hutsoni is a litter moth of the family Erebidae. It is found in North America, including Arizona, Colorado and Utah.

The wingspan is about 27 mm (1.1 in).
