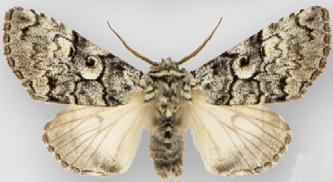
- Male Charadra deridens

Scientific classification
- Kingdom: Animalia
- Phylum: Arthropoda
- Class: Insecta
- Order: Lepidoptera
- Superfamily: Noctuoidea
- Family: Noctuidae
- Subfamily: Pantheinae
- Genus: Charadra; Walker, 1865

= Charadra (moth) =

Genus of moths

Charadra is a genus of moths of the family Noctuidae.

== Species ==
- pata group
  - Charadra cakulha Schmidt & Anweiler, 2010
  - Charadra coyopa Schmidt & Anweiler, 2010
  - Charadra franclemonti Anweiler & Schmidt, 2010
  - Charadra oligarchia Dyar, 1916
  - Charadra pata Druce, 1894
  - Charadra patafex Dyar, 1916
  - Charadra tapa Schmidt & Anweiler, 2010
- deridens group
  - Charadra deridens Guenée, 1952
  - Charadra dispulsa Morrison, 1875
  - Charadra moneta Schmidt & Anweiler, 2010
  - Charadra nitens Schaus, 1911
- nigracreta group
  - Charadra nigracreta H. Edwards, 1884
