= Tetanolita mutatalis =

Scientific classification
- Domain: Eukaryota
- Kingdom: Animalia
- Phylum: Arthropoda
- Class: Insecta
- Order: Lepidoptera
- Superfamily: Noctuoidea
- Family: Erebidae
- Genus: Tetanolita
- Species: T. mutatalis

Binomial name
- Tetanolita mutatalis (Möschler, 1890)

Synonyms
- Scelescepon mutatalis Möschler, 1890

Species of moth

Tetanolita mutatalis is a litter moth of the family Erebidae. It is found in Puerto Rico, the Bahamas, Jamaica and Cuba.
