= Renia subterminalis =

Scientific classification
- Kingdom: Animalia
- Phylum: Arthropoda
- Class: Insecta
- Order: Lepidoptera
- Superfamily: Noctuoidea
- Family: Erebidae
- Genus: Renia
- Species: R. subterminalis

Binomial name
- Renia subterminalis Barnes & McDunnough, 1912

Species of moth

Renia subterminalis is a litter moth of the family Erebidae. It is found in North America, including and possibly limited to the Huachuca Mountains of Arizona. The species was first described by William Barnes and James Halliday McDunnough in 1912.
