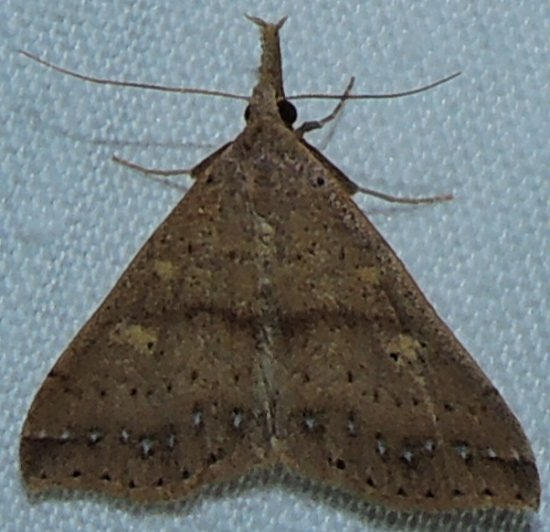

Scientific classification
- Kingdom: Animalia
- Phylum: Arthropoda
- Class: Insecta
- Order: Lepidoptera
- Superfamily: Noctuoidea
- Family: Erebidae
- Genus: Renia
- Species: R. sobrialis

Binomial name
- Renia sobrialis (Walker, 1859)

= Renia sobrialis =

Species of moth

Renia sobrialis, the sober renia, is a litter moth of the family Erebidae. The species was first described by Francis Walker in 1859. It is found from Nova Scotia to Florida, west to Mississippi and Minnesota.

The wingspan is 24–27 mm. Adults are on wing from April to September.

The larvae feed on dead leaves.
