= Tetanolita borgesalis =

Scientific classification
- Kingdom: Animalia
- Phylum: Arthropoda
- Class: Insecta
- Order: Lepidoptera
- Superfamily: Noctuoidea
- Family: Erebidae
- Genus: Tetanolita
- Species: T. borgesalis

Binomial name
- Tetanolita borgesalis Walker, 1859

Synonyms
- Herminia inostentalis Walker, 1862; Bleptina diruptalis Walker, 1866

Species of moth

Tetanolita borgesalis is a litter moth of the family Erebidae first described by Francis Walker in 1859. It is found in South America, including the French Antilles and Brazil.
