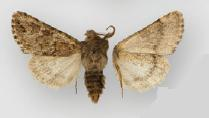
- Tricholita ferrisi

Scientific classification
- Kingdom: Animalia
- Phylum: Arthropoda
- Class: Insecta
- Order: Lepidoptera
- Superfamily: Noctuoidea
- Family: Noctuidae
- Tribe: Eriopygini
- Genus: Tricholita; Grote, 1875

= Tricholita =

Genus of moths

Tricholita is a genus of moths in the family Noctuidae.

== Species ==
- Tricholita baranca Barnes, 1905
- Tricholita bisulca (Grote, 1881)
- Tricholita chipeta Barnes, 1904
- Tricholita elsinora (Barnes, 1904)
- Tricholita ferrisi Crabo & Lafontaine, 2009
- Tricholita fistula Harvey, 1878
- Tricholita knudsoni Crabo & Lafontaine, 2009
- Tricholita notata Strecker, 1898
- Tricholita palmillo (Barnes, 1907)
- Tricholita signata (Walker, 1860)
