= Tetanolita hermes =

Scientific classification
- Domain: Eukaryota
- Kingdom: Animalia
- Phylum: Arthropoda
- Class: Insecta
- Order: Lepidoptera
- Superfamily: Noctuoidea
- Family: Erebidae
- Genus: Tetanolita
- Species: T. hermes

Binomial name
- Tetanolita hermes Schaus, 1916

Species of moth

Tetanolita hermes is a litter moth of the family Erebidae first described by William Schaus in 1916. It is found in Paraguay.
