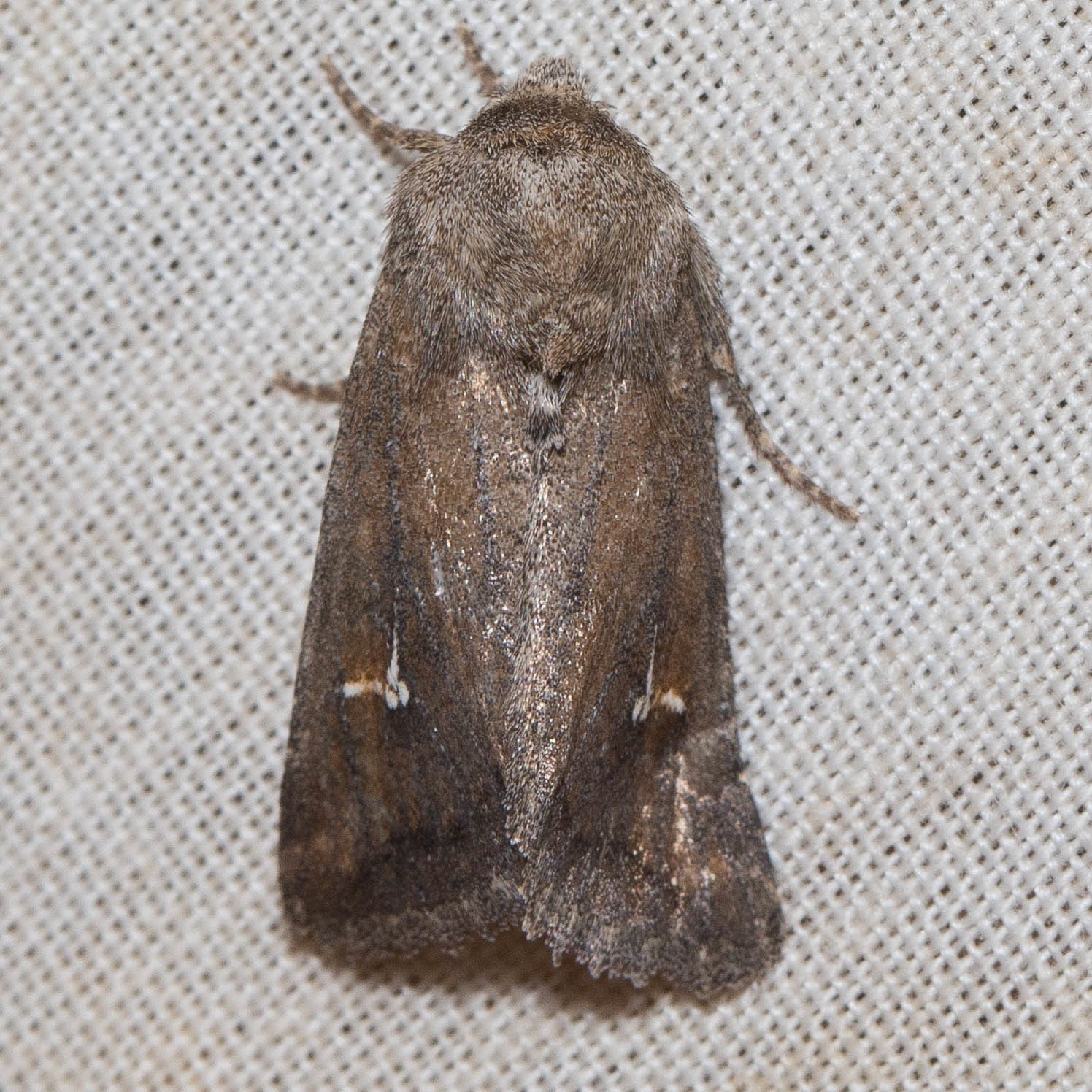

Scientific classification
- Domain: Eukaryota
- Kingdom: Animalia
- Phylum: Arthropoda
- Class: Insecta
- Order: Lepidoptera
- Superfamily: Noctuoidea
- Family: Noctuidae
- Genus: Tricholita
- Species: T. chipeta

Binomial name
- Tricholita chipeta Barnes, 1904

= Tricholita chipeta =

Species of moth

Tricholita chipeta is a species of cutworm or dart moth in the family Noctuidae. It was first described by William Barnes in 1904 and it is found in North America.
