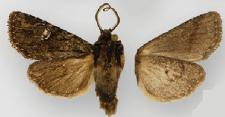
- Male
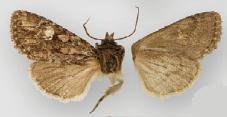
- Female

Scientific classification
- Domain: Eukaryota
- Kingdom: Animalia
- Phylum: Arthropoda
- Class: Insecta
- Order: Lepidoptera
- Superfamily: Noctuoidea
- Family: Noctuidae
- Genus: Tricholita
- Species: T. knudsoni

Binomial name
- Tricholita knudsoni Crabo & Lafontaine, 2009

= Tricholita knudsoni =

Species of moth

Tricholita knudsoni is a moth of the family Noctuidae. It is known from western Texas from Concan westward to the Chisos, Davis, and Guadalupe Mountains.

The wingspan is 33–35 millimetres (1.3–1.4 in). All known specimens were collected at light between late August and late October.
