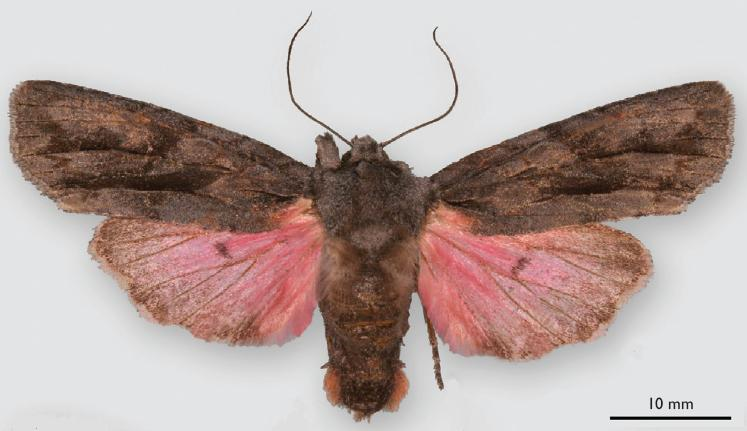

Scientific classification
- Domain: Eukaryota
- Kingdom: Animalia
- Phylum: Arthropoda
- Class: Insecta
- Order: Lepidoptera
- Superfamily: Noctuoidea
- Family: Noctuidae
- Genus: Lithophane
- Species: L. leeae

Binomial name
- Lithophane leeae Walsh, 2009

= Lithophane leeae =

Species of moth in Arizona

Lithophane leeae is a moth of the family Noctuidae. It is only found in the Chiricahua Mountains in southeastern Arizona.

The length of the forewings is about 25 millimetres (0.98 in).
