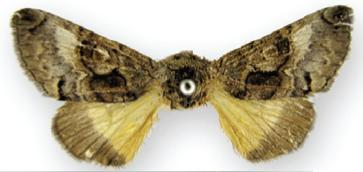

Scientific classification
- Domain: Eukaryota
- Kingdom: Animalia
- Phylum: Arthropoda
- Class: Insecta
- Order: Lepidoptera
- Superfamily: Noctuoidea
- Family: Noctuidae
- Genus: Charadra
- Species: C. pata

Binomial name
- Charadra pata (Druce, 1894)

Synonyms
- Trisulodes pata Druce, 1894; Charadra patens J. B. Smith, 1908 (misspelling); Charadra basiflava J. B. Smith, 1908 (unavailable name)

= Charadra pata =

Species of moth

Charadra pata is a moth of the family Noctuidae. It is known only from Guatemala City in Guatemala.

Nothing is known of the biology, although the larvae possibly feed on oak.
