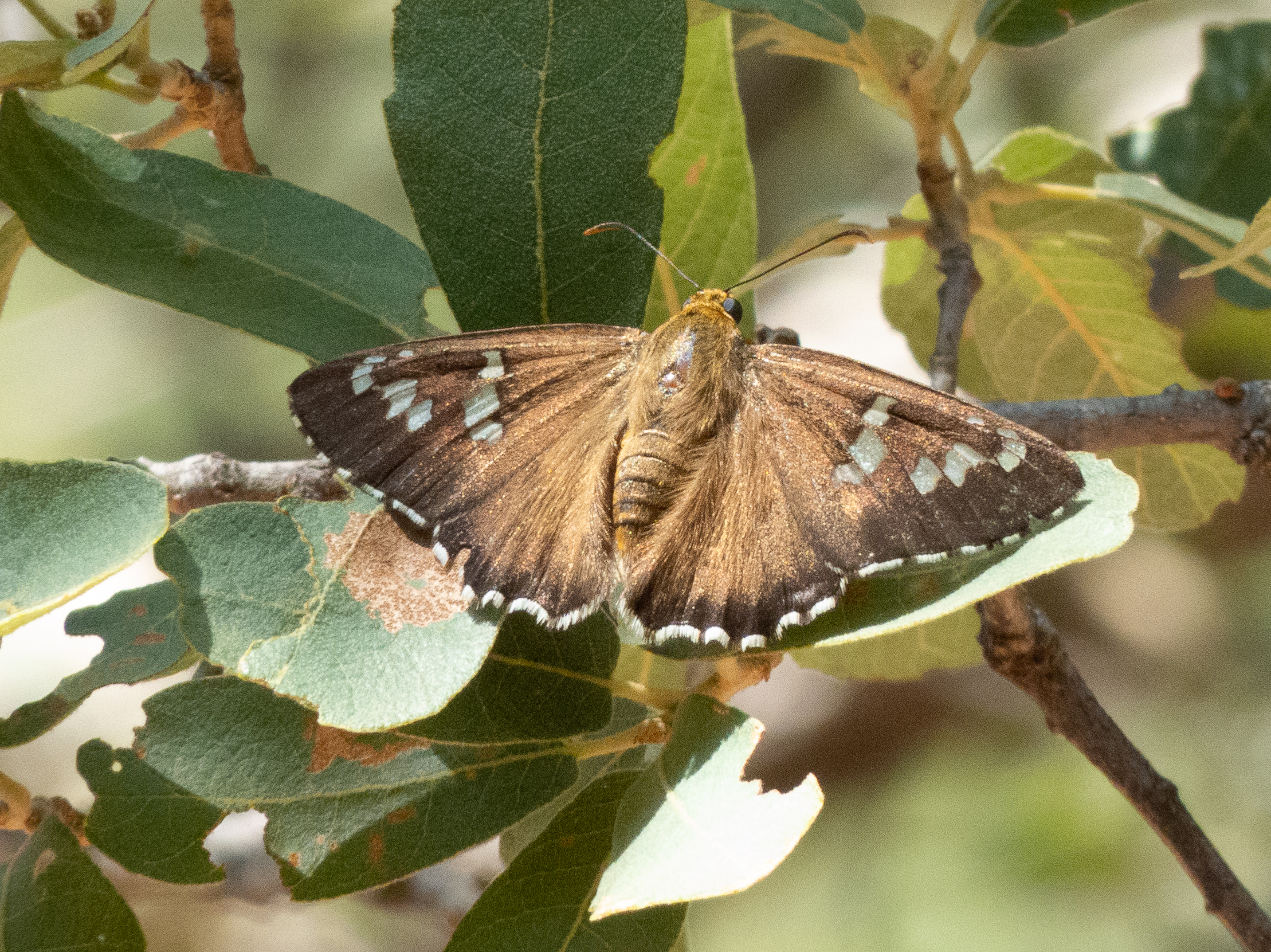

Conservation status
- Secure (NatureServe)

Scientific classification
- Kingdom: Animalia
- Phylum: Arthropoda
- Class: Insecta
- Order: Lepidoptera
- Family: Hesperiidae
- Genus: Apyrrothrix
- Species: A. araxes

Binomial name
- Apyrrothrix araxes (Hewitson, 1867)

Synonyms
- Pyrrhopyga cyrillus Plötz, 1879; Pyrrhopyge araxes (Hewitson, 1867); Erycides araxes Hewitson, 1867

= Apyrrothrix araxes =

Species of butterfly

Apyrrothrix araxes, also known as the dull firetip and the golf-club skipper, is a North American butterfly in the family Hesperiidae. It is the only butterfly in the subfamily Pyrrhopyginae that occurs in the United States. It is also sometimes found in Mexico. They usually perch with their wings fully or partly open. Adults are very fond of flowers. Their flight is direct and quite fast, usually flying high above trees.

== Description ==
The upper side of the wings is brown with the fore wings having several glassy white spots. The underside of the wings is brown with the body and basal area of the wings bright yellow-orange. The wingspan is between 1 3/4 - 2 1/4 inches or 4.5 - 5.7 centimeters.

== Habitat ==
The dull firetip lives in habitats such as southwestern oak woodlands, roadsides, streamsides, and forest trails.

== Flight ==
Adults may be seen from August to November (they are most common in September). There are several broods between June and November.

== Life cycle ==
The larvae live in a folded-over leaf nest. The yellow-banded larva is red-brown with white-hairs. The head is black with white and orange hairs. The pupa is brownish-red with maroon joints and the abdomen dull orange. It is covered with white hairs (except on the wing cases) and has orange hairs on the top of the head. The partially grown larva builds a small nest on the host plant where it will overwinter. It has 1 brood per year.

== Host plants ==
Here is a list of host plants that Apyrrothrix araxes uses:

- Emory oak, Quercus emoryi
- Toumey oak, Quercus toumeyi
- Arizona white oak, Quercus arizonica
- Gray oak, Quercus grisea
