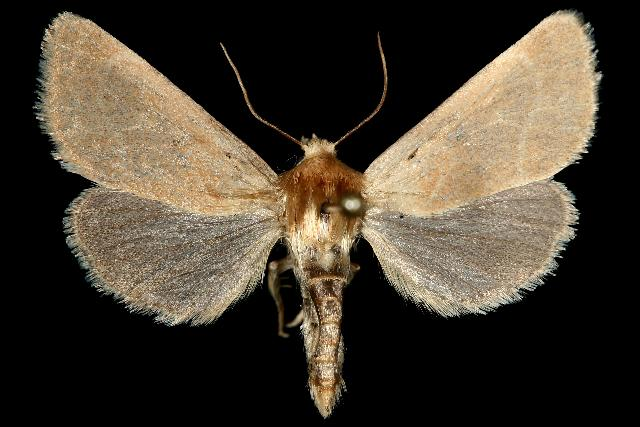

Scientific classification
- Kingdom: Animalia
- Phylum: Arthropoda
- Class: Insecta
- Order: Lepidoptera
- Superfamily: Noctuoidea
- Family: Noctuidae
- Genus: Schinia
- Species: S. immaculata

Binomial name
- Schinia immaculata Pogue, 2004

= Schinia immaculata =

Species of moth

Schinia immaculata is a moth of the family Noctuidae. It is endemic to the area surrounding the Colorado River in the Grand Canyon in Coconino County, Arizona.

The wingspan is about 20 mm. Adults are on wing from April to May.

The larval food plant is unknown, but the vegetation in the areas where it is found are dominated by Tamarix Prosopis, Acacia and desert shrubs.
