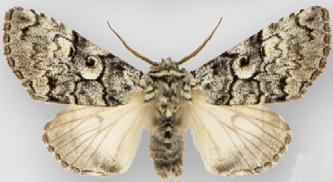
- Male
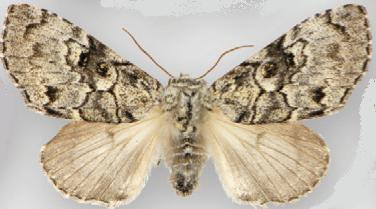
- Female

Scientific classification
- Kingdom: Animalia
- Phylum: Arthropoda
- Class: Insecta
- Order: Lepidoptera
- Superfamily: Noctuoidea
- Family: Noctuidae
- Genus: Charadra
- Species: C. deridens

Binomial name
- Charadra deridens (Guenée, 1852)

Synonyms
- Charadra circulifera (Walker, 1857); Charadra contigua Walker, 1865; Charadra sudena J. B. Smith, 1908; Charadra nigrosuffusana Strand, 1917 (form); Charadra fumosa Draudt, 1924; Charadra ingenua J. B. Smith, 1906; Phalaena Bombyx corylina Martyn, 1797; Diphthera deridens Guenée, 1852; Acronycta circulifera Walker, 1857

= Charadra deridens =

Species of moth

Charadra deridens (laugher or marbled tuffet moth) is a moth of the family Noctuidae. It is found in Ontario, Quebec, New Brunswick, Nova Scotia, Prince Edward Island, British Columbia, Saskatchewan and Manitoba in Canada, through most of the United States except the south-western states.

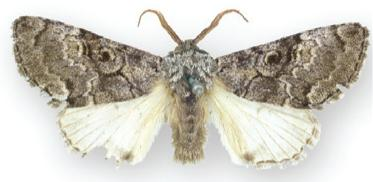
Charadra ingenua, now considered a synonym of Charadra deridens

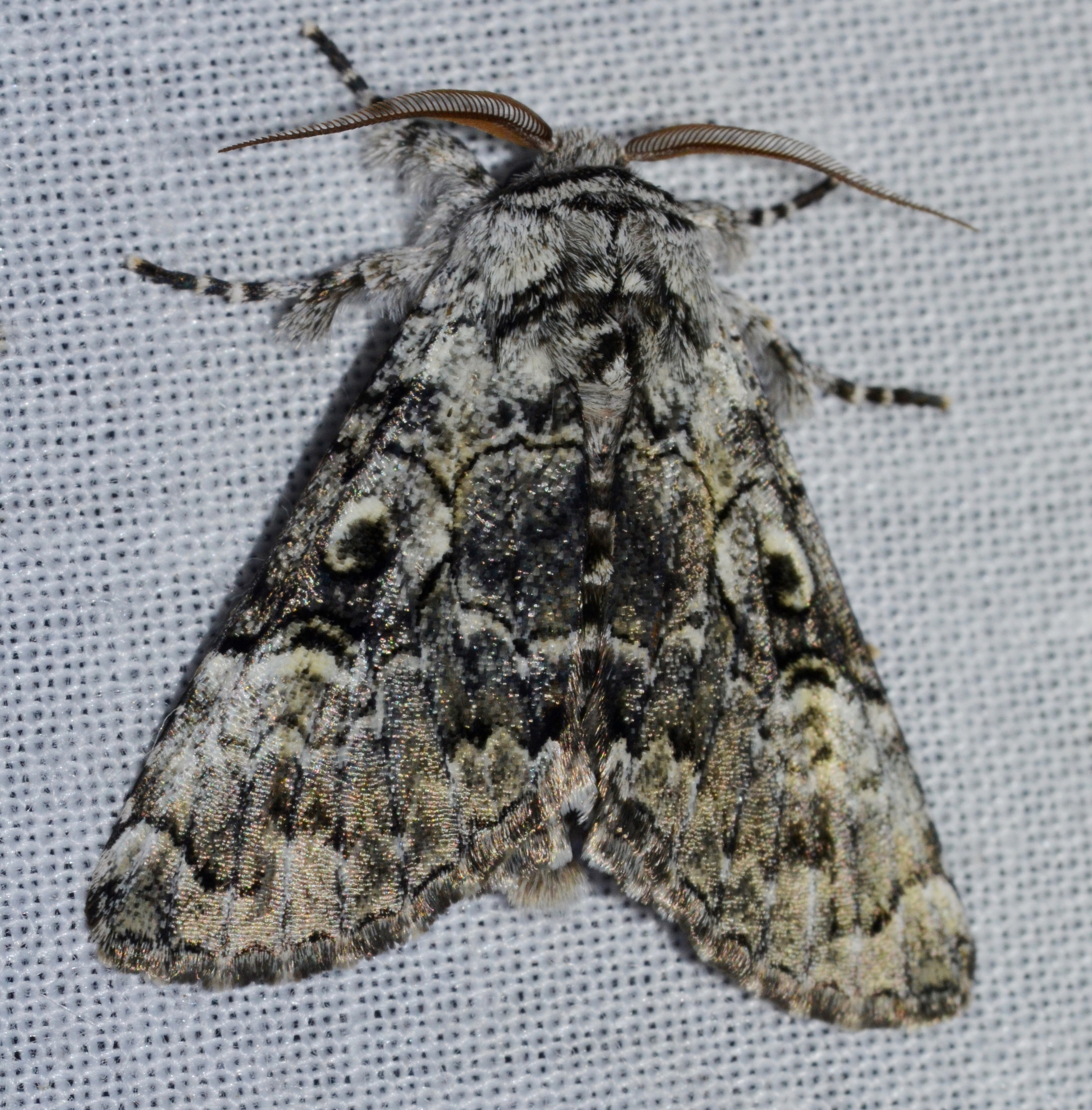

The wingspan is 38–48 mm. Adults are on wing from May to August in the north. They have an extended season in Florida.

The larvae feed on the leaves of beech. Other recorded hosts include birch, elm, maple and oak.
