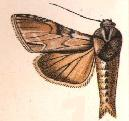

Scientific classification
- Kingdom: Animalia
- Phylum: Arthropoda
- Class: Insecta
- Order: Lepidoptera
- Superfamily: Noctuoidea
- Family: Noctuidae
- Genus: Cucullia
- Species: C. lilacina

Binomial name
- Cucullia lilacina Schaus, 1898

Synonyms
- Cucullia agua Barnes, 1905

= Cucullia lilacina =

Species of moth

Cucullia lilacina is a moth of the family Noctuidae. It is found in Mexico and the south-western United States. In the United States, it is found in the mountains of southern Arizona, reaching as far north as the White Mountains in the east and the Grand Canyon in the west. It is also present in most of New Mexico and in western Texas. In Mexico it has been recorded from the Federal District and Veracruz. A single female is known from Juan Vinas in central Costa Rica.

The wingspan is about 42 mm. Adults are on wing from June to October in the United States.

Larvae have been reared on Erigeron divergens.
