= Sympistis cleopatra =

Scientific classification
- Domain: Eukaryota
- Kingdom: Animalia
- Phylum: Arthropoda
- Class: Insecta
- Order: Lepidoptera
- Superfamily: Noctuoidea
- Family: Noctuidae
- Genus: Sympistis
- Species: S. cleopatra

Binomial name
- Sympistis cleopatra Troubridge, 2008

Species of moth

Sympistis cleopatra is a moth of the family Noctuidae first described by James T. Troubridge in 2008. It is found in Arizona. It known from only one female specimen found on the South Rim of Grand Canyon.

The wingspan is about 35 mm. Adults are on wing in July.
