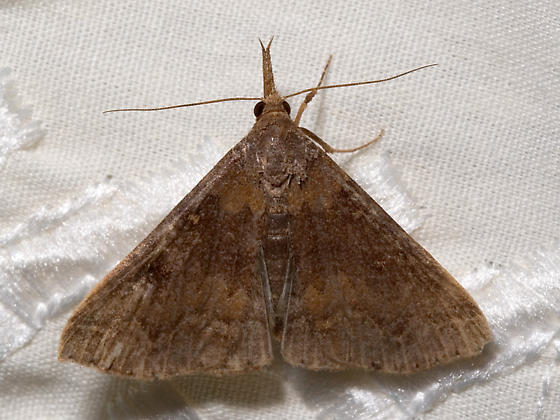

Scientific classification
- Kingdom: Animalia
- Phylum: Arthropoda
- Class: Insecta
- Order: Lepidoptera
- Superfamily: Noctuoidea
- Family: Erebidae
- Genus: Renia
- Species: R. discoloralis

Binomial name
- Renia discoloralis Guenée, 1854

Synonyms
- Renia fallacialis (Walker, 1859); Renia generalis (Walker, 1859); Renia thraxalis (Walker, 1859)

= Renia discoloralis =

Species of moth

Renia discoloralis, the discolored renia, is a litter moth of the family Erebidae. The species was first described by Achille Guenée in 1854. It is found in the United States from Missouri to southern New England, south to at least North Carolina and possibly Florida and Texas, but this might be an unnamed relative.

The wingspan is 35–45 mm. Adults are on wing from July to August. There is one generation per year.

The larvae feed on detritus, including dead leaves.
