= Huachuca Mountains =

Landform in Cochise County, Arizona

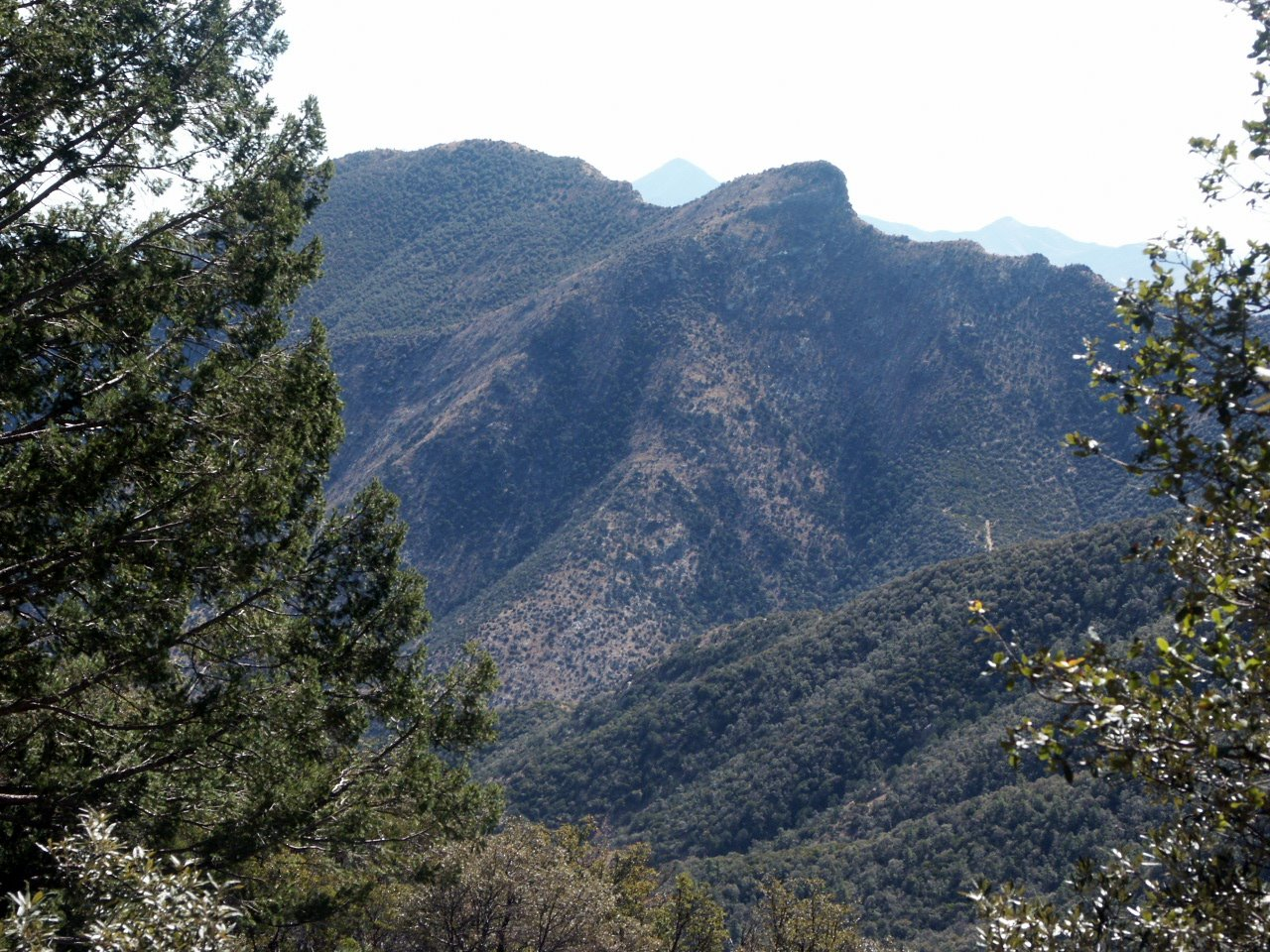
- View from Miller Wilderness area of the Huachuca Mountains

Highest point
- Peak: Miller Peak (Arizona)
- Elevation: 9,466 ft (2,885 m)

Dimensions
- Length: 38 mi (61 km) North to South
- Width: 34 mi (55 km) East to West Extent includes low land hills and valleys
- Area: 755 mi^{2} (1,960 km^{2})

Geography
- Location within Arizona
- Country: United States
- State: Arizona
- Region: Madrean Sky Islands
- District: Cochise County
- Range coordinates: 31°24′N 110°18′W

The Huachuca Mountains are part of the Sierra Vista Ranger District of the Coronado National Forest in Cochise County in southeastern Arizona, approximately 70 miles (110 km) south-southeast of Tucson and southwest of the city of Sierra Vista. Included in this area is the highest peak in the Huachucas, Miller Peak, and the region of the Huachucas known as Canelo Hills in eastern Santa Cruz County. The mountains range in elevation from 3,934 feet (1,199 m) at the base to 9,466 feet (2,885 m) at the top of Miller Peak. The second highest peak in this range is Carr Peak, elevation 9,200 feet (2,804 m). The Huachuca Mountain area is managed principally by the United States Forest Service (Coronado National Forest) (41%) and the U.S. Army (Fort Huachuca) (20%), with much of the rest being private land (32%). Sierra Vista is the main population center (43,888 inhabitants as of the 2010 Census).

The Huachuca Mountains were named by the Spanish for a Pima village that once existed to the north of the range near the present location of Elgin, Arizona. Coronado National Memorial is in the southeastern margin of the range near the Mexico–United States border and includes Montezuma Pass, a possible entry point of Francisco Vázquez de Coronado into what is now Arizona in 1540. The range extends a short distance south of the border in Sonora, Mexico.

== Vegetation ==
Vegetation in the Huachucas varies from Chihuahua whitethorn scrub and semi-desert mixed grass/mixed scrub, at the lower elevations, to Encinal mixed oak, and transitions to ponderosa pine and Apache pine at the highest elevations.

== Climate data ==
- Average precipitation: 20" on peaks; 15" at base
- Average high/low winter temperatures (°F): 35/20 on peaks; 60/35 at base
- Average high/low summer temperatures (°F): 75/50 on peaks; 95/65 at base

== Recreation ==
=== Hiking ===
The Huachucas present many hiking possibilities and scenic drives. Some entail narrow dirt roads with switchbacks and pull-outs. High summits, sheer cliffs, and deep canyons distinguish this rugged area of 20,190 acres (81.7 km^{2}). Trails climb from all sides of the range to the Miller Peak Wilderness. Along the trails there are opportunities to see a number of rare butterflies of Arizona (see List of butterflies and moths of Arizona), as well as plants that are more commonly found in the Sierra Madre Occidental. Trails begin on the east side of Ash Canyon, Miller Canyon, Carr Canyon, and Ramsey Canyon roads, from the south at Montezuma Pass in the Coronado National Memorial, and from the west via Oversite trail, Ida, Bear, and Sunnyside canyons. The 11.5-mile (18.5 km) Crest Trail between Montezuma Pass and Fort Huachuca ties all of the trails together. There are some 50 trails altogether. Trail users may encounter immigrants on the mountain trails; no negative incidents have ever been reported by Arizona Trail Association users. The mountains include the type locality for a number of plant species collected by the Lemmons and named by Asa Gray.

=== Birdwatching ===
This area is appreciated for its birdwatching opportunities including some Arizona specialties such as hummingbirds, trogons, and tyrant flycatchers, including some rare birds such as the blue-throated, white-eared, and berylline hummingbirds; also buff-breasted flycatchers; and black-throated gray, red-faced, and Grace's warblers; also red crossbills and numerous other bird species.

== Border wall ==
The mountain ecosystem is threatened by both the influx of litter from immigrants and the border barrier being constructed by the administration of Arizona Governor Doug Ducey. Despite lack of authorization from federal authorities, Ducey is constructing a wall of shipping containers along the border on land owned by the United States Forest Service in Coronado National Forest. Ecologists argue that this construction threatened endangered species such as jaguars and ocelots, and therefore violates federal laws such as the Endangered Species Act. For that reason the Center for Biological Diversity has sued to halt construction.

Construction is expected to stop when governor-elect Katie Hobbs takes office. Hobbs has stated intention to remove the containers after taking office.

== Gallery ==
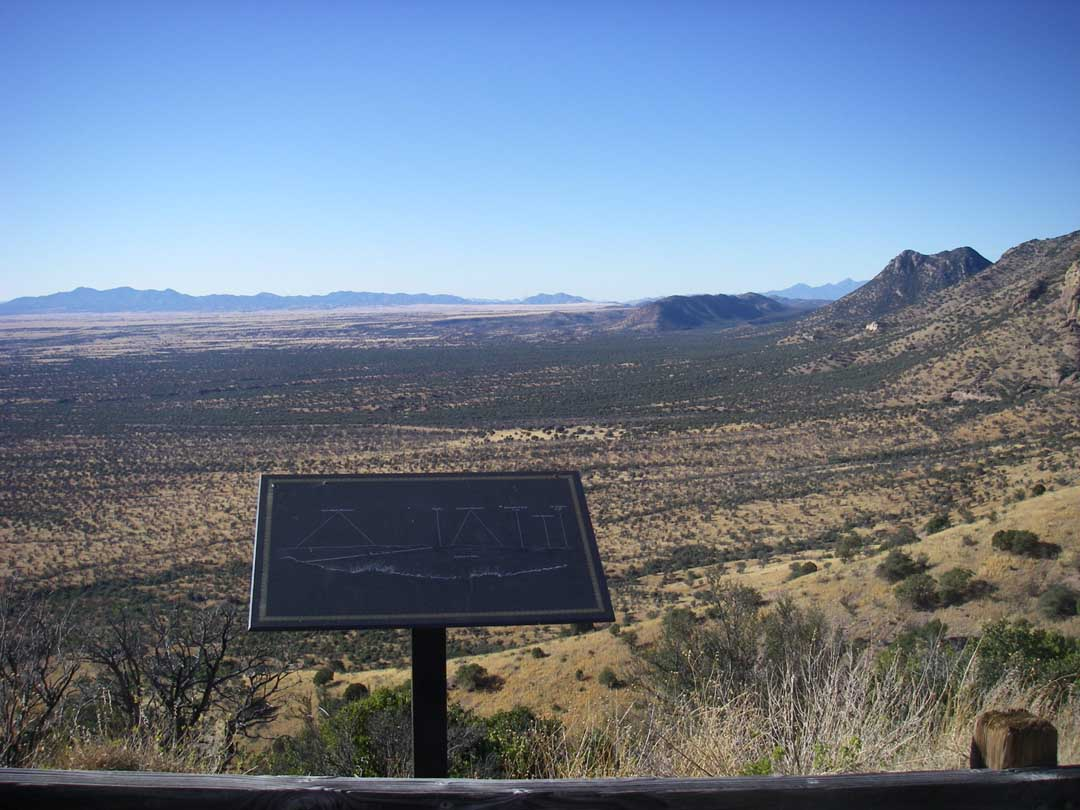
View from Montezuma Pass looking south & west into Mexico

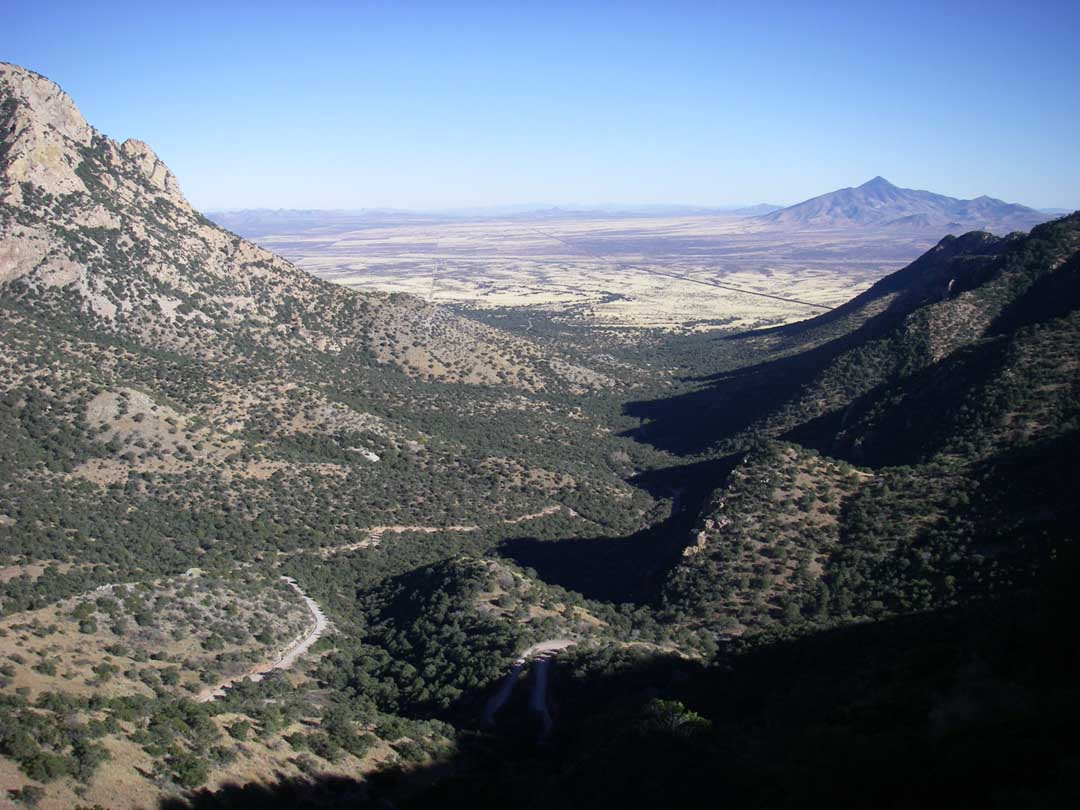
View from Montezuma Pass looking east

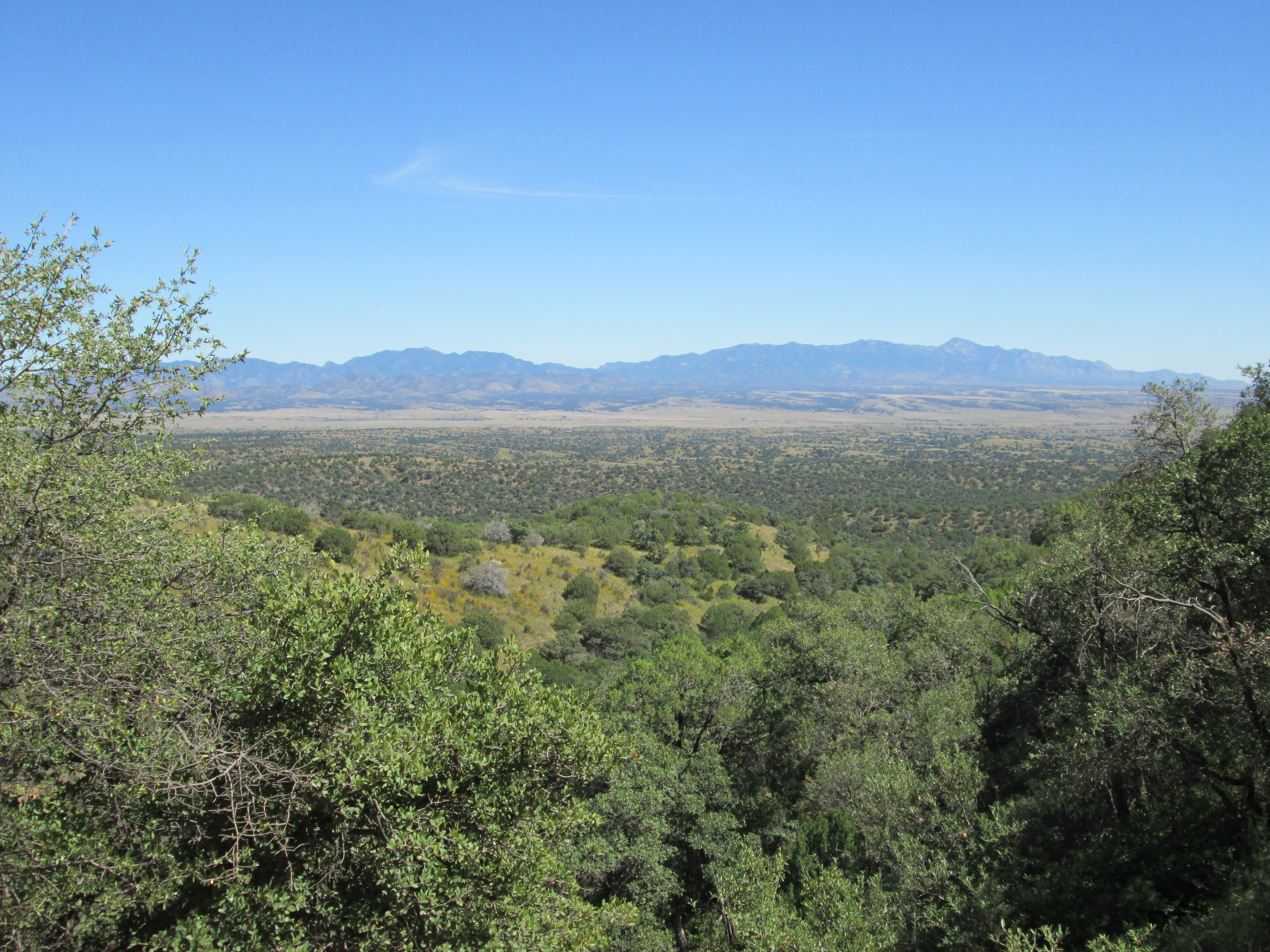
The Huachuca Mountains, as seen from across San Rafael Valley in the Patagonia Mountains

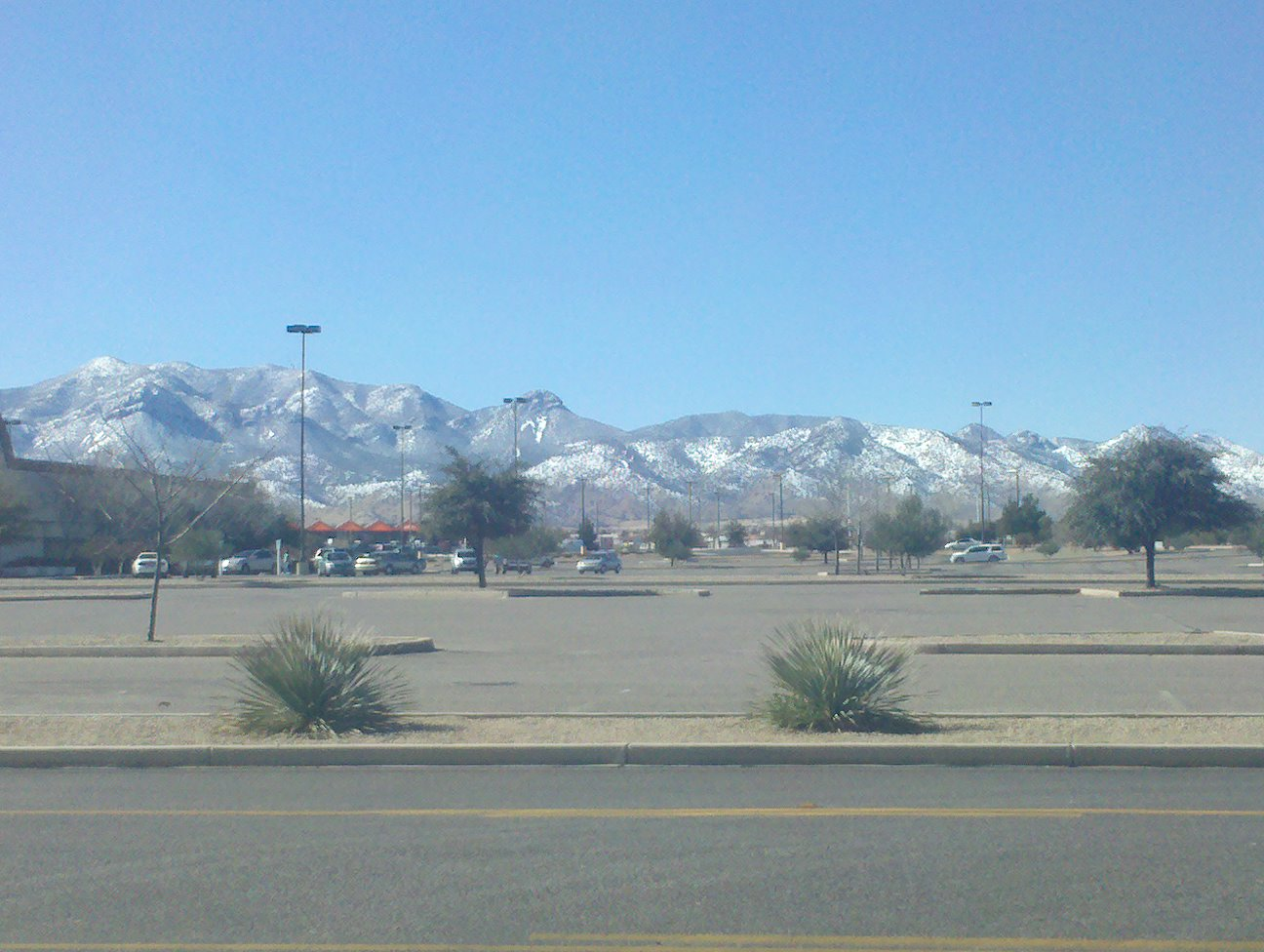
Northern portion of the Huachuca Mountains in the winter

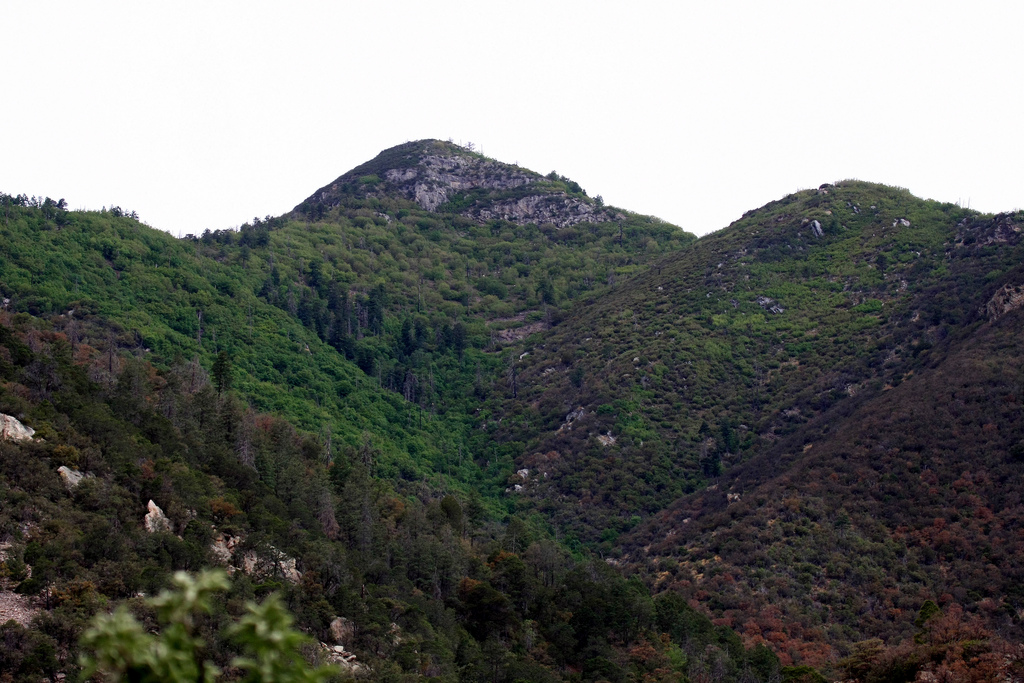
Miller Canyon

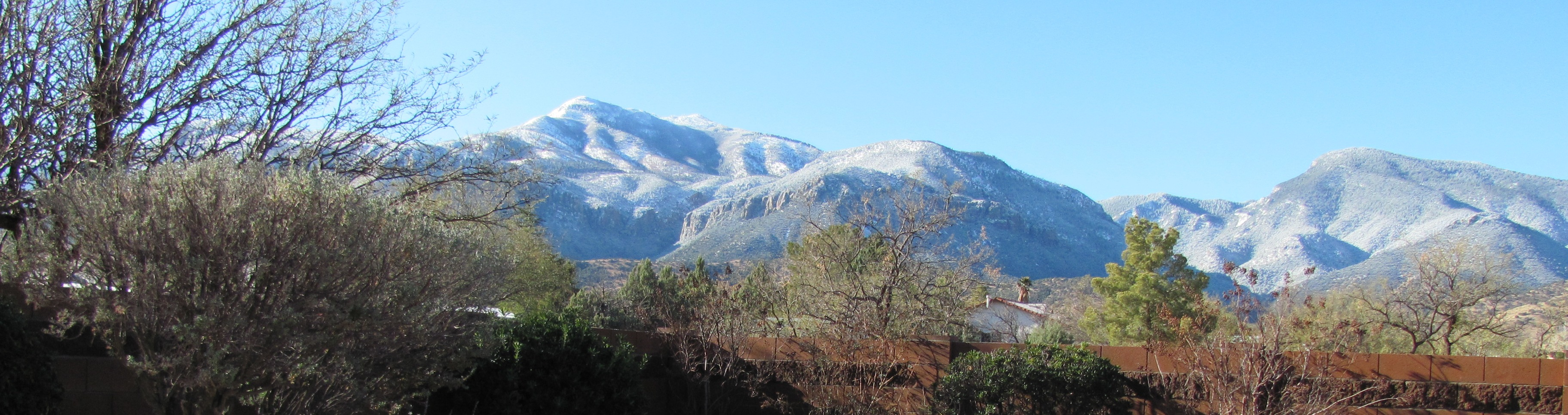
View of Carr Peak (middle left) and Ramsey Peak (right) in the Huachuca Mountains

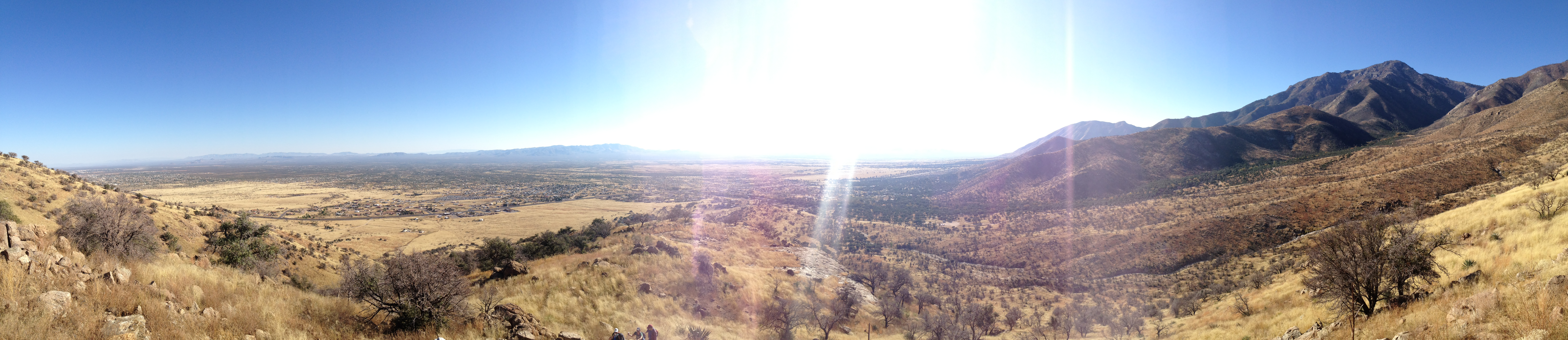
View of Hereford from inside of Miller Canyon
