= 8th Cavalry Regiment =

United States Army Cavalry Regiment

- 8th Cavalry Regiment coat of arms
- Active: 1866–present
- Country: United States
- Branch: United States Army
- Type: Cavalry
- Mottos: Honor and Courage
- Colors: Red
- Engagements: Indian Wars; Spanish–American War; Pancho Villa Expedition; World War II; Korean War; Vietnam War; Iraq Campaign

Commanders
- Notable commanders: John Irvin Gregg; Harold Keith Johnson; Robert B. Abrams

Insignia
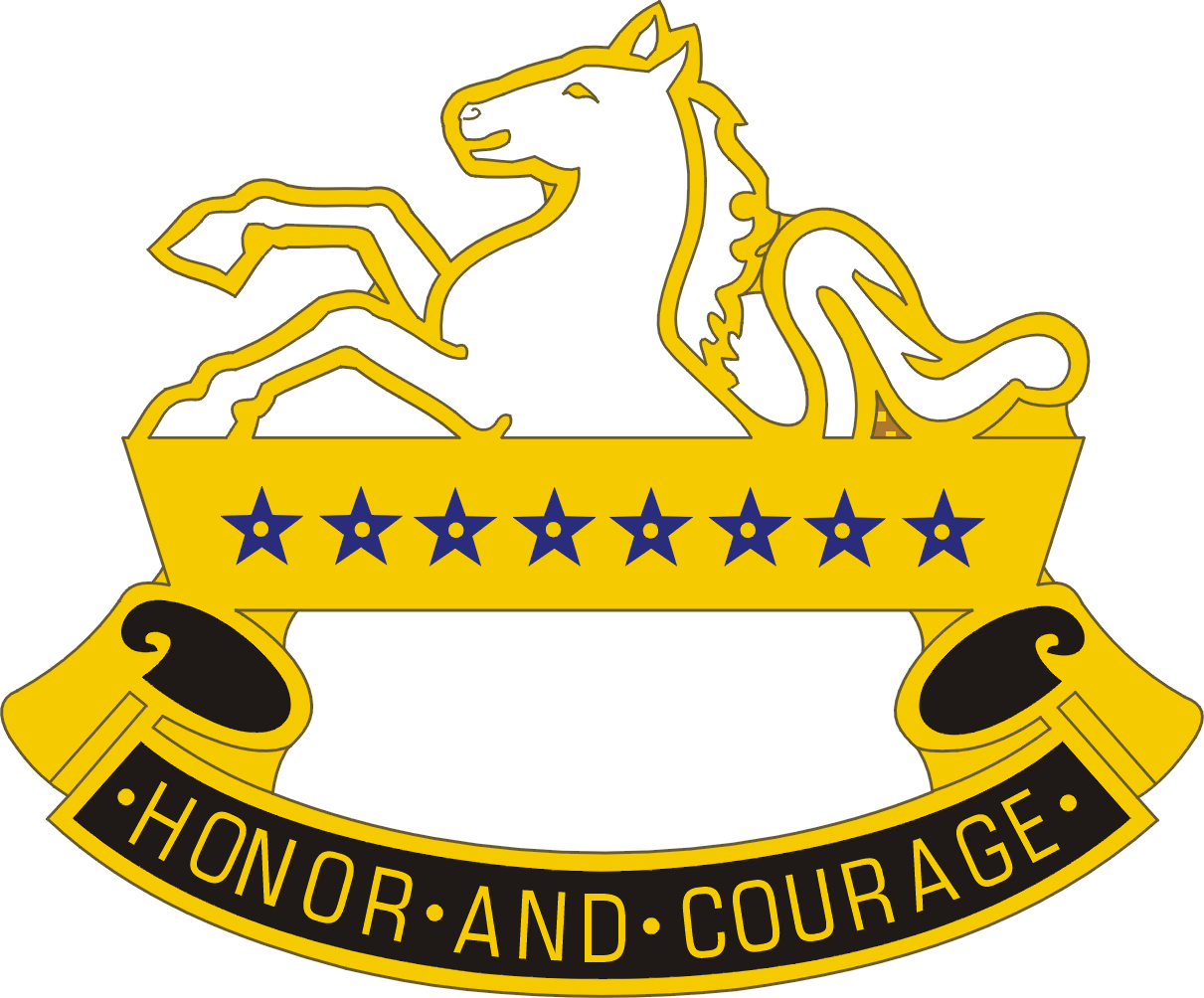
- Regimental distinctive insignia

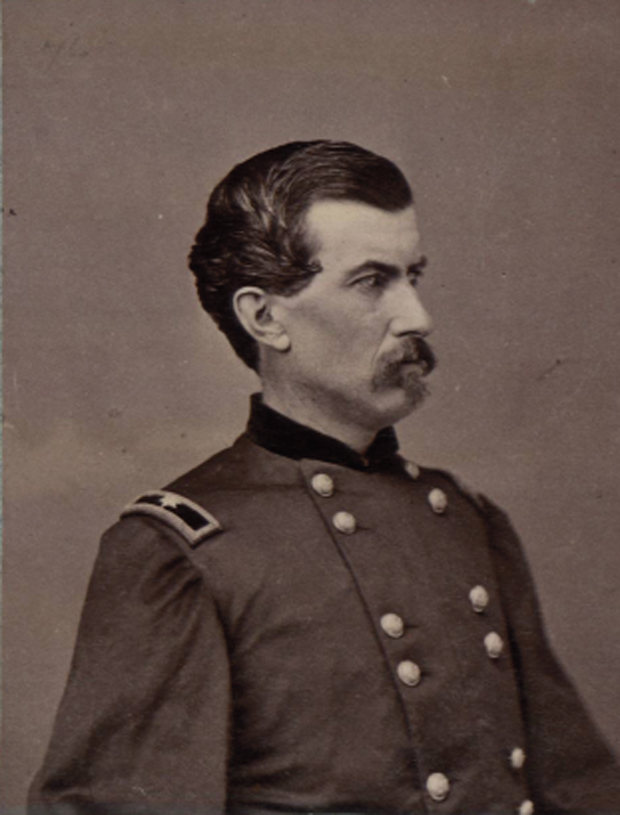
Brevet Major James Monroe Williams Company I 8th U.S. Cavalry 1866–1873

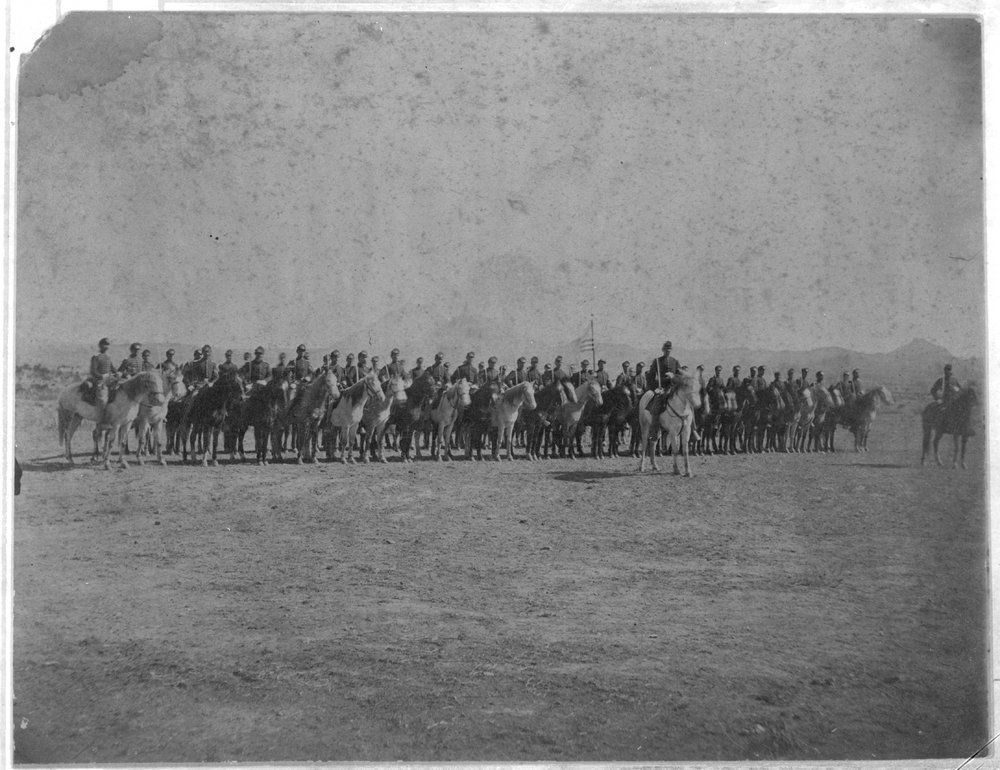
8th U.S. Cavalry in New Mexico, c. 1870

The 8th Cavalry Regiment is a regiment of the United States Army formed in 1866 during the American Indian Wars. The 8th Cavalry continued to serve under a number of designations, fighting in every other major U.S. conflict since, except World War I, when it was not deployed to Europe because it was already engaged in the Punitive Expedition in Mexico from 1916 to 1920. The "8th" is a component of the 1st Cavalry Division.

== History ==
The regiment originally was organized as horse cavalry in 1866 – a designation under U.S. military doctrine that emphasized both light cavalry and dragoon-type mounted and dismounted fighting roles – until 1942. It served on foot during World War II and Korea, with some elements converting to airmobile infantry for Vietnam, while others were detached and assigned to West Germany as part of an armored task force to resist any potential Soviet incursion. It became a mechanized force in the 1970s. It has been brigaded or otherwise attached to various larger temporary and permanent Army commands throughout its history. Currently, it is a component of the 1st Cavalry Division, a major subordinate command of the U.S. Third Mobile Armored Corps comprising a 19,000 soldier, heavy armored division stationed at Ft. Cavazos (Hood), Texas. As one of the two "on-call" heavy contingency force divisions of the Army, the First Team has an on-order mission to deploy by sea, air or land to any part of the world on a short notice.

=== Indian Wars (1866–90) ===
The 8th Cavalry Regiment was constituted 28 July 1866 and was organized as a regiment on 21 September 1866 at Camp Reynolds, Angel Island, California. The enlisted soldiers were "composed chiefly of men enlisted on the Pacific Coast, and included many of the class styled 'Forty-niners'; men who had worked months or years in the mines and were typical specimens of the roving order of citizens. Many of them were wild characters who enlisted in the same spirit of adventure which led them to the frontier, and typically had difficulty in adapting themselves to the conformity of a military life." Many desertions followed, the number reaching 41% by the end of 1867. The officers assigned to the regiment were all veterans of the Civil War. John Irvin Gregg was its first colonel, with Thomas Devin as lieutenant colonel; both had been generals of volunteers and commanded cavalry divisions during the war. The Eighth Cavalry would serve on the frontier throughout the late 19th century.

The 8th was actively engaged in trying to control various Native American tribes and bands in Nevada, Oregon, Arizona, New Mexico and Texas in the Indian Wars between 1867 and 1888. Two years after the capture of Geronimo, they were transferred to South Dakota, Montana and North Dakota where they participated in several actions.

From December 1866 companies of the 8th Cavalry were involved in the Snake War, replacing California and Oregon Volunteer companies that had been fighting the Snakes in Nevada and Oregon during the American Civil War. Many of the 8th's soldiers were experienced frontier soldiers that had been serving with California Volunteer units fighting Indians (including the Snakes) during the Civil War and had reenlisted with the U.S. Army following the disbanding of their Volunteer units. From December 1867 to January 1868, the headquarters was moved from Camp Whipple, AZ, to Churchill Barracks, NV. In May, headquarters was moved to Camp Halleck, Nevada, where it remained till 5 May 1870, when it was again moved to Fort Union, New Mexico. During this time Company L engaged in an action in Hell Canyon, Arizona, for which Corporal John James Mitchell received the Medal of Honor. The several troops took stations at Fort Union, Fort Craig, Fort Selden, Fort Wingate, Fort Bascom, and Fort Stanton, in New Mexico, and Fort Garland, in the Colorado Territory. The duties during this period were of almost continuous field service by troops or detachments, scouting for Apaches and Navajo, furnishing guards and escorts.

During active combat against the Chiricahua Apaches headed by Cochise, during a battle at Rocky Mesa in the Chiricahua Mountains on 20 October 1869, the following were awarded the Medal of Honor for gallantry in an engagement against a group of Apache warriors subsequent to attacks by this group on a stagecoach and a crew of cowboys:

- First Sergeant Francis Oliver, Company G
- Sergeant Frederick Jarvis, Company G
- Sergeant Andrew J. Smith, Company G
- Sergeant John Thompson, Company G
- Corporal John Guenther aka Gunther of the 8th Cavalry also was awarded the Medal of Honor and is buried in the Santa Fe National Cemetery.
- Corporal Thomas Powers, Company G
- Private Edwin L. Elwood, Company G
- Private Charles Kelley, Company G
- Private Edward Murphy, Company G
- Private James Russell, Company G
- Private Charles Schroeter, Company G
- Private William Smith, Company G
- Private William H. Smith, Company G
- Private Thomas Sullivan, Company G
- Private James Sumner, Company G
- Private John Tracy, Company G
- Saddler Christian Steiner, Company G
- Wagoner Griffin Seward, Company G

From October 1870 to July 1874, Troops "C", "G", "I" and "K" of the 8th Cavalry were stationed at Fort Selden, New Mexico, a territorial fort established on the Rio Grande at the present site of Radium Springs, New Mexico. Their primary mission was to protect the settlers and travelers of the Mesilla Valley and San Augustin Pass from the Mescalero Apaches and other bands. The location of the fort was an ancient Indian campground and a crossing point for Spanish caravans headed across the Jornada del Muerto ("Journey of Death"). In conjunction with the encampment at Fort Selden, Regimental Headquarters and three companies of the 8th Cavalry were assigned to Fort Union, New Mexico, under the command of Major William Redwood Price. A campaign was organized to enter the Llano Estacado, the Staked Plains area of the Texas Panhandle, a favorite haunt of bands of Comanches and Kiowas. Departing into the field in August 1874, the 8th Cavalry campaigned into the early months of 1875 before the Southern Plains were finally considered free of the Indian threat and Fort Union settled into a period of reservation watching, holding its troops in readiness for future troubles. The regiment remained in New Mexico performing the same duties until July, 1875, when it marched to Texas. On 31 December 1875 soldiers of the regiment were engaged in a brawl with members of the John Kinney Gang in a Las Cruces, New Mexico saloon in which two died and three were injured The 8th periodically was engaged in the Apache Wars in southern New Mexico; in November–December 1877 Alsate's Mescaleros clashed twice with 8th Cavalry troops: on 30 November, companies A and K, respectively led by capt. A.B. Wells with lt. F.E. Phelps, and by capt. S.B. Young with lt. John L. Bullis, trespassed the Rio Grande border running after Alsate's band in the Sierra Madera del Carmen, Mexico, killing or wounding some Apaches, destroying the camp and catching some horses, donkeys and mules; on 4 December, capt. Young, with troop K, and lt. Bullis, with a detachment of [negro-]Seminole scouts, after chasing the Chisos for several weeks, attacked the Apache group led by Alsate and his sub-chiefs Zorrillo (Chisos Limpia Mescaleros) and Colorado (probably the chief of a smaller Lipan band joint to the Chisos Mescaleros, and likely to be identified with Avispa Colorada, connected to Alsate and Carnoviste in 1874); Alsate led his people to Chihuahua. On 19 December 1885 an officer and 4 enlisted men were killed by Apaches near Alma, New Mexico.

In May 1888, the regiment prepared for the longest march ever taken by a cavalry regiment. With the increased number of settlers moving to the Northwest United States, the regiment was ordered to march more than 2,600 miles (4,200 km) to its new regimental headquarters located at Fort Meade, South Dakota and station at Fort Keogh, Montana. Some of its march was along the famous Santa Fe Trail in New Mexico, near which carvings on large boulders and trees still gives mute testimony of the troops on the longest of all trails.

=== Spanish–American War ===
At the outbreak of the Spanish–American War in 1898, the 8th Regimental Headquarters and six troops went by rail to Camp A. G. Forse, Alabama and sailed on USAT Logan from Savannah, Georgia, for the island of Cuba for a four-year tour of duty to secure the peace. Their duties were varied and included protection of American citizens and their property.

=== 1905–42 ===
In 1905, the regiment was ordered to the Philippines with the assignment of suppressing the anti-colonial Moro Rebellion. In addition, they patrolled supply and communications lines and sources of water on the islands of Luzon and Jolo. The Regiment returned to the United States briefly in 1907, but in 1910, the 8th Cavalry Regiment returned to the Philippines for their second tour of Pacific duty. This time, the regiment once again fought against Moro rebels on the Filipino island of Mindanao and in the Sulu Archipelago. In the Battle of Bud Bagsak in June 1913, a total of 51 members of the 8th Cavalry's Troop "H" joined other U.S. Army soldiers in a violent battle with hundreds of Moro warriors on Jolo.

In September 1914, the regiment was stationed at Camp Stotsenburg, Philippine Islands and performed the usual garrison duties. On 21 September, it joined with the 7th Cavalry Regiment to form a provisional cavalry brigade.

Returning to the United States on 12 September 1915, the regiment was stationed at Fort Bliss, Texas, as part of the 15th Cavalry Division. Troops were dispatched along the border for the purpose of subduing the activity of Mexican bandits who were giving the ranchers a great deal of trouble. Responding to a border raid at Columbus, New Mexico, by Pancho Villa, an expedition led by John J. Pershing was launched into Mexico on 15 March 1916. First Lieutenant George Smith Patton, Jr. was one of Pershing's aides-de-camp. On 31 July 1916 a U.S. Customs officer and a private were killed and a sergeant wounded in a clash between the 8th Cavalry and Mexican bandits of whom five were killed.

On January 28, 1918, Troop G of the 8th Cavalry Regiment, along with Company B of the Texas Rangers and white ranchers perpetrated the Porvenir massacre, in which 15 Mexican-American men and boys were killed.

"On April 7, 1918; there was a skirmish with Mexican bandits. In Commanding at Fort Hancock during this time from Dec 2, 1917 to May 10, 1918, was Capt. Thomas Henry Rees, Jr."

On 13 September 1921, with the initiation of the National Defense Act, the 1st Cavalry Division was formally activated at Fort Bliss, Texas. The first unit of the 1st Cavalry Division, the 1st Cavalry Regiment, had been preassigned to the 1st Division on 20 August 1921, nearly a month before the formal divisional activation date. Upon formal activation, the 7th, 8th, and 10th Cavalry Regiments were assigned to the new division. It served as a horse cavalry regiment until 1942, when it took part in amphibious training.

=== World War II ===
After the U.S. entered World War II, the regiment arrived in Australia in 1943 and started an intense period of jungle warfare training to prepare it for combat. Following the invasion of Los Negros, the 8th Regiment departed from New Guinea as the part of the reinforcements for the Admiralty Campaign. On 9 March 1944, they landed at Salami Beach, Los Negros Island.

The Manus Island invasion commenced at dawn 15 March, with heavy shelling, naval bombardment and air attacks. Soon afterward, the 2nd Brigade, under the command of Brigadier General Verne D. Mudge, surprised the enemy by landing at two beaches near the Lugos Mission Plantation. By dusk the 1st Squadron of the 8th Cavalry regiment had advanced past snipers and scattered resistance and dug in on the western edge of Lorengau Airdrome, the last airfield controlled by the Japanese. 16 March saw very heavy fighting as troopers charged or crawled through heavy machine gun fire to wipe out the Japanese positions. Lorengau Airdrome was captured the next day, after the 7th Cavalry moved up to relieve the weary 8th Cavalry fighters.

On 18 March, the 2nd Brigade crossed the river in force and drove the enemy from Lorengau Village. The objectives were Rossum, a small village south of Lorengau and Salsia Plantation. By 21 March, the 8th Cavalry had won control of most of the plantation, but the battle for Rossum was slowed by heavy jungle which the Japanese used to their advantage. After 96 hours of bitter combat the 1st Squadron, 7th Cavalry was relieved by the 1st Squadron, 8th Cavalry. The final push to Rossum was made behind heavy artillery fire and air bombardment. On 28 March, the battle for Los Negros and Manus was over, except for mopping up operations. The Admiralty Islands campaign officially ended on 18 May 1944. Japanese casualties were 3,317 killed.

On 20 October, the regiment participated in the Leyte invasion, Operation King II. Held in corps reserve, the 8th Cavalry Regiment moved into the fighting on 23 October. The 1st Squadron, 8th Cavalry drove up a highway leading northwest of Tacloban and the 2nd Squadron advanced along the southern shore of the Sab Jaunico Strait which sealed off the route and opened the way for the invasion of Samar on 24 October. On Samar, on 5 December, the regiment was ordered to seize the town of Wright, and establish control over the southwestern portion of the island. Hinabangan fell on 7 December. The troopers fought their way into Wright on 13 December, and by 21 December, the towns of Catbalogan and Taft fell and the Campaign of Samar came to an end.

On 3 February 1945, elements of the 1st Cavalry Division pushed into the northern outskirts of Manila, with only the steep-sided Tuliahan River separating them from the city proper. A squadron of the 8th Cavalry reached the bridge just moments after Japanese soldiers had finished preparing it for demolition. As the two sides opened fire on one another, the Japanese lit the fuse leading to the carefully placed explosives. Without hesitation, Lt. James P. Sutton, a Navy demolitions expert attached to the division, dashed through the enemy fire and cut the burning fuse. At 18:35, the column crossed the city limits of Manila. Troop "F" of the 8th Cavalry, under the command of Captain Emery M. Hickman, swept through the heavy Japanese sniper fire to the White House of the Philippines in time to take control of Malacañang Palace and save it from the torches of the Japanese. As the gates were opened, cheering Filipinos emerged and helped the cavalrymen set up a defense perimeter around the palace grounds.

After the surrender of the Japanese, the 1st Division was given responsibility for occupying the entire city of Tokyo and the adjacent parts of Tokyo and Saitama Prefectures. The command posts of the 1st Brigade, 5th Cavalry and 12th Cavalry were situated at Camp McGill at Otawa, approximately 20 miles (32 km) south of Yokohama. The 2nd Brigade maintained its command post at the Imperial Guard Headquarters Buildings in Tokyo, while the 7th Cavalry was situated at the Merchant Marine School. The 8th Cavalry occupied the 3rd Imperial Guard Regiment Barracks in Tokyo, which provided greater proximity to security missions at the American and Russian Embassies and the Imperial Palace grounds. Division Headquarters and other units were stationed at Camp Drake near Tokyo.

=== Korean War ===
The regiment saw vicious fighting during the Korean War, with five of its members earning the Medal of Honor: Tibor Rubin (23 July 1950 to 20 April 1953), Fr. Emil J Kapaun (1–2 November 1950), Samuel S. Coursen (12 December 1950), Robert M. McGovern (30 January 1951), and Lloyd L. Burke (28 October 1951).

Initially scheduled to make an amphibious landing at Inchon, it was redirected to the southeastern coast of Korea at Pohang a port 80 miles (130 km) north of Pusan on 30 June 1950. The Korean People's Army (KPA) were 25 miles (40 km) away when elements of the 1st Cavalry Division swept ashore to successfully carry out the first amphibious landing of the Korean War. The 8th Cavalry Regiment, reinforced by division artillery and other units, moved by rail, truck and jeep to relieve the 21st Regiment, 24th Division near Yongdong. By 22 July, all regiments were deployed in battle positions in the face of Typhoon Helene that pounded the Korean coastline.

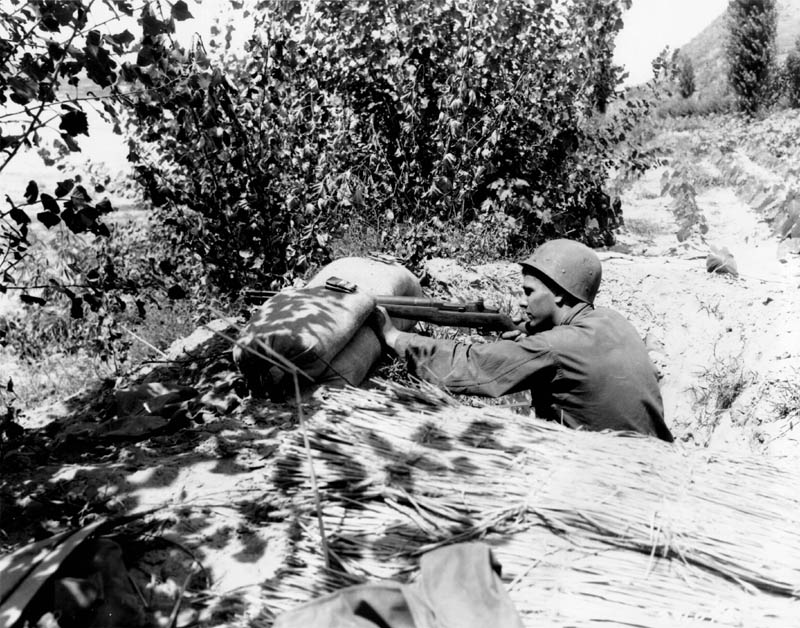
Pfc. Letcher V. Gardner (Montgomery, Iowa) 8th Cavalry, fires on an emplacement along the Naktong River, near Chingu. 13 August 1950.

Thousands of Chinese People's Volunteer Army (PVA) forces attacked from the north, northwest, and west against scattered U.S. and Republic of Korea Army (ROK) units moving deep into North Korea. At 19:30 on 1 November 1950 the Chinese attacked the 1st Battalion, 8th Cavalry, all along its line. At 21:00 PVA troops found the weak link in the ridgeline and began moving through it and down the ridge behind the 2d Battalion, penetrating its right flank and encircling its left. Now both the 1st and 2d Battalions were engaged by the enemy on several sides. Around midnight the 8th Cavalry received orders to withdraw southward to Ipsok.

As of 01:30 on 2 November there were no reports of enemy activity in the 3d Battalion's sector south of Unsan. But as the 8th Cavalry withdrew, all three battalions became trapped by PVA roadblocks south of Unsan during the early morning hours. Within hours the ROK 15th Regiment on the 8th Cavalry's right flank collapsed, while the 1st and 2d Battalions of the 8th Cavalry fell back in disarray into the city of Unsan. By morning, with their positions being overrun and their guns falling silent, the men of the 8th Cavalry tried to withdraw, but a PVA roadblock to their rear forced them to abandon their artillery, and the men took to the hills in small groups. Only a few scattered survivors made it back. Members of the 1st Battalion who were able to escape reached the Ipsok area. A head count showed that the battalion had lost about 15 officers and 250 enlisted men. Members of the 2d Battalion, for the most part, scattered into the hills. Many of them reached the ROK lines near Ipsok. Others met up with the 3d Battalion, the hardest hit. Around 03:00 the Chinese launched a surprise attack on the battalion command post. Hand-to-hand fighting ensued for about half an hour before the enemy was driven from the area. The disorganized members of the 3d Battalion formed a core of resistance around three tanks on the valley floor and held off the enemy until daylight. By that time only 6 officers and 200 enlisted men were still able to function. More than 170 were wounded, and there was no account of the number dead or missing.

The remaining battalion of the 8th Cavalry, the 3d, was hit early in the morning of 2 November with the same "human wave" assaults of bugle-blowing Chinese. In the confusion, one company-size Chinese element was mistaken for South Koreans and allowed to pass a critical bridge near the battalion command post (CP). Once over the bridge, the enemy commander blew his bugle, and the Chinese, throwing satchel charges and grenades, overran the CP.

Elements of the two other regiments of the 1st Cavalry Division, the 5th Cavalry Regiment and 7th Cavalry Regiment, tried unsuccessfully to reach the isolated battalion. The 5th Cavalry, commanded by then Lt. Col. Harold K. Johnson, later to be Chief of Staff of the Army, led a two-battalion counterattack on the dug-in Chinese positions encircling the 8th Cavalry. However, with insufficient artillery support and a determined enemy, he and his men were unable to break the Chinese line. With daylight fading, the relief effort was broken off and the men of the 8th Cavalry were ordered to get out of the trap any way they could. Breaking into small elements, the soldiers moved out overland under cover of darkness. Most did not make it.

On 6 November, the 3rd Battalion, 8th Cavalry Regiment ceased to exist as a unit. In all, over eight hundred men of the 8th Cavalry were lost—almost one-third of the regiment's strength—in the initial attacks by massive Chinese forces, forces that only recently had been considered as existing only in rumor.

The enemy force that destroyed the 8th Cavalry at Unsan was the CCF's 116th Division. Elements of the 116th's 347th Regiment were responsible for the roadblock south of Unsan. Also engaged in the Unsan action was the PVA's 115th Division.

On 25 January 1951, the 1st Cavalry Division, joined by the revitalized 3rd Battalion, 8th Cavalry moved back into action. The movement began as a reconnaissance in force to locate and assess the size of the PVA forces, believed to be at least 174,000. The Eighth Army moved slowly and methodically, ridge by ridge, phase line by phase line, wiping out each pocket of resistance before moving farther north. The advance covered 2 miles (3.2 km) a day, despite heavy blinding snowstorms and subzero temperatures. On 14 March, the 3rd Battalion, 8th Cavalry had crossed the Hangchon River and on the 15th, Seoul was recaptured by elements of the 8th Army. New objectives were established to keep the Chinese from rebuilding and resupplying their forces and to advance to the "Kansas Line", which roughly followed the 38th Parallel and the winding Imjin River. On 3 October, the 1st Cavalry Division moved out from Line Wyoming and immediately into Chinese fire. For the next two days; hills were taken, lost and retaken. On the third day, the Chinese lines began to break in front of the 7th Cavalry. On 5 October, the 8th Cavalry recaptured Hill 418, a flanking hill on which the northern end of Line Jamestown was anchored. On 10–11 October, the Chinese counter-attacked; twice, unsuccessfully against the 7th Cavalry. Two days later, the 8th Cavalry took the central pivot of the line, Hill 272. The southern end of Line Jamestown, along with a hill called "Old Baldy", eventually fell to the 8th Cavalry troopers.

By December 1951, the division, after 549 days of continuous fighting, began rotation back to Hokkaidō, Japan. The final echelon of the 1st Cavalry Division, the 8th Cavalry Regiment, left for Japan on 30 December.

After the Korean War the 8th Cavalry remained in the Far East on duty in Japan and guarding the Demilitarized Zone (DMZ) between North and South Korea.

On July 31, 2018, 55 boxes of MIA remains were returned from North Korea; the only military dogtag with the remains was that of 8th Cavalry medic MSgt Charles McDaniel casualty of 2 November 1950

=== Cold War and Vietnam War ===
During the reorganization of the Army in the late 1950s, the regimental headquarters was disbanded and the 1st Squadron transitioned into the 1st Battle Group and then the 1st Mechanized Battalion, 8th Cavalry. Reassigned to Fort Benning, Georgia, in 1965, the battalion was reorganized as an airborne and airmobile unit and immediately deployed to the Republic of Vietnam as the 1st Battalion (Airborne), 8th Cavalry, the "Jumping Mustangs". Additionally, F Troop, 8th Cavalry served as a recon element for the 196th Infantry Brigade. 3rd Squadron, 8th Cavalry served as the divisional cavalry reconnaissance squadron (administratively under the 3rd Brigade), 8th Infantry Division at Coleman Barracks in Sandhofen, Germany.

Later, 3–8th and the 4–8th Cavalry were the heavy armor units of the 2nd Brigade, 3rd Armored Division in Gelnhausen, West Germany as a part of the defense of the Fulda Gap. 4–8th Cavalry was the first U.S. unit to win the Canadian Army Trophy (CAT). The 3–8 and 4–8 Cav. were on border guard in the Fulda Gap on 3 October 1990 during German Reunification when the Cold War came to an end.

In 1965, 1st Battalion (ABN), 8th Cavalry Regiment arrived in Vietnam, and participated in numerous campaigns in South Vietnam and Cambodia. The battalion was awarded two Presidential Unit Citations, the Valorous Unit Citation, and four soldiers were awarded with the nation's highest honor, the Medal of Honor.

Bravo Company 1/8th (1 January 1968 – 31 December 1968). With the close of Operation Pershing and the beginning of the new year, 1st Battalion, 8th Cavalry, as part of the 1st Brigade, 1st Air Cavalry Division, was to begin a series of operations for the year 1968. These operations were to include Jeb Stuart II, Delaware, Jeb Stuart III, Comanche Falls, Toan Thang II and Navajo Horse. Departing LZ English utilizing 17 sorties of C-130s and land-sea transportation, the "Jumping Mustangs" closed in full force at their destination LZ Betty, in Binh Thuan Province on 30 January 1968 to begin Operation Jeb Stuart II. On 16–17 February 1968 they made their first major contact with the enemy. Company B engaged in heavy fighting with the People's Army of Vietnam (PAVN) 883rd Regiment and the 324B Division in the vicinity of Quảng Trị. Receiving only light casualties, the men of the 1st Battalion, 8th Cavalry accounted for 29 PAVN killed, 4 AK-47s, 3 SKS rifles and 1 RPG destroyed. For the remainder of February and part of March the 1st Battalion, 8th Cavalry conducted search and clear missions which accounted for 10,000 pounds of rice, 8 PAVN killed, 6 small arms weapons, 5 B40 rockets, 19 grenades, and 150 small arms rounds.

On 9 March Bravo Company came under intense mortar attack at the beach that resulted in 3 dead. On 25 March 1968 Company A air-assaulted into two separate LZs north and south of Thon Xuan Duong hamlets. Upon landing the men met with heavy resistance however within fifteen minutes, the 3rd Platoon reported sporadic fire being received and 2nd and 4th platoons reported receiving heavy fire from all directions. Company D was immediately airlifted to join Company A. Company C, operating in the area earlier, moved by foot to provide blocking force. Both Companies A and D coordinated two assaults with the help of aerial rocket artillery (ARA) and ground artillery. Both attempts failed because of heavy enemy fire. During the night the enemy broke contact. A search of the area the next morning revealed 66 PAVN dead, 6 POWs, 6 small arms captured 1 RPG captured.

5 April, marked the beginning of Operation Pegasus; the battalion and other 1st Cavalry elements came to the relief of the Marines at beleaguered Khe Sanh Combat Base. After successful operations, the battalion moved on to their biggest operation for the year. On 23 April 1968 1st Battalion, 8th Cavalry began Operation Delaware in which it air-assaulted into and constructed LZ Stallion in the A Shau Valley. Within two days after its arrival 1st Battalion captured the largest cache accredited to the 1st Brigade since its arrival in the Republic of Vietnam, Company D captured 5 1½-ton trucks, crew-served weapons, mine detectors, flame throwers, 135 cases of 37-mm ammunition, 35 cases of black uniforms, 440 AK-47 rifles, large drums of diesel fuel, explosives and food supplies. With the close of Operation Delaware and the start of Operation Jeb Stuart III, the 1st Battalion, 8th Cavalry returned to operating in Quang Tri Province, in the general vicinity of Quang Tri City. Immediately after its return the battalion made contact with the enemy. On 18 May 1968 the night perimeter of Company B was attacked by PAVN soldiers. The result of this encounter was twelve PAVN killed, one POW, 10 grenades, and 10 small arms weapons captured. For the remainder of the months of May, June and July contact was light and scattered.

On 24 August 1968, 1st Battalion, 8th Cavalry aided in exploiting a minor contact and wound up inflicting heavy losses on elements of the PAVN K8 Main Force Battalion. An estimated 80% of the enemy unit was killed in the four-day fight which took place in three coastal villages northwest of Quang Tri City. The First and Second Companies of the K8 Battalion had linked up in the villages of Van Phong and Dong Bao, and the Fourth Company was stationed two kilometers to the south in the village of La Duy. Their mission was to secure the hamlets and villages northeast of Quang Tri in preparation for an attack on the city. The day after the PAVN arrived, however, three helicopters from 1st Squadron, 9th Cavalry hovered over Van Phong on a snatch operation. PAVN gunners fired on the helicopters. Within minutes, American forces were speeding to the contact area, and in a few hours a cordon had been secured around the two villages. Company A and B, 1st Battalion 8th Cavalry, which had been operating seven miles (11 km) northwest of the fighting, were flown into the northern section of the cordon. At the same time, Troops A and C, 3rd Squadron, 5th Cavalry rolled up the beach from the south in tanks and armored personnel carriers (APCs). Company C, 1st Battalion, 8th Cavalry and Troop D, 1–9th Cavalry, were also brought in. Brigade scout helicopters darted in and out of the villages, providing suppressive fire as the ground units maneuvered into position. When the cordon was secured, a Psyops team flew over the area broadcasting warnings for the civilians to come out of the villages. Tube artillery and aerial rocket artillery (ARA) were called in later and pounded the area throughout the night as ground fighting increased. On the morning of 25 August air strikes and naval gun fire joined the barrage, and by late afternoon, 1/8th Cavalry prepared for a sweep of the area. They met little resistance, mopping up in the villages continued throughout the day, when new fighting erupted in the area. The reconnaissance platoon, Company B, of the 1st Battalion, 8th Cavalry were operating at La Duy when they made contact with 4th Company. The cavalrymen pulled back while ARA was brought in for support. Company C was immediately air assaulted to the area. When the rocket firing helicopters expended, the 1/8th made a sweep of the village. The PAVN were in bunkers, spider holes and trenches, and it took several hours to silence their guns. The enemy body count for this four-day engagement swelled to 148 PAVN killed, 14 POWs and 4 Chieu Hoi, 9 crew-served weapons and 54 small arms weapons.

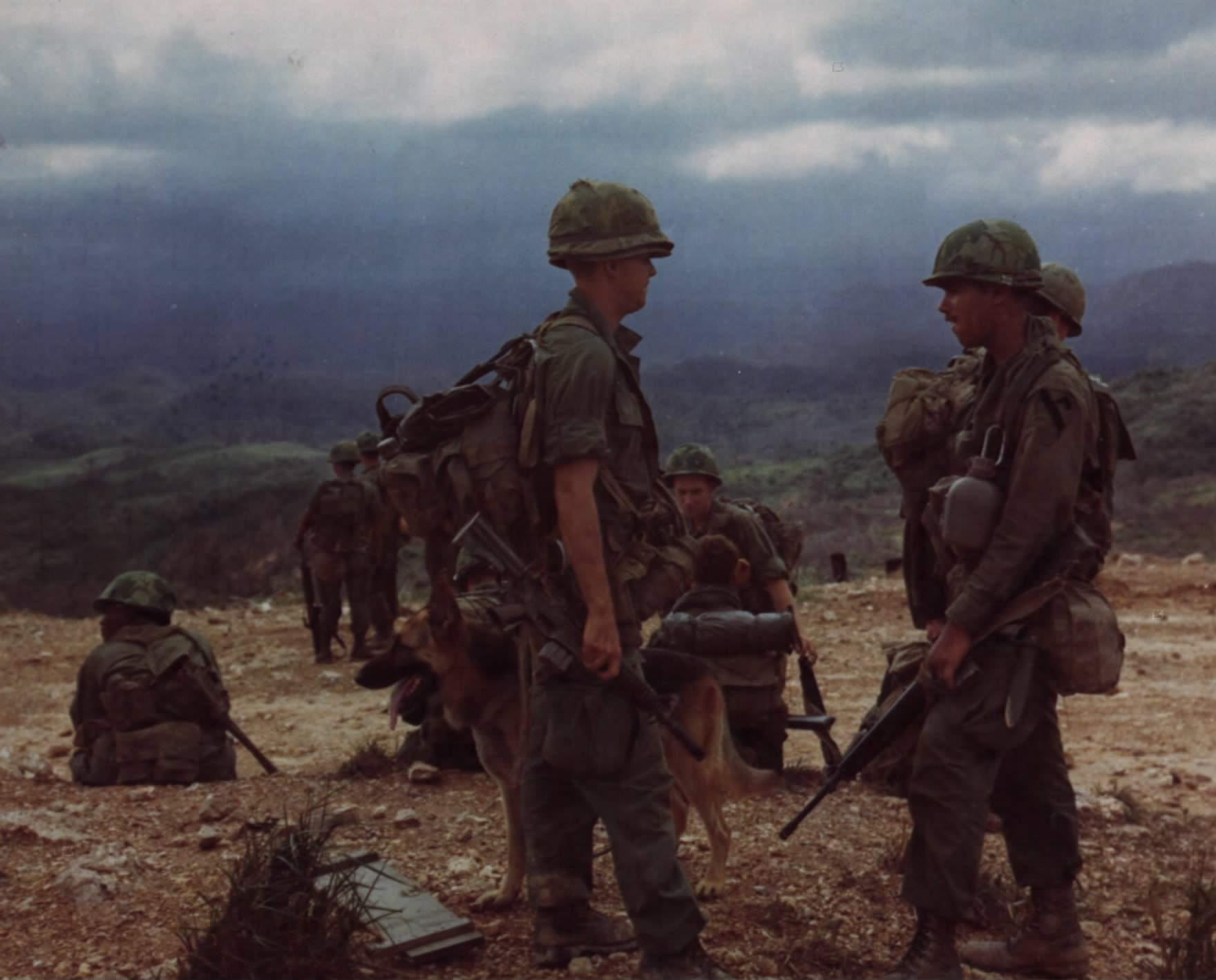
Members of Company "A", 2nd Battalion, 8th Cavalry wait for helicopters that will take them into a mountainous area located approximately 10 km from Quang Tri to search for a bunker complex, 13 October 1968

During the months of September and October the 1st Battalion, 8th Cavalry conducted search and clear operations, as part of Operation Comanche Falls, in the Ba Long Valley, west of the Trach Han River. There were many entrenched sites and built-up areas discovered which were exploited and destroyed by 1st Battalion. Captured enemy equipment included 9 individual weapons, small arms ammunition, B-40 rockets, booby-traps, medical supplies, a Chinese ohm meter, grenades, an American-made sewing machine and 122-mm rocket fuses, warheads and mortars. In addition there were two PAVN killed, one Vietcong (VC) killed, one VC-POW and 15 PAVN/VC bodies found in graves. In the beginning of November through the 1st Air Cavalry Division moved from I Corps to III Corps to join Operation Toan Thang II. 1/8th Cavalry was airlifted, along with land transportation, to the Tây Ninh Combat Base, in the vicinity of Tay Ninh City. The unit reached its destination on 3 November 1968. Immediately after constructing LZ Mustang, the cavalrymen began uncovering numerous bunker complexes. During the month of November over 600 such complexes were found. In these complexes were models of American aircraft, including helicopters whittled out of wood, along with antiaircraft positions, classroom containing 19 new bleachers and communications facilities. A number of picnic tables dotted some of the complexes, along with fresh meat, fish and livestock.

Heavy contact with the enemy was made in the latter part of the month. On 23 November 1968 the lead platoon of Company D was pinned down by heavy automatic weapons fire. There was no safe way that the company could bring in fire support without endangering their own lives, thus enemy positions had to be located and marked with hand-thrown smoke grenades. With the successful finding and marking of enemy placements, aerial rocket artillery (ARA) was brought into the fight. After suppression elements had been expended, the men of Company D pushed out the deeply entrenched PAVN killing 12. After battling the PAVN for six weeks in War Zone C, the (Honor and Courage) Battalion redeployed on Operation Navajo Horse (15 December 1968) to the southwest where the threatened 4th PAVN offensive was expected to be launched. Combat assaulting into the lowlands west of Chu Chi, the first elements of Company D secured the landing zone. CH-47s carrying troops, supplies, and the battalion command act section flew approximately 100 sorties to LZ Tracy during the day. Companies A and B closed out LZ Mustang and made the 50-mile (80 km) flight south on 17 December 1968.

=== Transition and Desert Storm ===
Following a tour in Southeast Asia, the Mustangs returned to the United States with the 1st Cavalry Division. Stationed at Fort Hood, Texas, the battalion was reorganized as an armored unit. In 1986, the battalion was organized as a combined arms maneuver battalion. The battalion relinquished a tank company in exchange for an M-2 equipped infantry company, one of the first permanently structured units of this nature in the Army.

In the early months of 1991, the 3rd Battalion 8th Cavalry participated in combat actions in Southwest Asia, as part of the 2nd Brigade 3rd Armored Division, where it had been assigned since 16 February 1987, and earned the following streamers: Defense of Saudi Arabia, Liberation and Defense of Kuwait, and Cease Fire. For these actions, the 3rd Battalion, 8th Cavalry was awarded the Valorous Unit Award streamer embroidered IRAQ.

4–8 Cav as a part of the 2nd Brigade 3rd Armored Division also saw heavy combat during Desert Storm.

With the Iraqi invasion of Kuwait in 1990, the battalion deployed to the Kingdom of Saudi Arabia for Operations Desert Shield and Desert Storm. In August 1990, the task force was alerted to deploy to Southwest Asia as part of the Allied response to the Iraqi invasion of Kuwait. The task force led the 1st CavalryDivision into the Saudi Arabian desert, arriving 28 September 1990. From 10 February to 1 March, the 1st Battalion, 8th Cavalry participated in five combat missions, culminating in a move over 300 kilometers in two days. For its actions the unit was awarded their 2nd Valorous Unit Award. The Mustangs redeployed to Fort Hood in April 1991.

In December 1995, the 3-8 Cav Mustangs turned in their M1A1 tanks and became the first battalion in the United States Army to field the M1A2 Main Battle Tank.

Operation Desert Strike

In March 1997 when Saddam Hussein appeared to be planning to invade Kuwait again, 3/8 CAV deployed along with the 3rd Brigade Combat Team, 1st Cavalry Division to Kuwait for a combat mission. Upon arrival in theatre, Saddam Hussein withdrew his forces just 12 hours and the mission became a training mission. While there were hostile actions from the Iraqi military, no American lives were lost. The M1 Abrams, again showed its dominance. The battalion redeployed to Fort Hood October 1997.

=== Bosnia ===
In June 1998 the 1st Cavalry Division was alerted for deployment to Bosnia for Operation Joint Forge, 1–8 Cavalry was chosen to become a part of the Ironhorse Brigade joining their sister unit 2–8 Cavalry. In August 1998 the 2nd Battalion 8th Cavalry Regiment was deployed to Camp Bedrock, while their Alpha company was the base security for Camp Comanche, the 1st Battalion, 8th Cavalry Regiment was positioned at Camp McGovern. In March 1999 the 1st Brigade Combat Team was redeployed to home station at Fort Hood, TX.

After their return to Fort Hood, 1st Battalion 8th Cavalry was placed back into the 2nd Brigade Combat Team. Once both 1st and 2nd Brigades were situated they began the process of transitioning to the Force XXI turning in their tanks for the new M1A2 SEP version, which provides better optics along with a digital command and control system. Also part of the transition was that the Delta companies were deactivated and the headquarters were restructured, the remaining troops were integrated throughout the brigade and the division.

=== Iraq ===
2nd Battalion, 8th Cavalry Regiment 1st Armored Brigade Combat Team, 1st Cavalry Division "Stallions" conducted M1 Abrams, Bradley Fighting Vehicles and Mortar live fire demonstration, from Jan. 21 through Jan. 23, 2021, in Pabradė Training Area, Lithuania.

Operation Iraqi Freedom 2004–2005

1st, 2nd, and 3rd Battalions all deployed to Iraq in 2004 for Operation Iraqi Freedom.

1st Battalion was reorganized as part of the new 5th Brigade Combat Team (5th BCT), which was built around the division artillery headquarters. They presented farmers in the Al Rashid region with four new tractors on 9 and 10 June 2004. As part the 5th BCT plan to improve agriculture in Al Rashid, members of the 1st Battalion, civil affairs team, presented farmers of Al Boetha with more than 68 tons of seed, fertilizer and other supplies at the Al Ahar School on 4 August 2004. The seed delivery started 6 July. The distribution was one of many to take over two weeks, just in time for the second planting season. The 1st Battalion was engaged in various combat action in the Al-Rashid area of Baghdad. Abu-Bashir and Al-Doura Markets saw several large-scale attacks on U.S. forces as these areas were hotspots for hidden insurgent activity. The 1st Battalion lost five soldiers KIA to combat in these engagements and numerous wounded.

In March 2004, 2nd Battalion, the Stallion Battalion, deployed to Eastern Baghdad as part of the 1st "Ironhorse" Brigade. It was stationed in the former Camp Cuervo, later called FOB Rustamiyah. It fought in Sadr City and other hot spots against the Mahdi Army, a Shia militia. Deployed with one of its organic tank companies equipped with M1A2 tanks—A Company ACES; the remaining two line companies, Bulldog and Cobra Companies, were deployed as "dragoons" as they fought in a dismounted and motorized role and sustained significant casualties fighting inside the tight alleyways of Sadr City and New Baghdad. Headquarters Company and the Forward Support Company of the 115th Forward Support Battalion also played a vital role in sustained combat operations. The 2nd Battalion helped keep the pressure on the Mahdi Militia, as part of the Ironhorse Brigade operations, from August 2004 until October 2004, when an unofficial ceasefire allowed the brigade to begin focusing more energy on helping the 2 million inhabitants of Sadr City with basic services. The battalion redeployed in March 2005 and was awarded the Valorous Unit Award (VUA) for its service.

The 3rd Battalion's headquarters were at FOB Warhorse, with C company attached to TF 2–7 at Camp Cooke in Taji Iraq. C company, 3–8 Cavalry (Cougars) participated in the battle in An Najaf and the Battle of Fallujah with TF 2–7.

In March 2005 the 1st Battalion redeployed with 1st CAV. In their place 6th Squadron, the reconnaissance, surveillance, and target acquisition squadron for 4th Brigade, 3rd Infantry Division assumed tactical duties. 6th Squadron remained on FOB Falcon until they were given a change of mission and were chosen to stand up and train the 5th Iraqi Army Brigade and moved to FOB Honor. Once the 5th Iraqi Army Brigade had completed its training, it assisted the 6th Squadron in its new mission to secure Airport Road.

Iraq 2006–08

In October, 2006, the 3rd "Warhorse" Battalion deployed for a second time to Iraq for OIF 06–08. The battalion was detached from the 3rd "Greywolf" Brigade of the 1st Cavalry Division and operated under the control of the 3rd "Panther" Brigade of the 82nd Airborne Division (later replaced by 1st Brigade, 101st Airborne Division) in Multi-National Division (North). The battalion was responsible for the southern third of Salah Ad Din Province and conducted operations primarily from FOB Paliwoda with companies also operating from FOB O'Ryan, FOB Brassfield-Mora, and LSA Anaconda. The battalion area of operations (AO COURAGE) encompassed the cities of Balad, Duluiyah and Dujayl. Although it was a mechanized unit, the large size of its zone and the presence of the Tigris River led the battalion to conduct dozens of air assaults and several small-boat operations in addition to its mounted patrols and raids. In the final months of its tour, 3–8 Cavalry stood up a dozen Sons of Iraq local security elements, one of the first units in MND-North to do so.

Not long after deployment of 3–8 Cavalry, the 1st "Mustang" Battalion deployed to Baghdad. The battalion was detached from the 2nd "Blackjack" Brigade and attached to the 2nd Brigade, 2nd Infantry Division. The battalion operated from FOB Rustamiyah, patrolling New Baghdad (Tisa Nissan).

The 2nd "Stallion" Battalion deployed north of Baghdad under the 1st "Ironhorse" Brigade of the 1st Cavalry Division. Operating from Taji, the battalion patrolled the area around Tarmiyah, an insurgent hotspot.

Like most units involved in OIF 06–08, the battalions of the 8th Cavalry had their deployments extended from 12 months to 15. Upon returning home, the battalion's final casualty toll was 27.

2008

January 2008 to December 2008, was an entire year of hard training in combat operations for the 1-8 Mustangs. Standing ready for the call while continuing to train hard throughout that summer, the battalion would soon learn it would officially be deployed to Iraq once again that following year.

From September to October 2008, the 1–8 Mustangs were sent to Fort Polk, Louisiana, to extend their training for their upcoming deployment to Iraq. They spent about a month doing a multitude of rigorous training in what is known as the J.R.T.C. (Joint Readiness Training Center). Similar to the old (N.T.C.) program in California, it is designed to simulate what it is like to be deployed to Iraq. This includes the culture, the environment, combat operations, and the way of life while deployed, amongst many other things. After completing training, the Mustangs headed back home to Fort Hood, Texas, to continue preparing for their upcoming deployment.

2009

In January 2009, 1–8 Cavalry again deployed the Mustangs overseas for another combat tour. They were sent to the Kirkuk Province in Northern Iraq for a 12-month deployment. The Battalion was led by LTC David Lesperance and CSM Robert French. The Battalion split their stationing of soldiers between J.S.S. McHenry and F.O.B. Warrior. J.S.S. McHenry was located only a few minutes away from the very hostile village of Hawija. As of March 2006, the area of Hawija was considered one of the most dangerous in all of Iraq, with U.S. Soldiers and the Foreign Press Corps in Baghdad dubbing Hawija "Anbar of the North,". This close proximity would lead to daily mortar attacks, sometimes up to three times a day. The most common attacks on active patrol units, and traveling convoys, were in the form of IED attacks, RKG-3 grenade attacks, hand grenade attacks, moltov cocktails, RPG attacks, and small arms fire. After a year of combat, the unit redeployed back home to Fort Hood, Texas in mid-late December 2009.

2013

In early 2013 6-8 Cav stationed at Ft Stewart Ga was deployed to Logar Province Afghanistan. HHT and Apocalypse “A” Trp were stationed out of FOB, Forward Operation Base Shank. Bushmaster “B” Trp was in the north out of COP McClain. And Chaos “C” Trp was located at COP Baraki Barak.

== Current status ==
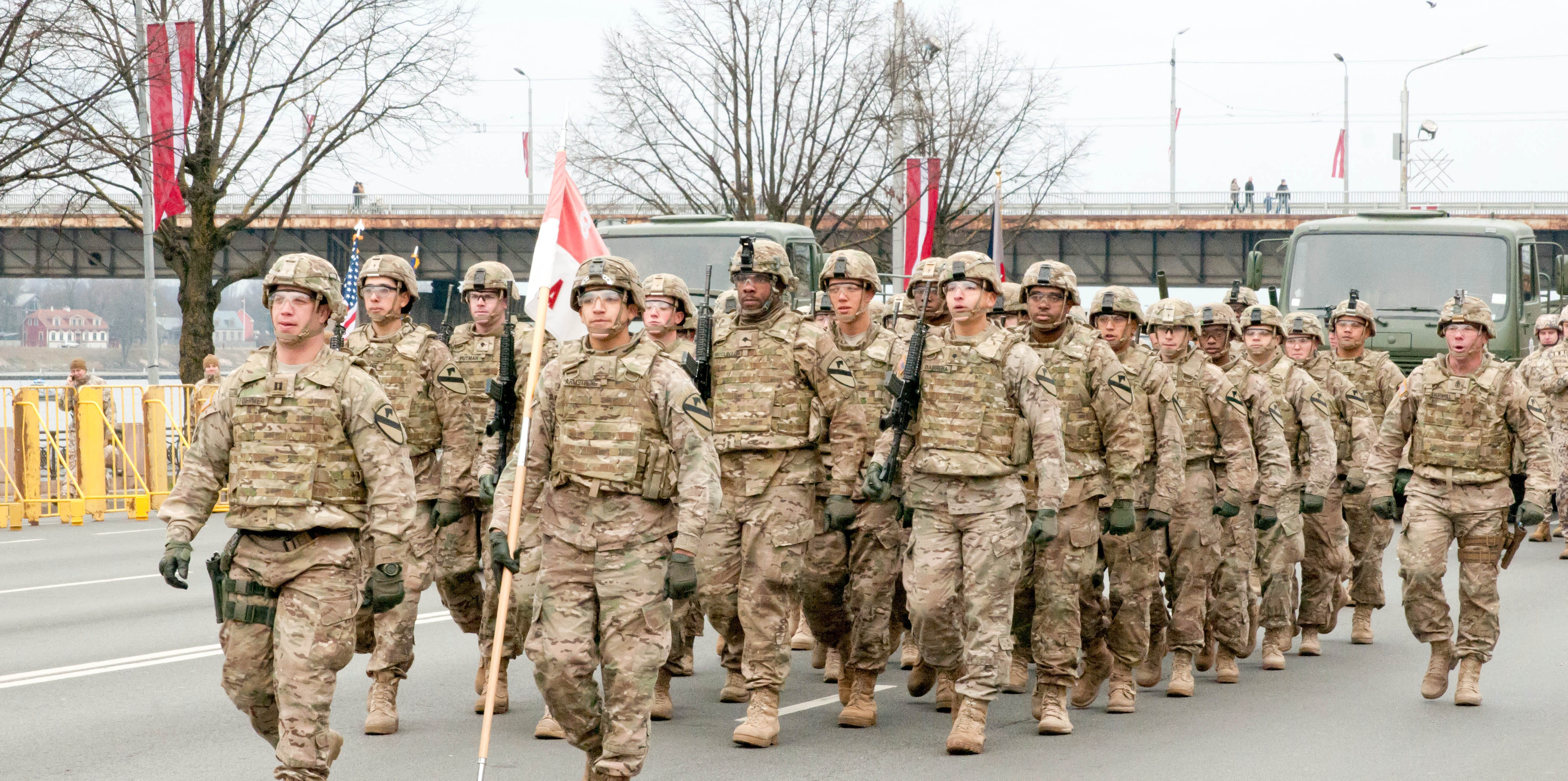
Company "A", 2nd Battalion, 8th Cavalry Regiment during the 2014 Latvia Day Parade in Riga.

- 1st Battalion, known as the "Mustangs", is a combined arms battalion of the 2nd Brigade, 1st Cavalry Division stationed at Fort Hood, Texas. Lieutenant Colonel Ramey D. Moore currently commands the Mustang Battalion.
- 2nd "Stallion" Battalion is a combined arms battalion of the 1st Brigade, 1st Cavalry Division stationed at Fort Hood, Texas. Currently Lieutenant Colonel Robert A. Pough is the commander.
- 3rd Battalion, known as "Warhorse", is a combined arms battalion of the 3rd Brigade, 1st Cavalry Division stationed at Fort Hood, Texas. Lieutenant Colonel John Nimmons commands the Warhorse battalion.
- 6th Squadron is the cavalry squadron of the 2nd Brigade, 3rd Infantry Division, stationed at Fort Stewart, Georgia. In 2022 the Squadron became the most modernized and lethal Cavalry Squadron in the Army after receiving Abrams M1a2 SEPv3 tanks and M2a4 Bradleys. They also use the call sign "Mustang". As of 2022, the squadron is commanded by LTC James Perkins.

== Campaign streamers ==
Indian Wars

- Comanches
- Apaches
- Pine Ridge
- Arizona, 1867
- Arizona, 1868
- Arizona, 1869
- Oregon, 1868
- Mexico, 1877

World War II

- New Guinea
- Bismarck Archipelago
- Leyte
- Luzon

Korean War

- UN Defensive
- UN Offensive
- CCF Intervention
- First UN Counteroffensive
- CCF Spring Offensive
- UN Summer-Fall Offensive
- Second Korean Winter
- Korea, Summer-Fall, 1952
- Third Korean Winter

Vietnam War

- Defense
- Counteroffensive
- Counteroffensive, Phase II
- Counteroffensive, Phase III
- Tet Counteroffensive

Gulf War

- Defense of Saudi Arabia
- Liberation and Defense of Kuwait
- Cease Fire

Iraq

=== Decorations ===
- Streamer, Presidential Unit Citation, embroidered LUZON
- Streamer, Presidential Unit Citation, embroidered MANUS
- Streamer, Presidential Unit Citation, embroidered 17 October 1994 to 4 July 1945
- Streamer, Presidential Unit Citation, embroidered TAEGU
- Streamer, Republic of Korea Presidential Unit Citation, embroidered WAEGWAN-TAEGU
- Streamer, Chryssoun Aristion Andria (Bravery Gold Medal of Greece), embroidered KOREA
- Streamer, Presidential Unit Citation, embroidered PLEIKU PROVINCE
- Streamer, Presidential Unit Citation, embroidered TRUNG LONG
- Streamer, Valorous Unit Award, embroidered FISHHOOK
- Streamer Valorous Unit Award, embroidered IRAQ (3/8 Cav, 4/8 Cav)
- Draper Award A Company 2nd Battalion 8th United States Cavalry
- Draper Award D Company 3rd Battalion 8th United States Cavalry 2010
- Armor and Cavalry Leadership Award (formerly the Draper Award) B Company 1st Battalion 8th United States Cavalry 2017
