= John Tracy (Medal of Honor) =

United States Army Medal of Honor recipient (1848–1918)

- Born: Henry G. Nabers; December 28, 1848; Dublin, Ireland
- Died: May 29, 1918 (aged 69); St. Louis, Missouri, United States
- Burial place: Calvary Cemetery and Mausoleum
- Military career
- Allegiance: United States
- Branch: United States Army
- Service years: c. 1869–1870
- Rank: Private
- Unit: 8th U.S. Cavalry
- Conflicts: Indian Wars; Apache Wars
- Awards: Medal of Honor

Private John Tracy (December 28, 1848 – May 29, 1918), born Henry G. Nabers, was an Irish-born soldier in the U.S. Army who served with the 8th U.S. Cavalry during the Apache Wars. He was one of thirty-two men received the Medal of Honor for gallantry in fighting Cochise and the Apache Indians in the Chiricahua Mountains of Arizona, later known as the "Campaign of the Rocky Mesa", on October 20, 1869.

== Biography ==
Henry G. Nabers was born in Dublin, Ireland, on December 28, 1848. He later emigrated to the United States and, under the alias John Tracy, enlisted as a private in the United States Army in either Chicago, Illinois or St. Paul, Minnesota.

He was assigned to Company G of the 8th Cavalry Regiment and sent to the Arizona Territory where he saw considerable action during the Apache Wars. He particularly distinguished himself during the campaign against Cochise in late-1869. On October 5, he was part of a small cavalry detachment from Fort Bowie, under the command of Lieutenant William H. Winters and Captain Reuben F. Bernard, in pursuit of an Apache raiding party. Earlier that day, these Apaches had massacred a stage coach en route to Tucson and then attacked a group of cowboys in Sulphur Springs Valley. His unit eventually caught up to them at Cochise's stronghold in Chiricahua Mountains, above Rucker Canyon, where they engaged in a major battle, later known as the "Campaign of the Rocky Mesa", on October 20, 1869.

Tracy was cited for "gallantry in action" and one of thirty-two members of the 1st and 8th U.S. Cavalry who received the Medal of Honor four months later.

He died on May 29, 1918, at age 69 and was interred at the Calvary Cemetery and Mausoleum in St. Louis, Missouri. Tracy remained buried in an unmarked grave for nearly a century before a campaign, headed by Connie Nisinger in the spring of 2003, eventually resulted in an official Medal of Honor headstone being placed at his grave site.

== Medal of Honor citation ==
Rank and organization: Private, Company G, 8th U.S. Cavalry. Place and date: At Chiricahua Mountains, Ariz., 20 October 1869. Entered service at: St. Paul, Minn. Birth: Ireland. Date of issue: 14 February 1870.

Citation:

Bravery in action with Indians.

== See also ==
- List of Medal of Honor recipients for the Indian Wars
