= Frederick Jarvis =

American soldier in the U.S. Army

- Born: 1841; Essex County, New York, United States
- Died: April 8, 1894 (aged 53); Salt Lake City, Utah
- Burial place: Salt Lake City Cemetery
- Military career
- Allegiance: United States of America
- Branch: United States Army
- Service years: c. 1869–1870
- Rank: Sergeant
- Unit: 1st U.S. Cavalry
- Conflicts: Indian Wars; Apache Wars
- Awards: Medal of Honor

Sergeant Frederick Jarvis (1841 – April 8, 1894) was an American soldier in the United States Army who served with the 1st U.S. Cavalry regiment during the Apache Wars. He was one of thirty-two men received the Medal of Honor for gallantry fighting Cochise and the Apache Indians in the Chiricahua Mountains of Arizona, known as the "Campaign of the Rocky Mesa", on October 20, 1869.

== Biography ==
Frederick Jarvis was born in Essex County, New York in 1841. He enlisted in the United States Army in Hudson, Michigan and was assigned to 1st U.S. Cavalry regiment and later took part in the Apache Wars during the late 1860s. Jarvis was among the cavalry troopers who pursued an Apache raiding party that had massacred a stage coach en route to Tucson and attacked a group of cowboys in the Sulphur Springs Valley. A small detachment under Lieutenant William H. Winters left Fort Bowie on October 8, later joined on the trail by Captain Reuben F. Bernard, and followed the Apaches to the Chiricahua Mountains stronghold of Cochise, between Red Rock Mountain and Turtle Mountain, where they encountered them on October 20, 1869. Jarvis was one of thirty-two soldiers of the 1st and 8th U.S. Cavalry regiment cited for "gallantry in action", in what would become known as the "Campaign of the Rocky Mesa", and received the Medal of Honor on February 14, 1870. Jarvis died in Salt Lake City, Utah on April 8, 1894, and interred in the Salt Lake City Cemetery. He is one of eight Utah MOH recipients and one of three buried in the state.

== Medal of Honor citation ==
Rank and organization: Sergeant, Company G, 1st U.S. Cavalry. Place and date: At Chiricahua Mountains, Ariz., 20 October 1869. Entered service at: ------. Birth: Essex County, N.Y. Date of issue: 14 February 1870.

Citation:

Gallantry in action.

== See also ==
- List of Medal of Honor recipients for the Indian Wars
