= Daniel H. Rucker =

U.S. Army Quartermaster General

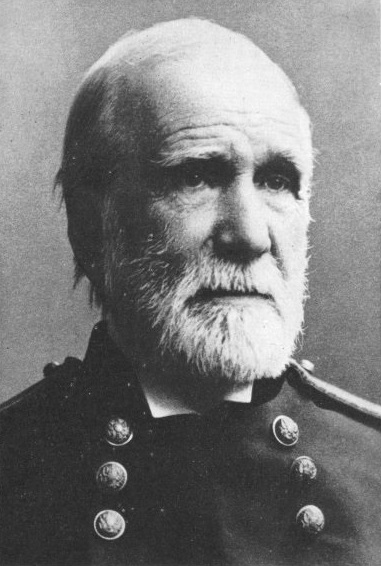
- The Washington Herald, November 25, 1906
- Born: April 28, 1812; Belleville, New Jersey, U.S.
- Died: January 6, 1910 (aged 97); Washington, D.C.
- Burial place: Arlington National Cemetery
- Spouse(s): Flora Coody (m. 1839; died 1845) Irene Curtis (m. 1850; died 1902)
- Children: 9
- Relatives: William Macomb (grandfather); Alexander Macomb (uncle); Philip Sheridan (son-in-law)
- Military career
- Allegiance: United States; Union
- Branch: United States Army; Union Army
- Service years: 1837–1861, 1866–1882 (U.S. Army); 1861–1866 (Union Army)
- Rank: Brigadier General (Army); Major General (Brevet)
- Units: United States Dragoons; U.S. Army Quartermaster Corps
- Commands: Company E, 1st Regiment of Dragoons; Washington, D.C. Quartermaster Depot; First Brigade, Civil War Defenses of Washington; Chief Quartermaster, Department of the East; Chief Quartermaster, Military Division of the Missouri; Philadelphia Quartermaster Depot; Quartermaster General of the United States Army
- Conflicts: American Indian Wars; Mexican–American War; American Civil War

Daniel Henry Rucker (April 28, 1812 – January 6, 1910) was a career officer in the United States Army. He was commissioned in 1837 and served for nearly 45 years, including during the American Indian Wars, Mexican–American War, and American Civil War. He attained the rank of brigadier general and was most notable for his service as Assistant Quartermaster General of the United States Army, then Quartermaster General. Rucker received brevet promotions to major general of United States Volunteers and major general in the Regular Army in commendation of his Civil War service. Rucker was the father-in-law of General Philip Sheridan.

== Early life ==
Daniel H. Rucker was born in Belleville, New Jersey on April 28, 1812, a son of John Anthony Rucker and Sarah Jane (Dring) Macomb. Sarah Macomb Rucker (1789–1873) was the daughter of William Macomb. Her sister Catherine was the wife of General Alexander Macomb. Her sister Eliza was the wife of Brevet Brigadier General Henry Whiting. Her sister Anne was the wife of Lieutenant Colonel Aeneas MacKay, who served as the U.S. Army's Deputy Quartermaster General.

Rucker's siblings included William Alexander Rucker, a career U.S. Army officer who attained the rank of colonel in the Paymaster department. The Rucker family moved to Grosse Ile, Michigan soon after the close of the War of 1812, and Rucker was raised and educated in Grosse Ile. His uncle Alexander Macomb was serving as Commanding General of the United States Army when Rucker applied for a commission in the United States Army in 1837; he was accepted and received appointment as a second lieutenant in the 1st Regiment of Dragoons in October of that year.

== Start of career ==
Rucker's regiment was sent to Fort Leavenworth, Kansas soon after he received his commission, and he took part in a campaign against the Ute people, during which he formed a friendship with Kit Carson that lasted until Carson's 1868 death. He served at several posts in the Midwest and Southwest United States during the 1840s, and was promoted to first lieutenant in 1844 and captain in 1847. During the Mexican–American War, he served with his regiment and rose from command of Company E to command of a squadron. He received a brevet promotion to major in recognition of his gallantry at the Battle of Buena Vista.

In 1849, Rucker transferred to the Quartermaster Corps. He then began twelve years of assistant quartermaster appointments, mostly in the Southwest United States, and primarily in New Mexico Territory.

== Civil War ==
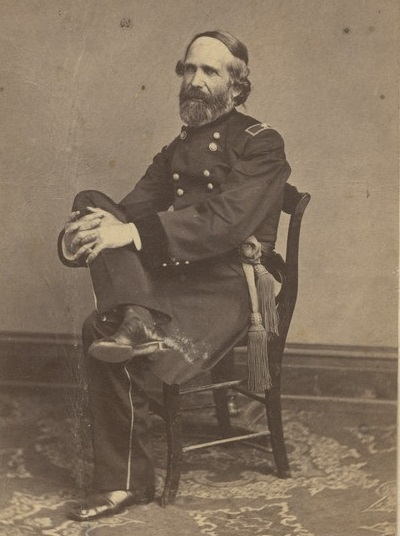
Carte-de-visite photo of Rucker, circa 1863

At the start of the American Civil War in early 1861, Rucker declined appointment as a major in the 6th Cavalry so he could continue serving as a quartermaster. In August 1861, he was promoted to major in the Quartermaster Corps and assigned to command the Washington, D.C. Quartermaster Depot. In September 1861, he was promoted to colonel of Volunteers as an additional aide-de-camp to General George B. McClellan, an appointment he carried out while continuing to command Washington Depot. Rucker remained in command through the end of the war, during which Washington Depot handled the majority of food, equipment, and supplies provided to the Union Army in the Eastern Theater of the American Civil War. In May 1863, he was promoted to brigadier general of Volunteers.

When Confederate forces threatened Washington, D.C. in the summer of 1864, Rucker participated in the Civil War Defenses of Washington by organizing available quartermaster soldiers as the First Brigade, which he commanded in and around Fort Stevens. In July 1864, Rucker received brevet promotions to lieutenant colonel, colonel, and brigadier general in the Regular Army. In March 1865, he received promotion to brevet major general of Volunteers. After the war, Rucker oversaw the sale at auction of surplus animals and equipment that were no longer needed, the allocation of remaining supplies and equipment to various Army posts, and the downsizing of the Quartermaster Corps.

Following the Assassination of Abraham Lincoln, on April 15, 1865, Rucker procured a coffin and provided a contingent of soldiers so Lincoln's remains could be carried from the Petersen House. After the soldiers brought Lincoln's body from the house to a waiting cart, Rucker led a detachment of infantry and cavalry as they escorted the coffin to the White House. Afterwards, Rucker was among those who remained in the second-floor guest room when surgeon Joseph Janvier Woodward conducted an autopsy.

== Post–Civil War ==
In July 1866, Rucker was promoted to colonel in the Regular Army and assigned as the Army's Assistant Quartermaster General. In September of that year, he received brevet promotions to brigadier general and major general in the Regular Army in recognition of his performance during the Civil War. Rucker was assigned as Chief Quartermaster of the Department of the East in 1868. In 1869, he was assigned as Chief Quartermaster for the Military Division of the Missouri, with headquarters in Chicago. In 1875, Rucker was assigned to command of the Philadelphia Quartermaster Depot, and he served in this post until 1882.

On February 13, 1882, Rucker was promoted to brigadier general and assigned as Quartermaster General of the United States Army. At the same time, he applied for retirement. His request was approved, and he retired due to age on February 23.

== Later life ==
In retirement, Rucker lived in Washington, D.C. and continued to take an active interest in Army affairs. He was a member of the Aztec Club of 1847, Grand Army of the Republic, and Military Order of the Loyal Legion of the United States. Rucker died in Washington on January 6, 1910. He was buried at Arlington National Cemetery.

== Legacy ==
The U.S. Army ship General D. H. Rucker, a concrete-hulled steamer, was launched in 1921. It was used as a personnel transport between military bases near Newport News, Virginia and Fort Caswell, North Carolina. Rucker remained in service for nearly twenty years, until a fire destroyed her wooden superstructure. Rucker's hulk was subsequently sunk to create a breakwater off Virginia Beach, Virginia.

== Family ==
In February 1839, Rucker married Flora Coody (or Coodey) (1824–1845) at Fort Gibson, Oklahoma, which was then Indian Territory. Flora Coody was of Cherokee ancestry and was a niece of Chief John Ross. Daniel and Flora Rucker were the parents of four children— Ross, Louisa, and Henry, and another son who died young. Ross Rucker was born in 1841 and died at age 16. Henry Rucker was born in 1845 and died soon afterwards. Louisa Rucker was born in 1843 and died in 1924.

In April 1850, Rucker married Irene Curtis (1819–1902). They were the parents of five children— John Anthony (1851–1878), Irene (1856–1938), Sarah (1857–1955), William A. (1858–1870), and Francis Dring (1860–1893).

John A. Rucker was a first lieutenant in the 6th Cavalry Regiment when he died in an accidental drowning while attempting to save the life of another soldier. Fort Rucker, Arizona and Rucker Canyon, Arizona were named in his honor.

Francis D. Rucker was a first lieutenant in the 2nd Cavalry Regiment when he died from an accidental fall off his horse while hunting.

Irene Rucker was the wife of General Philip Sheridan.
