= James Sumner (soldier) =

- Born: 1840; London, England
- Died: July 5, 1912 (aged 71–72); Ventura, California
- Burial place: Cemetery Memorial Park, Ventura, California
- Military career
- Allegiance: United States of America
- Branch: United States Army
- Rank: Private
- Unit: 1st Cavalry Regiment
- Conflicts: Indian Wars • Apache Wars
- Awards: Medal of Honor

James Sumner (1840 – July 5, 1912) was a United States Army soldier and a recipient of the United States military's highest decoration, the Medal of Honor, for his actions in the Indian Wars of the western United States. An English immigrant, Sumner served as a cavalryman during the Apache Wars of southeastern Arizona Territory. He was awarded the Medal of Honor for advancing through heavy fire in a skirmish against a group of Chiricahua Indians led by Cochise.

== Early life and career ==
A native of London, England, Sumner immigrated to the United States and joined the Army from Chicago. He served as a private in Company G of the 1st Cavalry Regiment and was stationed at Fort Bowie in southeastern Arizona Territory during the Apache Wars.

== Medal of Honor action ==
On October 6, 1869, a group of Chiricahua warriors led by Cochise ambushed a Tucson-bound mail stagecoach near Dragoon Springs, on the northern end of the Dragoon Mountains. After killing and mutilating the single passenger and four escorting soldiers, the group attacked six cowboys, killing one, and stole 120 of their cattle. A cavalry patrol dispatched from Fort Bowie chased the Indians into the Chiricahua Mountains and, after a running fight which resulted in a dozen dead warriors, recovered the cattle. Sumner was part of a second patrol, composed of men from Company G, 1st Cavalry, and Company G, 8th Cavalry, which was sent out on the night of October 16 to continue the chase. The 61-man patrol, commanded by Captain Reuben F. Bernard, returned to the scene of the earlier fight and tracked Cochise and his warriors high into the mountains.

After finding an abandoned campsite on October 20 and continuing along a faint trail, the troopers came under fire from Indians positioned atop a rocky mesa flanked by deep canyons. Under orders from Captain Bernard, Sumner and others dismounted and charged up the steep side of the mesa, taking heavy fire the entire way. They reached a low ledge 30 yards (27 m) from the Apaches and were pinned down by combined bow and gun fire; two troopers were killed and one wounded. Bernard attempted to flank the Indians with another group of soldiers but found their position to be impregnable—the warriors held the high ground and had good cover from large boulders on the mesa top. Unable to advance and with the patrol's horses exposed to hostile fire, Bernard ordered a withdrawal. The skirmish resulted in eighteen dead Apaches. Bernard recommended all 32 troopers who had charged up the mesa for the Medal of Honor. Sumner's medal was awarded four months after the battle, on February 14, 1870. His official citation reads simply: "Gallantry in action".

== Later life and legacy ==
After his military service, Sumner moved to California, where he lived first in Los Angeles and then in Oxnard. He never married and had no children. Sumner died at age 72 of kidney failure at a hospital in Ventura and was buried there in city cemetery.

Falling into disrepair after years of neglect, the city cemetery and the adjacent St. Mary's Cemetery converted to a park by the city of Ventura in the early 1960s. All grave markers were removed, however roughly 3,000 bodies were never disinterred. Cemetery Memorial Park, as it is now known, is dotted with a few dozen flush grave markers placed by the city when requested. Sumner's bronze plaque headstone was placed by city in 1990 after being furnished by private donors.

The condition of Sumner's grave site received media attention in mid-2010, when the Ventura parks and recreation commission deferred and later rejected a request to move his remains to Bakersfield National Cemetery. Supporters of the move called the situation "disrespectful," noting that Cemetery Memorial Park had become a popular place for locals to walk their dogs and that the animals defecate on and near Sumner's grave. The commission stated its intention to commemorate those buried in the park which had been long delayed.

== See also ==
- List of Medal of Honor recipients
