= Camp Rucker =

Camp Rucker can refer to:

- Fort Rucker, Arizona
- Fort Novosel, Alabama, formerly Fort Rucker and Camp Rucker
