= Christian Steiner (soldier) =

United States Army Medal of Honor recipient (1843–1880)

- Born: 1843; Kingdom of Württemberg
- Died: August 5, 1880 (aged 37); Hot Springs, Arkansas, U.S.
- Burial place: Hollywood Cemetery
- Military career
- Allegiance: United States of America
- Branch: United States Army
- Service years: 1868–1873, 1874–1880
- Rank: Private
- Unit: 8th U.S. Cavalry
- Conflicts: Indian Wars; Apache Wars
- Awards: Medal of Honor

Private Christian Steiner (1843 – August 5, 1880) was a German-born American soldier in the U.S. Army who served as a saddler with the 8th U.S. Cavalry during the Apache Wars in the Arizona Territory. He was one of thirty-two men awarded the Medal of Honor for gallantry battling against Cochise and the Apache Indians in the Chiricahua Mountains on October 20, 1869.

== Biography ==
Christian Steiner was born in Württemberg, Germany in 1843. He later emigrated to the United States and settled in St. Louis, Missouri, amid a growing German-American population, joining the United States Army from that city in May 1868. As a saddler in Company G of the 8th U.S. Cavalry Regiment, he was assigned to frontier duty and took part in the southwest military campaigns against the Plains Indians.

Steiner was stationed in the Arizona Territory during the Apache Wars. He was among the sixty-one cavalry troopers from the 1st and 8th Cavalry Regiment who, on October 5, 1868, pursued an Apache raiding party under Cochise following attacks on a stage coach en route to Tucson and a group of cowboys in the Sulphur Springs Valley. Leaving Fort Bowie, he followed Lt. William H. Winters and Captain Reuben F. Bernard in a fifteen-day pursuit of Cochise's band, who had fled to the Apache stronghold in the Chiricahua Mountains (between Red Rock and Turtle Mountain), before finally catching up to them on October 20. In what was one of the major battles of the Apache campaign, famously called the "Campaign of the Rocky Mesa", Steiner was among the thirty-two soldiers cited for "gallantry in action" and officially awarded the Medal of Honor on February 14, 1870. He was discharged in May 1873, and re-enlisted in August of the following year. He died on August 5, 1880, at the age of 37, and buried at Hollywood Cemetery in Hot Springs, Arkansas.

== Medal of Honor citation ==
Rank and organization: Saddler, Company G, 8th U.S. Cavalry.

Place and date: At Chiricahua Mountains, Ariz., 20 October 1869.

Entered service at: --.

Birth: Germany.

Date of issue: 14 February 1870.

Citation:

Gallantry in action.

== See also ==
- List of Medal of Honor recipients for the Indian Wars
