= Francis Oliver (Medal of Honor) =

American soldier in the U.S. Army

- Born: c. 1832; Baltimore, Maryland, United States
- Died: July 28, 1880 (aged 48); Lewiston, Idaho
- Burial place: Normal Hill Cemetery
- Military career
- Allegiance: United States of America
- Branch: United States Army
- Service years: c. 1869–1870
- Rank: First Sergeant
- Unit: 1st U.S. Cavalry
- Conflicts: Indian Wars; Apache Wars
- Awards: Medal of Honor

Francis Oliver (c. 1832 – July 28, 1880) was an American soldier in the U.S. Army who served with the 1st U.S. Cavalry during the Indian Wars. He was one of thirty-two men received the Medal of Honor for gallantry against the Apache Indians in the Chiricahua Mountains, later known as the "Campaign of the Rocky Mesa", on October 20, 1869.

== Biography ==
Francis Oliver was born in Baltimore, Maryland in about 1832. Enlisting in the U.S. Army at Fort Fillmore, New Mexico, he was assigned to frontier duty with the 1st U.S. Cavalry and eventually reached the rank of first sergeant. Oliver saw action against the Apache in the Arizona Territory during the late 1860s, most notably, during the "Campaign of the Rocky Mesa" in late 1869. He was among the members of the 1st and 8th Cavalry, under the commands of Lieutenant William H. Winters and Captain Reuben F. Bernard, who pursued an Apache raiding party led by Cochise that had massacred a stage coach en route to Tucson and attacked a group of cowboys in the Sulphur Springs Valley on October 5, 1868. The cavalry detachment pursued the Apache to Cochise's stronghold in the Chiricahua Mountains where they did battle on October 20, 1869. Oliver led a group of troopers during the fight and was cited for bravery in action. He was among the 32 soldiers who received the Medal of Honor on February 14, 1870. Oliver died in Lewiston, Idaho on July 28, 1880, and buried in Normal Hill Cemetery.

== Medal of Honor citation ==
Rank and organization: First Sergeant, Company G, 1st U.S. Cavalry Place and date: At Chiricahua Mountains, Ariz., 20 October 1869. Entered service at: ------. Birth: Baltimore, Md. Date of issue: 14 February 1870.

Citation:

Bravery in action.

== See also ==
- List of Medal of Honor recipients for the Indian Wars
