= Christian Steiner =

Christian Steiner may refer to:

- Christian Steiner (soldier) (1843–1880), German-born American soldier in the U.S. Army
- Christian Steiner (ice dancer) (1960–2025), German ice dancer
