= William Smith (Medal of Honor, 1869) =

- Born: 1838; Bath, Maine, US
- Died: Unknown
- Military career
- Allegiance: United States of America
- Branch: United States Army
- Service years: 1869-
- Rank: Private
- Units: Company G, 8th U.S. Cavalry
- Conflicts: Indian Wars
- Awards: Medal of Honor

William Smith was a private in the United States Army who received the Medal of Honor for gallantry in action at Chiricahua Mountains, Arizona Territory on October 20, 1869, during the Indian Wars.

== Biography ==
William Smith was born in Bath, Maine in 1838 and enlisted in the United States Army in 1869.

He should not be confused with William H. Smith, who also received the Medal of Honor for gallantry in action in the same location on the same day.

== Medal of Honor citation ==
Rank and organization: Private, Company G, 8th U.S. Cavalry. Place and date: At Chiricahua Mountains, Ariz., October 20, 1869. Entered service at. ------. Birth. Bath, Maine. Date of issue: February 14, 1870.

Citation:

Gallantry in action.

== See also ==
- List of Medal of Honor recipients
- List of Medal of Honor recipients for the Indian Wars
- William Smith (Medal of Honor, 1864), a different recipient with this name
