= William H. Smith (Medal of Honor) =

- Born: 1847; Lapeer County, Michigan
- Died: October 5, 1877 (aged 29–30); Camp Howard, Idaho Territory
- Military career
- Allegiance: United States of America
- Branch: United States Army
- Rank: Private
- Units: Company G, 1st Cavalry Regiment
- Conflicts: Indian Wars
- Awards: Medal of Honor

William H. Smith (1847 – October 5, 1877) was a Private in the United States Army who received the Medal of Honor for gallantry in action at Chiricahua Mountains, Arizona Territory on October 20, 1869, during the Indian Wars.

== Biography ==
Smith was born in 1847 in Lapeer County, Michigan, and joined the Army in 1869. He died at Camp Howard, Idaho Territory on 5 October 1877.

He should not be confused with William Smith, who was also awarded the Medal of Honor for gallantry in action in the same location on the same day.

== Medal of Honor citation ==
Rank and organization: Private, Company G, 1st Cavalry Regiment. Place and date: At Chiricahua Mountains, Ariz., October 20, 1869. Entered service at: ------. Birth: Lapeer County, Mich. Date of issue: February 14, 1870.

Citation:

Gallantry in action.

== See also ==
- List of Medal of Honor recipients for the Indian Wars
