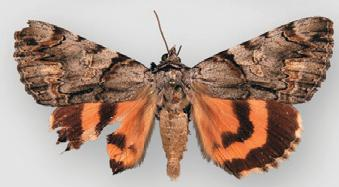

Scientific classification
- Kingdom: Animalia
- Phylum: Arthropoda
- Class: Insecta
- Order: Lepidoptera
- Superfamily: Noctuoidea
- Family: Erebidae
- Genus: Catocala
- Species: C. violenta

Binomial name
- Catocala violenta H. Edwards, 1880

Synonyms
- Catocala chiricahua Poling, 1901; Catocala chiracahua

= Catocala violenta =

Species of moth

Catocala violenta is a moth of the family Erebidae. It is found from Colorado to Arizona, east to Texas and into Mexico.

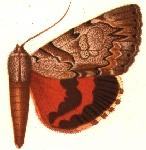
Illustration

The wingspan is 70–80 mm. Adults are on wing from July to August depending on the location. There is one generation per year.

The larvae feed on Quercus gambeli.
