= Double Adobe site =

Archaeological site in Arizona, United States

- Double Adobe Site
- U.S. National Register of Historic Places
- U.S. National Historic Landmark
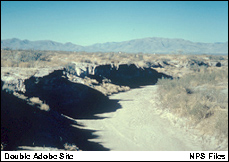

- Location within Arizona Location within the United States
- Nearest city: Douglas, Arizona
- Coordinates: 31°21′N 109°32′W
- NRHP reference No.: 66000169

Significant dates
- Added to NRHP: October 15, 1966
- Designated NHL: January 20, 1961

The Double Adobe Site is an archaeological site in southern Arizona, twelve miles northwest of Douglas in the Whitewater Draw area. In October 1926, just three months after the first human artifact was uncovered at the Folsom site, Byron Cummings, first Head of the Archaeology Department at the University of Arizona, led four students to Whitewater Draw. Discovered by a schoolboy, the Double Adobe Site contained the skull of a mammoth overlying a sand layer containing stone artifacts. One of these students was Emil Haury.

Later investigators found that the bones and artifacts were mixed by redeposited stream sediments, confusing the early interpretations. Fossil bones of mammoth, horse, bison, antelope, coyote and dire wolf were found associated with the artifacts, which included fire-cracked rock, projectile points, and small grinding stones.

The presence of grinding stones has been interpreted to mean that people were beginning to adapt to the changes brought by the end of the Ice Age and the extinction of many of the large mammals. The coming of the Holocene Era (10,000 years Before Present) brought warmer and drier conditions to the Southwest. As a result, by 11,000-10,500 BP the Clovis culture was beginning to give way to more regional variants, which are generally called the Archaic cultures.

E. B. Sayles' and E. Antevs' 1941 definition of the Cochise culture (the name given to the southern Archaic tradition in the Southwest) was based upon excavations undertaken within the Double Adobe district. Many of the Southwest's most respected archaeologists have led investigations in the region over the years. Double Adobe has yielded important information on southern Arizona's prehistoric climate, ecology, and animal life.

The Double Adobe Site was declared a National Historic Landmark in 1961.
