= Fort Rucker, Arizona =

Former US Army post in Cochise County

Coordinates: 31°45′05″N 109°23′02″W

Fort Rucker
- Rucker Canyon, Arizona, US
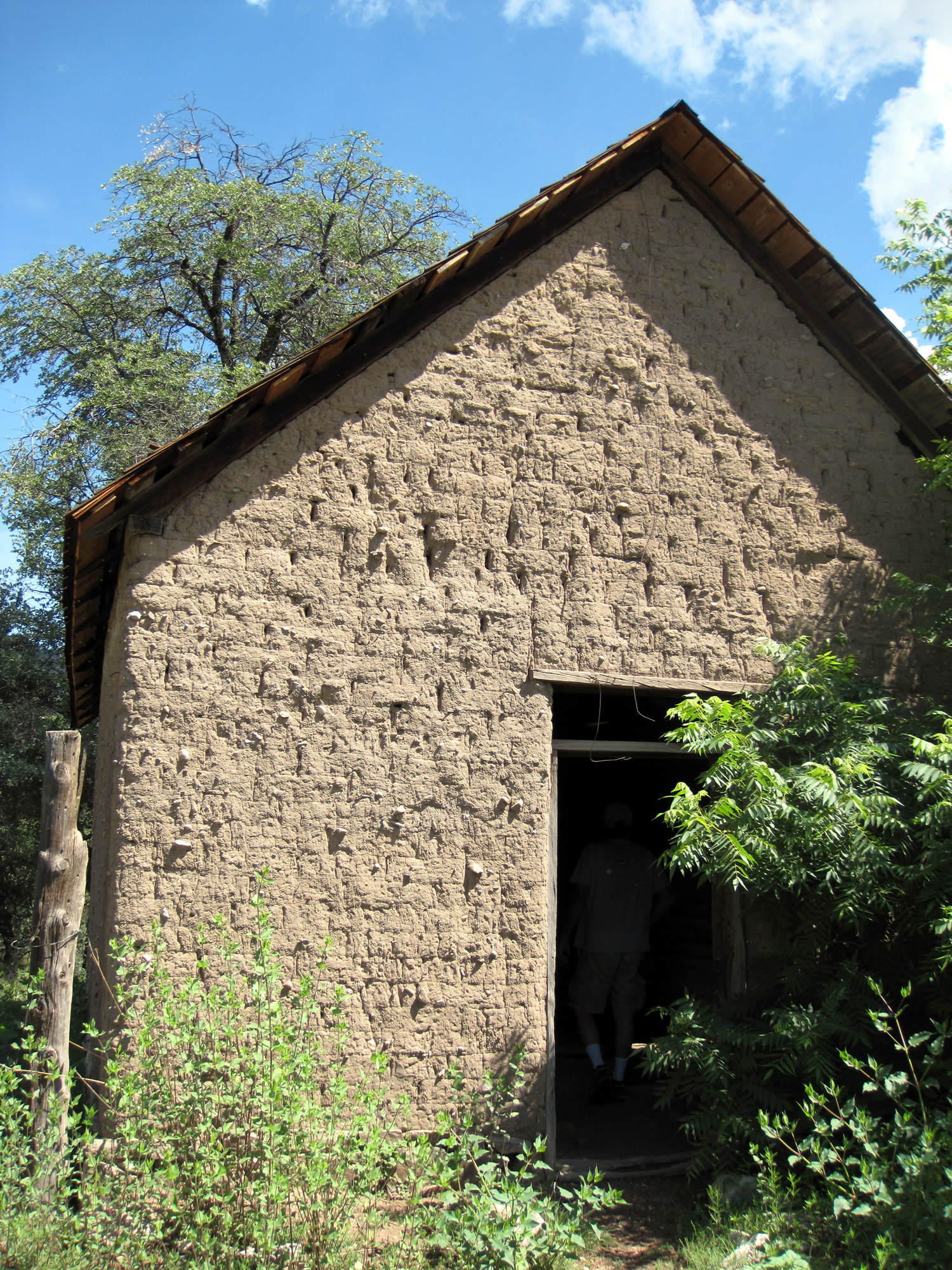
- Camp rucker

Site information
- Type: fortification
- Controlled by: Arizona
- Condition: tourist attraction

Site history
- Built: 1878
- Built by: United States
- In use: 1878–1890
- Battles/wars: Apache Wars

Garrison information
- Occupants: United States Army

Fort Rucker, or Camp Rucker, is a former United States Army post in Cochise County, Arizona. First known as Camp Supply and Camp Powers, its name was changed on October 1, 1878, in honor of Lieutenant John Anthony "Tony" Rucker. On July 11, 1878, Lieutenant Rucker died in an unsuccessful attempt to save the life of a fellow soldier, Lieutenant Austin Henley, when the two tried to cross a nearby river which had swelled following a rainstorm.

== History ==
The camp was initially built to protect settlers in the area, and also housed mounted cavalry units.

On July 21, 1880, six mules were stolen from the Camp Rucker stables, allegedly by William "Curly Bill" Brocius and two others alleged to be Ike Clanton and Calico Jones. The mules were later discovered on the ranch of Tom and Frank McLaury after a search by Lieutenant J. H. Hurst, Virgil Earp, and Earp's deputies.

During the 1880s, Camp Rucker became Fort Rucker. It was one of the more important military stations in the campaign against the Apache tribes led by Geronimo and Cochise. A small community grew up around the fort, as the military method of obtaining necessary supplies was through civilian contractors. It was abandoned by 1890.

The remnants of Camp Rucker are located on United States Forest Service land today. Officers' quarters, a bunkhouse, a sheltered latrine, a commissary warehouse, and a bakery are still standing. The site is adjacent to the south side of the Chiricahua Wilderness in the Douglas Ranger District of the Coronado National Forest; walk-in public access is permitted. Rucker Canyon and Rucker Lake are sites of popular Forest Service campgrounds, and in the summer a firefighting crew is stationed at a nearby administrative site.
