= Rucker Canyon =

Landform in Cochise County, Arizona

Coordinates: 31.752872°N 109.4297869°W

Rucker Canyon is a major canyon draining the western central-south of the Chiricahua Mountains, the central landform of the eastern third of Cochise County, Arizona's extreme southeast, bordering southwest New Mexico. It is famous for historic Camp Rucker.

The canyon contains Rucker Creek, (Rucker Wash), and upstream closer to the headwaters, the small Rucker Lake. Rucker Creek supposedly holds trout in the higher elevations. Different species of creek chub have also been known to inhabit the area. The wash drains into the southern region of the slightly north-west by due south Sulphur Springs Valley, east of north–south running U.S. Route 191 and the small communities of Elfrida, McNeal, and Sunizona. The Rucker Wash drains westwards toward the Sulphur Springs Valley and borders the northern small Swisshelm Mountains traversing the named Whitewater Draw of Rucker Creek.

The Rucker Wash is near a water divide. The Swisshelm Mountains are adjacent the southern border of the Sulphur Springs Valley, with Rucker Wash draining north towards the Willcox Playa, and drainage south toward Douglas, Arizona and Mexico

Rucker Lake was buried under sediment decades ago and no longer exists. As a direct result of the 1994 Rattlesnake Fire, "post-fire runoff deposited large amounts of sediment in lower channels, particularly in Rucker Creek and in Rucker Lake."

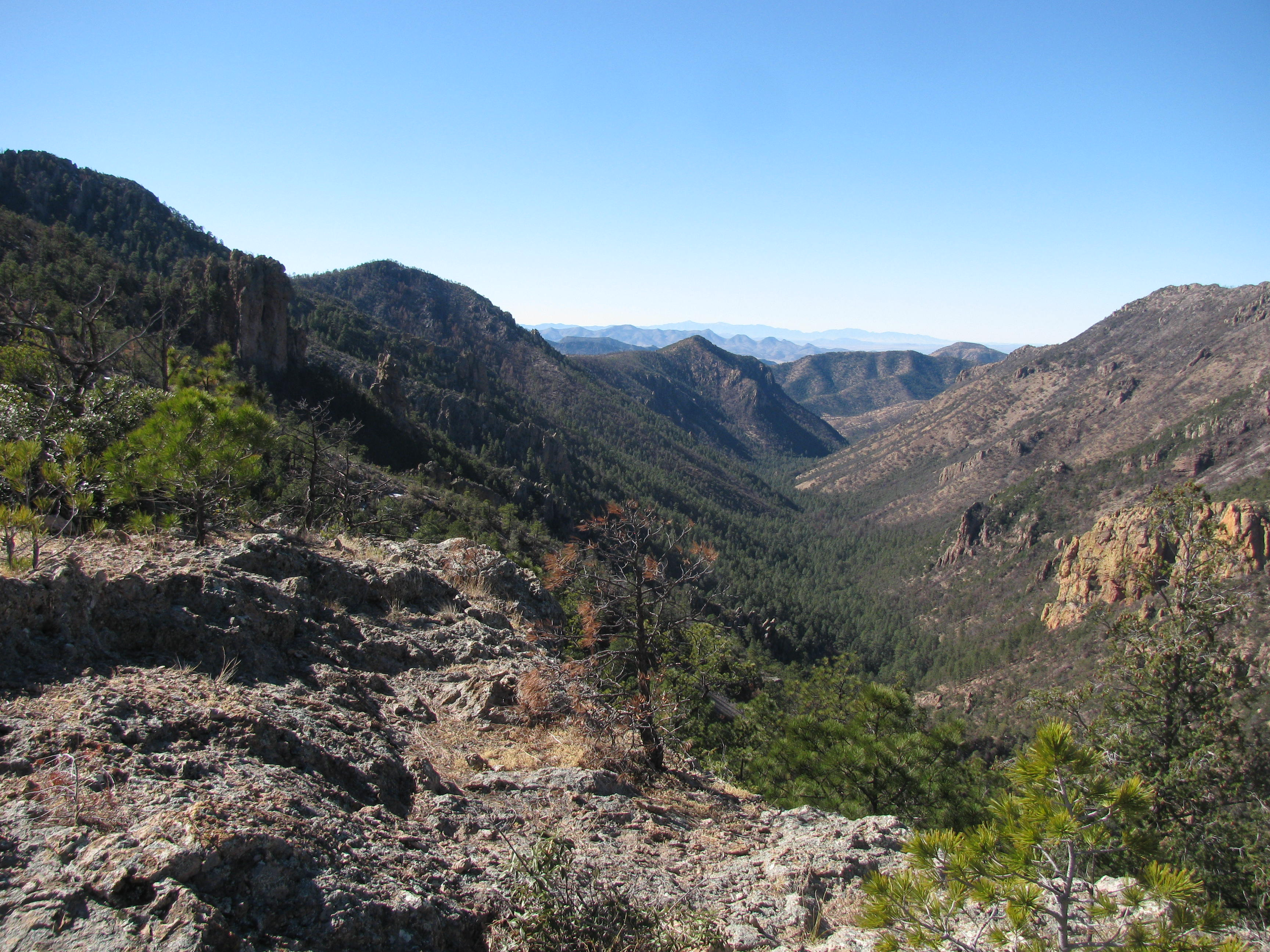
Rucker Canyon
