= Reuben F. Bernard =

US Army brigadier general (1832–1903)

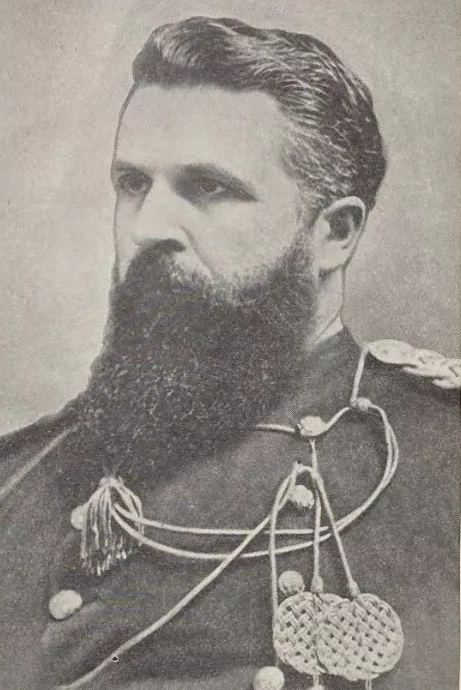
- Bernard as a captain, c. 1878
- Born: October 14, 1832; Hawkins County, Tennessee, US
- Died: November 17, 1903 (aged 71); Washington, D.C., US
- Burial place: Arlington National Cemetery
- Spouse(s): Alice Virginia Frank (m. 1866–1891) Ruth Lavinia Simpson (m. 1892–1892) Eliza Mae Camp (m. 1898–1903)
- Children: 6
- Relatives: Beaumont B. Buck (son-in-law)
- Military career
- Allegiance: United States; Union (American Civil War)
- Service: United States Army; Union Army
- Service years: 1855–1861, 1865–1896 (US Army); 1861–1865 (Union Army)
- Rank: Lieutenant Colonel (Army); Brigadier General (Brevet)
- Unit: US Army Cavalry Branch
- Commands: Company I, 1st Cavalry Regiment; Company G, 1st Cavalry Regiment
- Wars: American Civil War; American Indian Wars
- Other work: Deputy Governor, U.S. Soldiers' Home

Reuben Frank Bernard (October 14, 1832 – November 17, 1903) was a career officer in the United States Army. A veteran of the American Civil War and the American Indian Wars, he served from 1855 to 1896. Bernard attained the rank of lieutenant colonel during his career and was promoted to brigadier general by brevet in recognition of heroism and sustained superior service. After retiring, Bernard was appointed deputy governor of the U.S. Soldiers' Home.

== Early life ==
Reuben F. Bernard was born in the Van Hill hamlet of Hawkins County, Tennessee, the second of twelve children born to John Bernard and Mary (Morelock) Bernard. He was raised and educated in Van Hill, then worked on his family's farm, where he assisted in raising crops including corn and tobacco, in addition to working as a blacksmith. In 1854, he left home for Knoxville, where he enhanced his metalworking and horsemanship skills while working for a local blacksmith.

In February 1855, Bernard enlisted as a private in the United States Army. Assigned to the 1st Regiment of Dragoons, he spent several months on garrison duty in Missouri and Kansas. In September 1855, he was with the 1st Dragoons' Company D when it was posted to Fort Craig, New Mexico Territory. Because of his metalworking background, his commander assigned Bernard the additional duty of company blacksmith.

== Early career ==
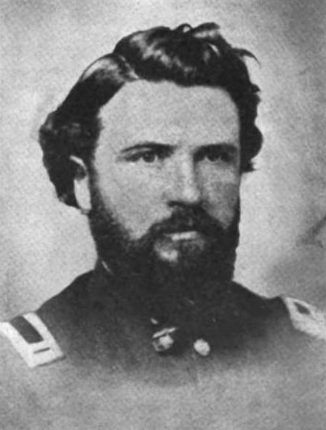
Bernard as a first lieutenant in 1864

In early 1856, Bernard took part in his regiment's expedition against members of the Chiricahua people who were accused of livestock thefts. In the summer of 1856, Bernard's company was assigned to duty near Tucson, Arizona Territory. Bernard was subsequently promoted to corporal, and Company D remained in Arizona until 1859, where its duties included protecting mail carriers, pursuing outlaws, and taking part in expeditions against the Pinal and Arvaipa bands of Apache people. His career continued to progress, and he received promotion to sergeant.

In March 1859, D Company returned to New Mexico and was posted to Fort Fillmore, where Bernard was promoted to company first sergeant. In the summer of 1860, he reenlisted at Fort Buchanan, Arizona, after which he took leave and traveled home to Tennessee. In early 1861, he returned to Arizona, and in February he was part of a relief force that came to the aid of George Nicholas Bascom following the Bascom affair.

In April 1861, the 1st Dragoons were reorganized as the 1st Cavalry Regiment. Companies D and G were assigned to duty in New Mexico, and Bernard was appointed acting second lieutenant of Company D. In 1861 and 1862, Bernard took part in American Civil War battles as part of the Union Army's Department of New Mexico, which was commanded by Edward Canby. Canby's forces opposed Confederate States Army forces under Henry Hopkins Sibley, who attempted to open a supply route from Texas to California while also attempting to appropriate gold from mines in New Mexico and Colorado. In July 1862, Bernard received his commission as a second lieutenant of Cavalry.

== Continued career ==
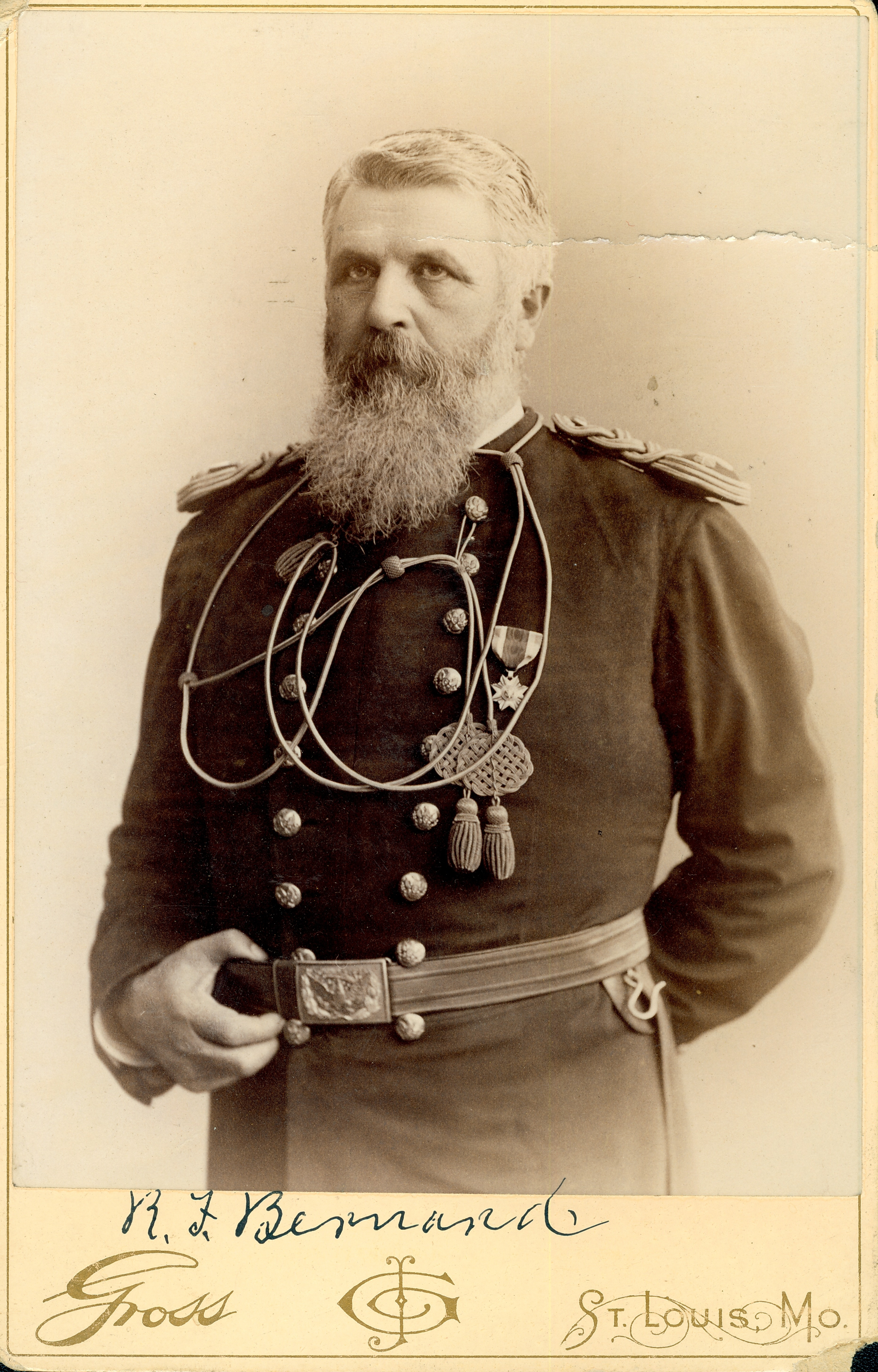
Bernard as a major, circa 1882

In the summer of 1863, Bernard was promoted to first lieutenant and traveled with his company to Carlisle, Pennsylvania, where it arrived shortly after the Battle of Gettysburg. In October, the 1st Cavalry joined the Army of the Potomac at Camp Buford, Maryland. Assigned to Company I, Bernard served in Maryland and Virginia until the end of the war in 1865 and took part in over 60 skirmishes, and battles, including the Battle of the Wilderness, Battle of Spotsylvania Court House, Battle of Cold Harbor, Third Battle of Winchester, Battle of Smithfield, Battle of Five Forks, Battle of Sailor's Creek, and Battle of Yellow Tavern. During these engagements, he served at different times as regimental quartermaster and commander of Company I. He was wounded at the Battle of Todd's Tavern, and received several brevet promotions for heroism, including captain on 6 May 1864 for Todd's Tavern, major on 28 August 1864 for Smithfield, and lieutenant colonel and colonel to date from 13 March 1865 for heroism and commendable service throughout the war. The 1st Cavalry was part of the force that cut off the final Confederate effort to break through Union lines at Appomattox Court House, and he was present for the Army of Northern Virginia's surrender on 9 April 1865.

Bernard continued his military career after the Civil War, primarily in the western United States, where he took part in several campaigns of the American Indian Wars. He was promoted to captain in July 1866, and assigned to command the 1st Cavalry's Company G. He served in Arizona, California, and Oregon between 1866 and 1881, including the Nez Perce War and Bannock War. He was promoted to major in the 8th Cavalry Regiment in November 1882. In February 1886, a gun battle between competing political factions took place in Laredo, Texas. Bernard led two companies of the 16th Infantry Regiment from Fort McIntosh to Laredo, where the troops succeeded in restoring order.

On 27 February 1890, Bernard received a promotion to brigadier general by brevet in recognition of heroism at the Battle of Chiricahua Pass in February 1869, the Battle of Silver Creek, Oregon in June 1878, and Birch Creek, Oregon in July 1878. In July 1892, he was promoted to lieutenant colonel of the 9th Cavalry Regiment. Bernard left the army upon reaching the mandatory retirement age of 64 in October 1896. After his retirement from the military, Bernard served as deputy governor of the U.S. Soldiers' Home in Washington, D.C.

Bernard's memberships included the Military Order of the Loyal Legion of the United States and the Order of the Indian Wars of the United States. He died in Washington, D.C. on 17 November 1903. He was buried at Arlington National Cemetery. Bernard was the subject of a biography, 1936's One Hundred and Three Fights and Scrimmages: The Story of Reuben F. Bernard by Don Russell, which was republished in 2003.

== Family ==
In 1866, Bernard married Alice Virginia Frank. She died in 1891, and in 1892 he married Ruth Lavinia Simpson. She died later in 1892, and in 1898 he married Eliza Mae Camp.

With his first wife, Bernard was the father of six children: Harry, Kate, John, Mary, George, and Thomas. Kate Bernard was the wife of army general Beaumont B. Buck.
