= Chiricahua Mountains =

Mountain range in Arizona, United States

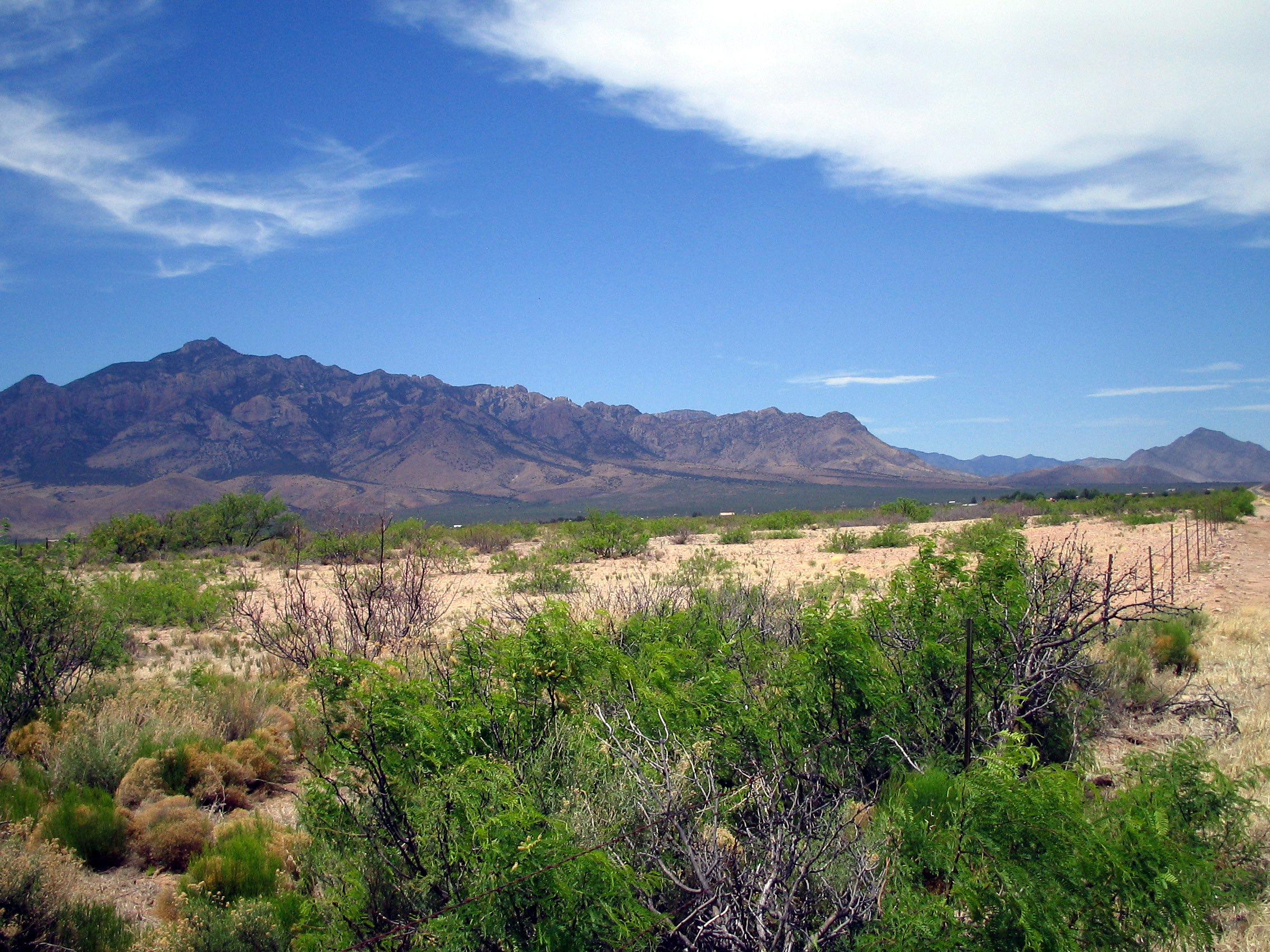
- Chiricahua Mountains – northeast flank (from Portal, Arizona)

Highest point
- Peak: Chiricahua Peak
- Elevation: 9,759 ft (2,975 m)
- Coordinates: 31°50′47″N 109°17′28″W

Dimensions
- Length: 35 mi (56 km) NW, then SW
- Width: 21 mi (34 km) (arc-shape)-N-S

Geography
- Location within Arizona
- Country: United States
- State: Arizona
- Regions: Madrean Sky Islands; Sonoran Desert; Chihuahuan Desert
- County: Cochise
- Communities: Willcox; Douglas; Rodeo; Portal
- Range coordinates: 31°55′47″N 109°22′56″W
- Borders on: Dos Cabezas Mountains; San Simon Valley; San Bernardino Valley; Pedregosa Mountains; Sulphur Springs Valley

The Chiricahuas is a mountain range in southeastern Arizona and part of the Basin and Range province of the western and southwestern United States and northwestern Mexico. The range lies primarily within the Coronado National Forest. Chiricahua Peak, the highest point in the range, rises 9,759 feet (2,975 m) above sea level, about 6,000 feet (1,800 m) above the surrounding valleys. The mountains are named for the Chiricahua Apache, who historically lived in the region.

== Geographic setting ==
The Chiricahua Mountains are a large mountain range in southeastern Arizona and part of the Basin and Range province of the western and southwestern United States and northwestern Mexico. The range occupies the eastern half of Cochise County and is largely managed within the Coronado National Forest.

Rising from surrounding valleys at about 3,600 feet (1,100 m), the range reaches its highest point at Chiricahua Peak, which stands 9,759 feet (2,975 m) above sea level, an elevation gain of roughly 6,000 feet (1,800 m). Sulphur Springs Valley lies to the west and the San Simon Valley to the east. The Pedregosa Mountains border the southern end of the range, while the Swisshelm Mountains lie to the southwest. To the northwest, the range continues as the Dos Cabezas Mountains beyond Apache Pass and the Fort Bowie National Historic Site.

Access to the range is primarily via Willcox to the north, Douglas to the south, and Rodeo to the east. About 87,700 acres (35,500 ha) of the range are protected as the Chiricahua Wilderness. On the east side, Cave Creek Canyon includes the communities of Portal and Paradise and the American Museum of Natural History Southwest Research Station.

== History ==
The earliest evidence of humans in the vicinity of the Chiricahua Mountains are Clovis archeological sites such as Double Adobe Site in the Whitewater Draw tributary of Rucker Creek north of Douglas. Subsequently, the Cochise culture another pre-ceramic based culture spanning 3000–200 BCE was defined from sites around the Chiricahua Mountains, including Cave Creek Canyon.

Following the transition to ceramics, artifacts characteristic of both Mogollon culture and its local variants, the Mimbres culture, are found. These relics span the period from 150 BCE – 1450. The influx of other indigenous peoples, such as the Chiricahua Apaches, including the leaders Cochise and Geronimo occupied the area until forced removal in the late 19th century.

The name Chiricahua is believed to originate from the Opata name for the mountains, Chiwi Kawi, meaning "Turkey Mountain". Historically, wild turkeys were often found in the region.

The first recorded mining claim in the Chiricahua Mountains was the Hidden Treasure claim filed in 1881, and mining has continued intermittently to the present with the greatest periods of activity occurring in the 1920s and 1950s.

More recently, the Chiricahuas have fallen into use by people smugglers and drug cartels, who position lookouts on their peaks to warn of Border Patrol activities.

== Geology overview ==
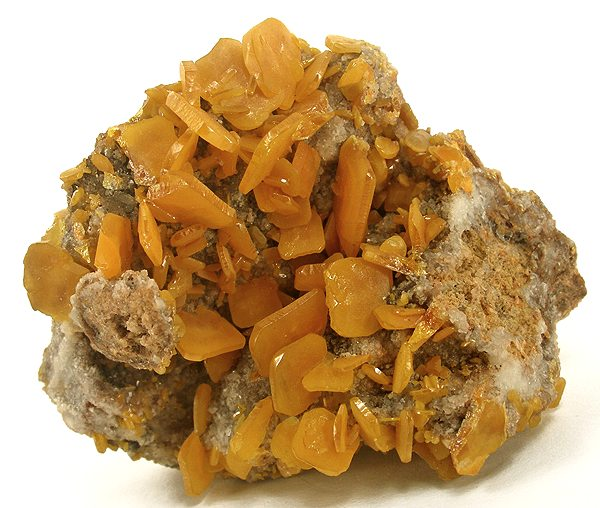
Wulfenite specimen from the old Hilltop Mine, Rustler Park

The Chiricahua Mountains are an uplifted structural block of the Basin and Range. The mountains contain Precambrian basement rocks, Paleozoic and Cretaceous sedimentary rocks around a caldera complex formed by volcanic eruptions and intrusions 35–25 million years ago. The last major eruption, 27 million years ago, created the Turkey Creek Caldera and laid down 2,000 feet (610 m) of volcanic ash which fused into welded rhyolite tuff. Subsequent erosion has created mountain ridges covered in stone spires and stone columns, hoodoos, that rise up out of the forest. These natural features, preserved in the Chiricahua National Park, are composed of Rhyolite Canyon Tuff.

A one to two mile wide band of sedimentary rock running southeast to northwest from south of Portal through Paradise and up to the Dos Cabezas Mountains is the source of mineralized deposits. The largest of the mines developed in the California district of the Chiricahua Mountains was the Hilltop mine which consisted of 3 interconnected levels totaling 6,098 metres (20,007 ft).

== Flora and fauna ==
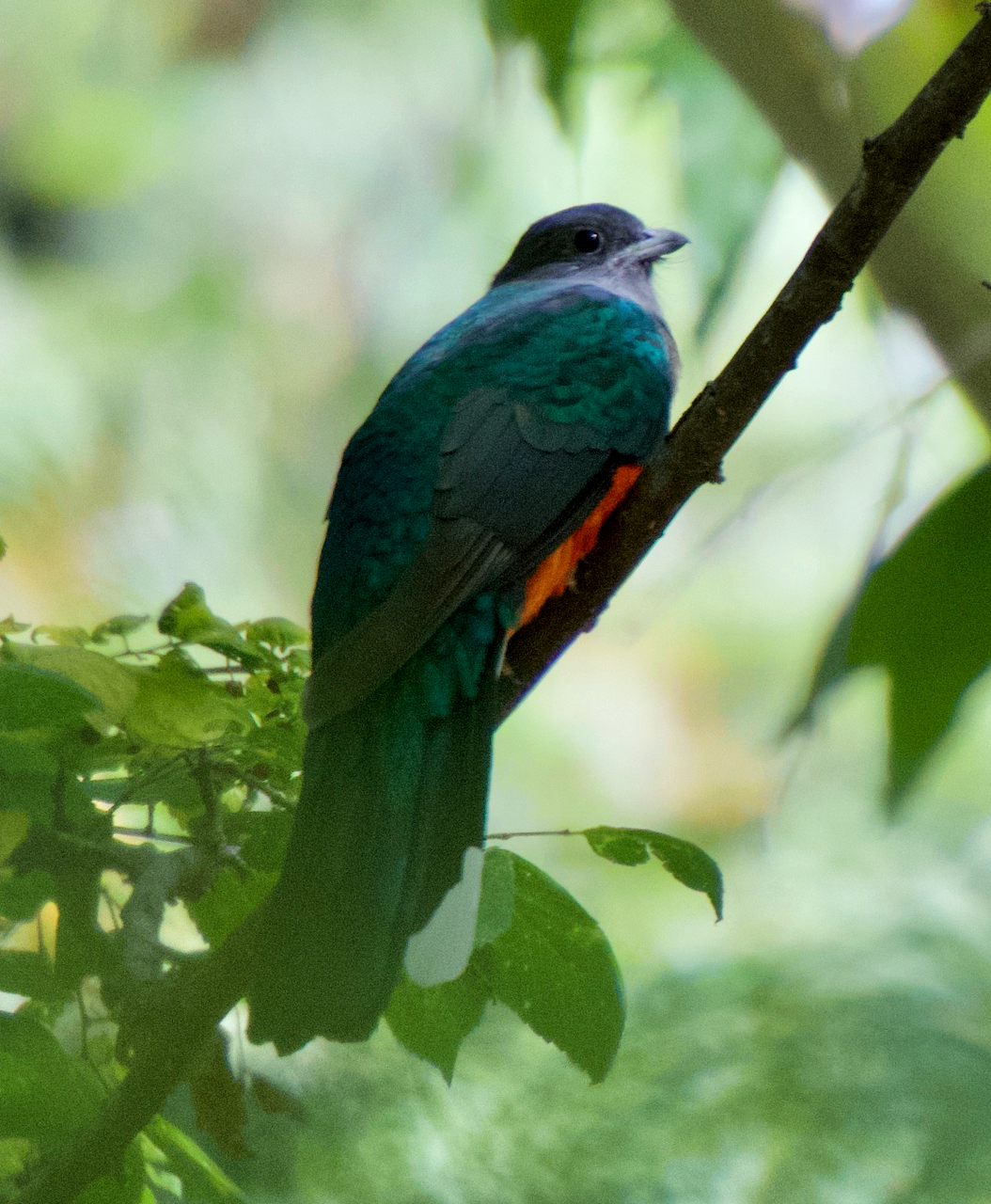
A male eared quetzal in the Chiricahua Mountains.

The Chiricahua Mountains are a bio-diverse area which is composed of numerous sky islands. Five of the 9 life zones are found in the Chiricahua Mountains. Three hundred and seventy-five avian species have been recorded from the Chiricahua Mountains; some are largely Mexican species for which southern Arizona is the northern limits of their ranges. Other animals of note include ocelots, jaguars, mountain lions, black bears, and white-tailed deer. Of note is that perhaps the last remaining jaguar in the United States is found here, a male named Sombra by wildlife officials.

Grasslands and desert cover the base of the range, with ponderosa pine and Douglas fir at the highest elevations.

=== Species associated with the range ===
- Arizona sycamore
- Catocala violenta (=Catocala chiricahua)
- Charadra tapa
- Chiricahua leopard frog
- Eared quetzal
- Elegant trogon
- Hypotrix lunata
- Johann's pinyon
- Lilium parryi
- Lithophane leeae
- Madrean pine-oak woodlands
- Rocky Mountain Douglas-fir
- Tricholita ferrisi– ((?) found only at Onion Saddle)

== Gallery ==
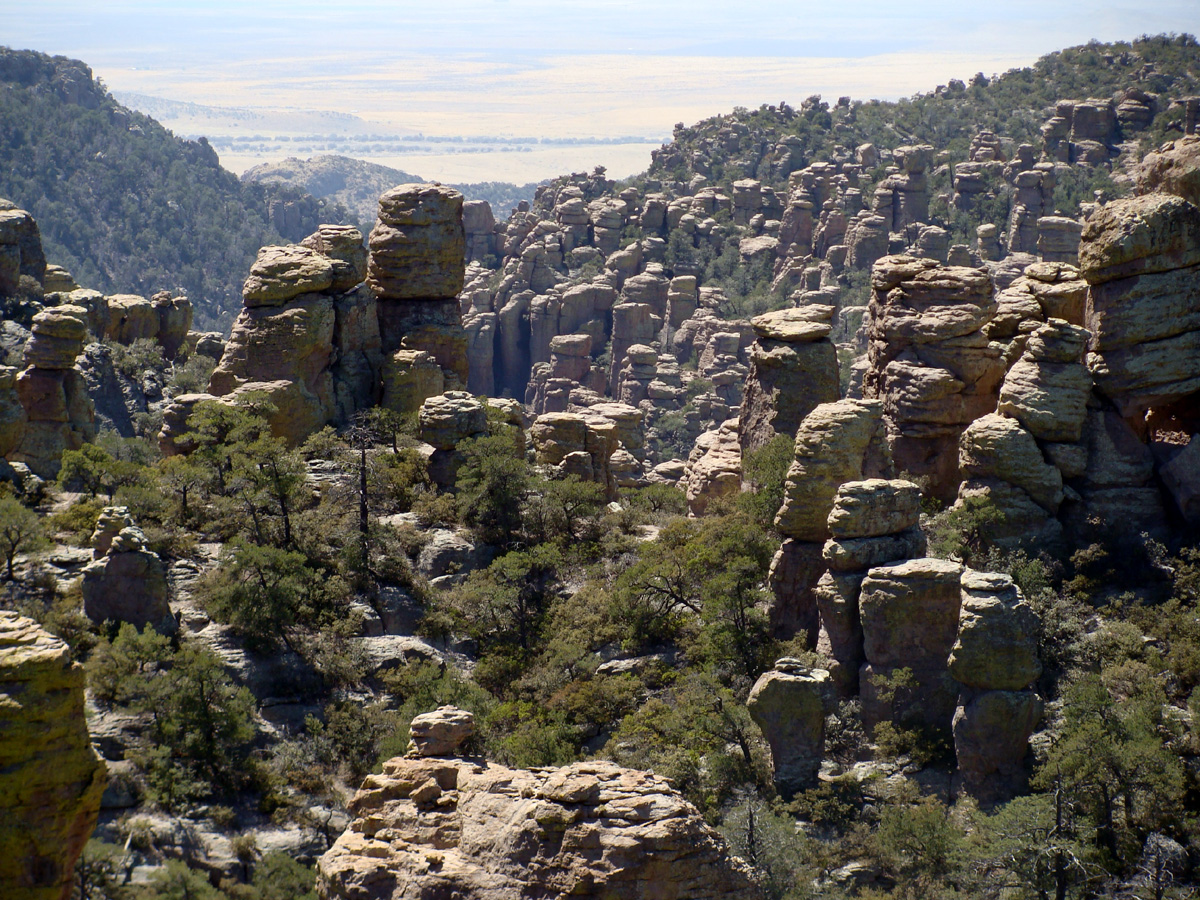
Chiricahua National Park

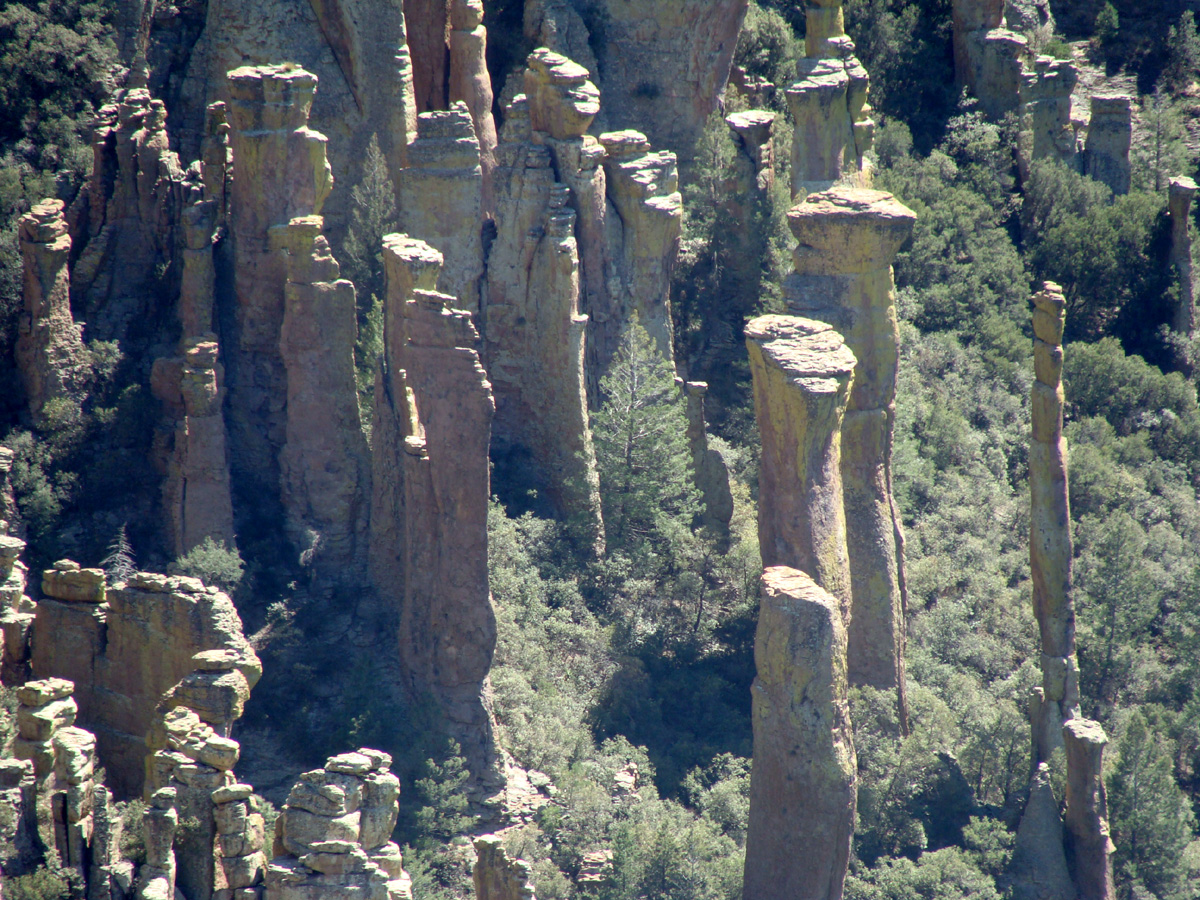
Hoodoos, Chiricahua National Park

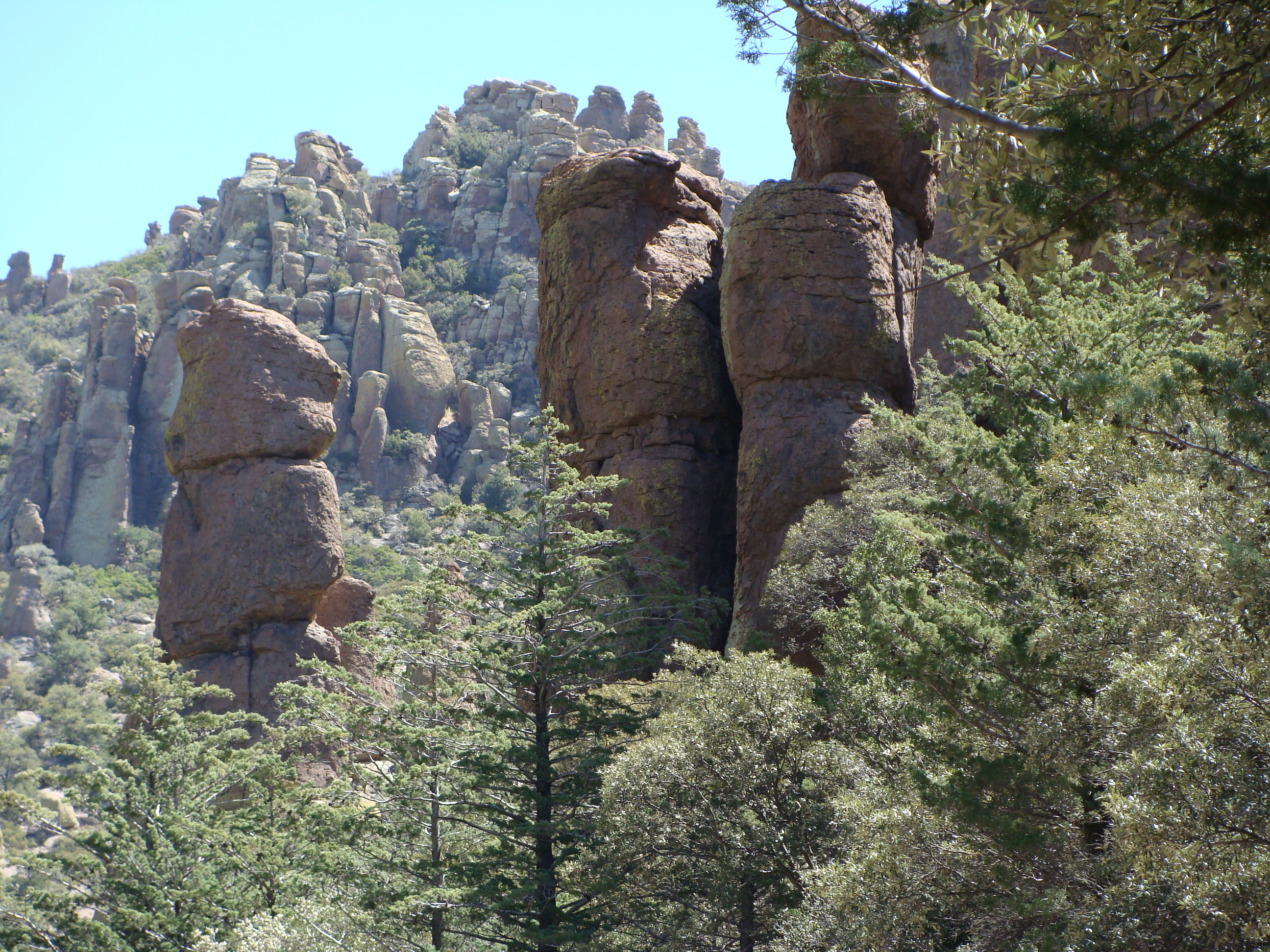
Trees and hoodoos, Chiricahua National Park

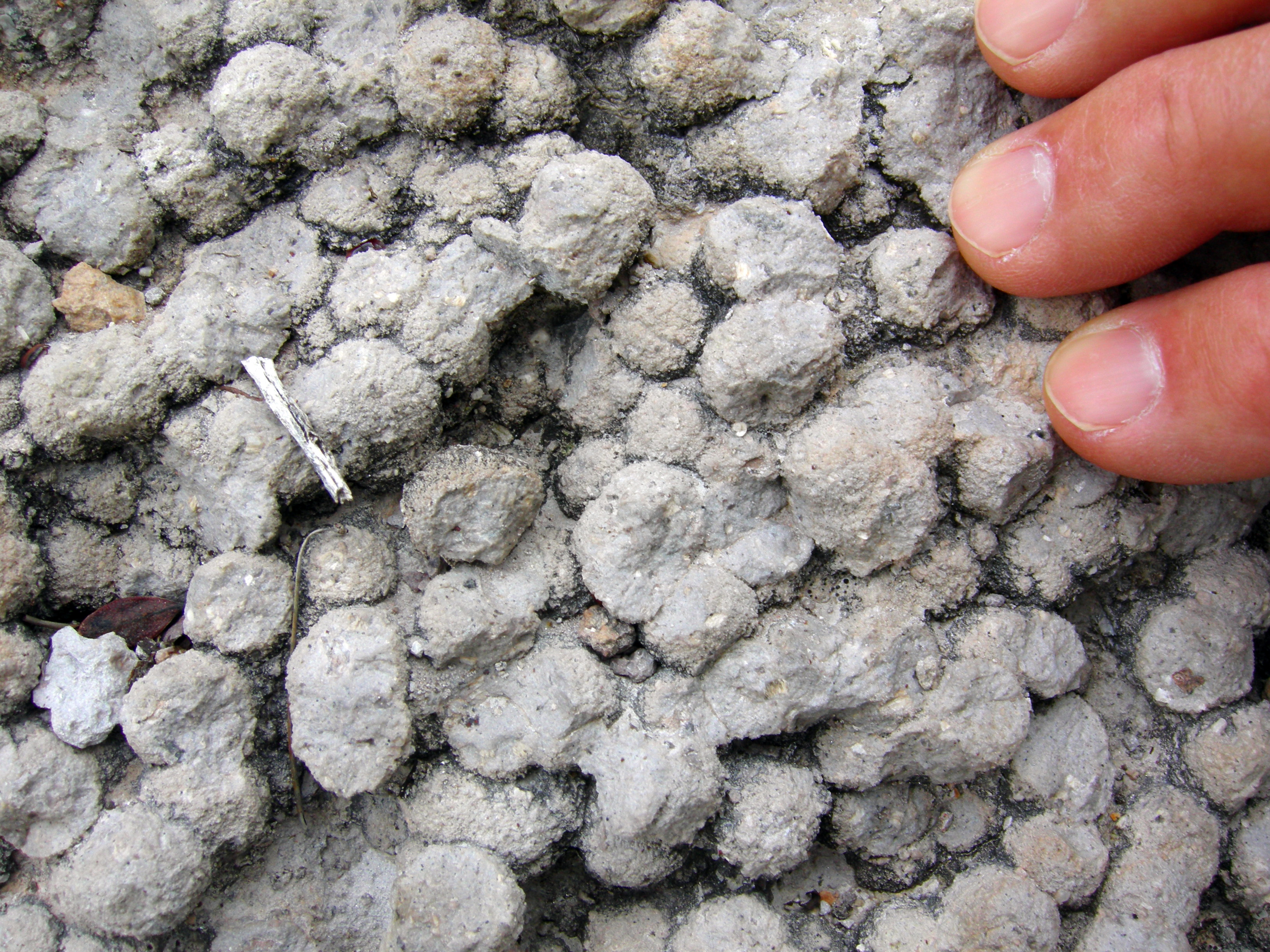
Spherulites

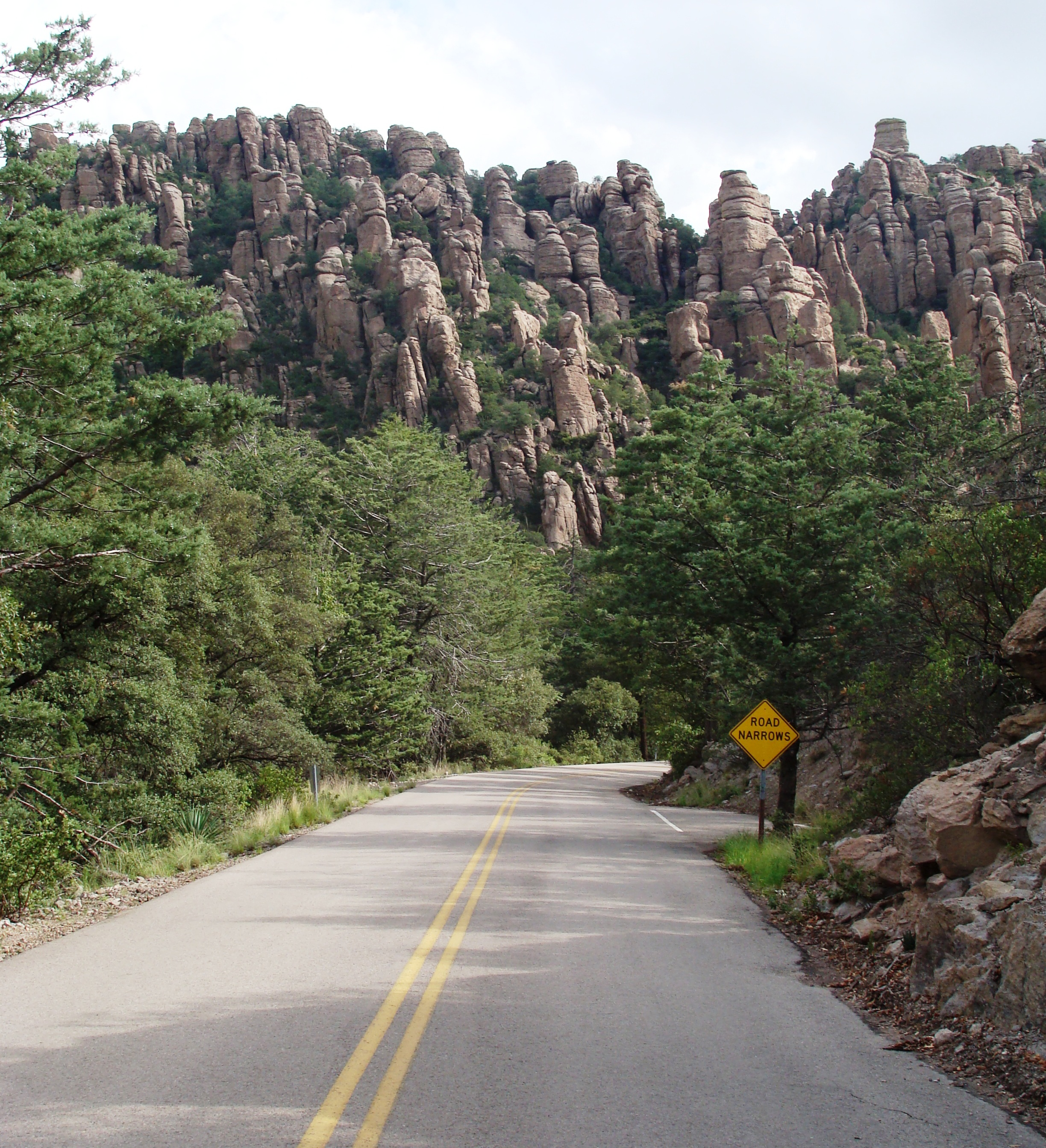
Road to Chiricahua National Park

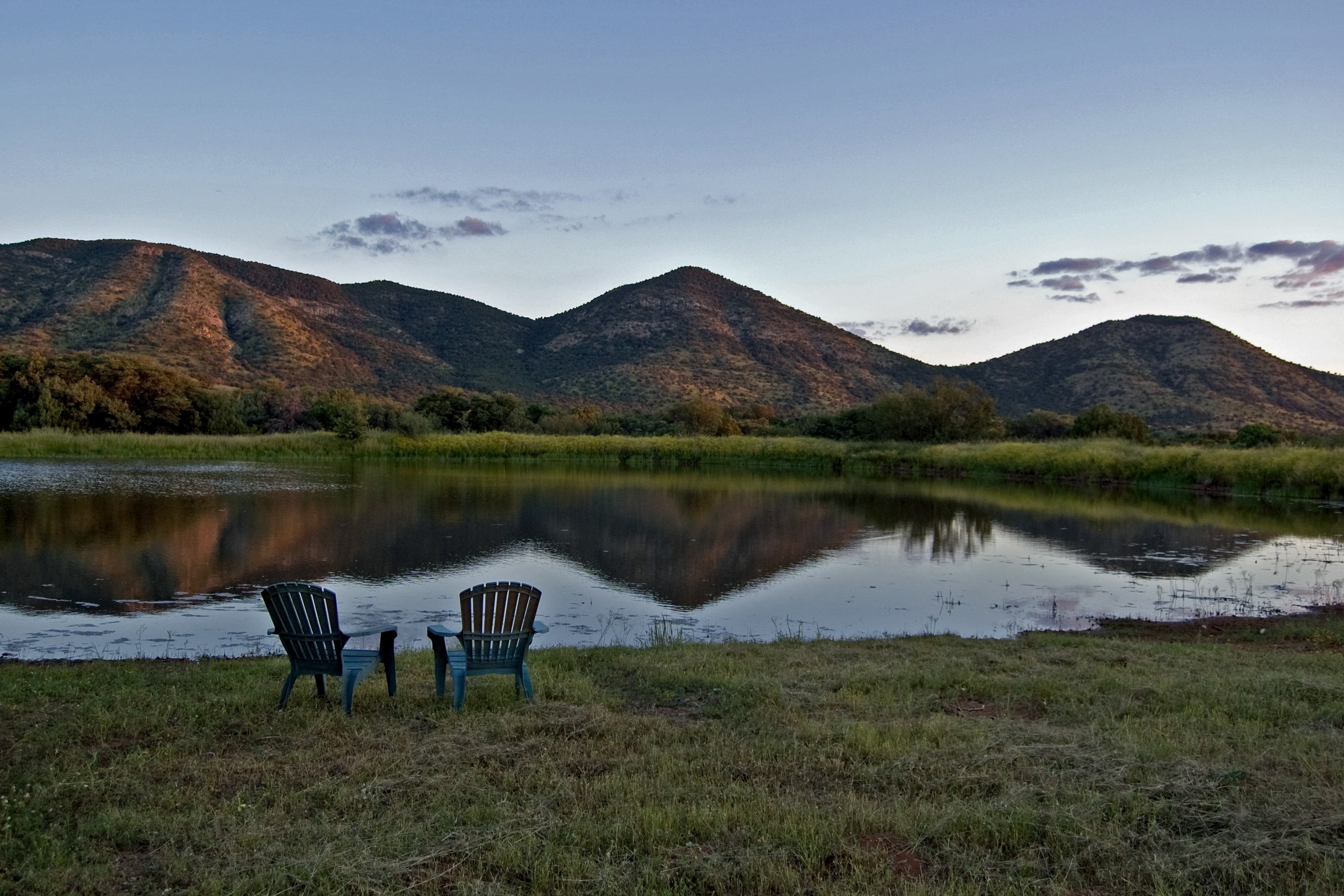
Sunglow Ranch

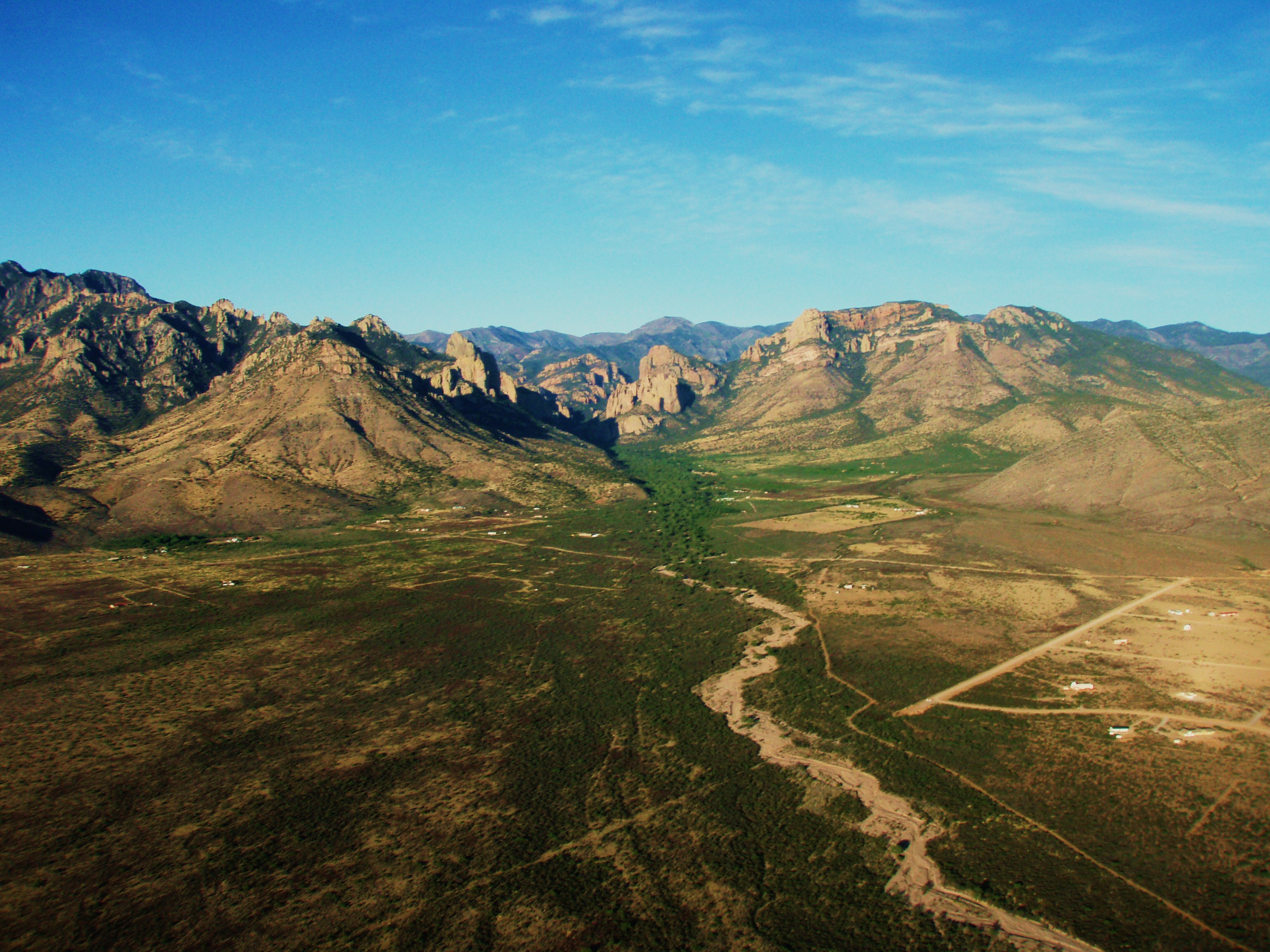
Cave Creek Canyon

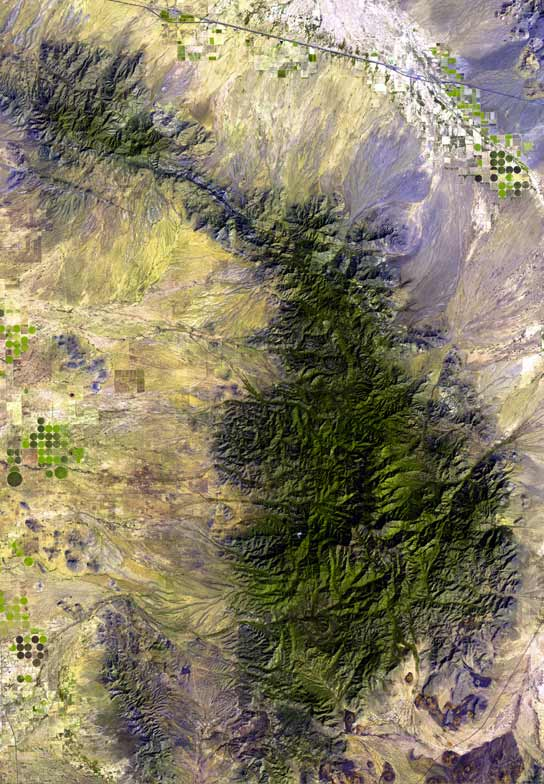
Chiricahua Mountain Range (massif), and its sub-Ranges, with the bordering valleys.

== See also ==
- Chiricahua National Park
- Dos Cabezas Mountains
- Shootout at Wilson Ranch
- Gleeson Gunfight
