= Miramar National Cemetery =

Veterans cemetery in San Diego County, California

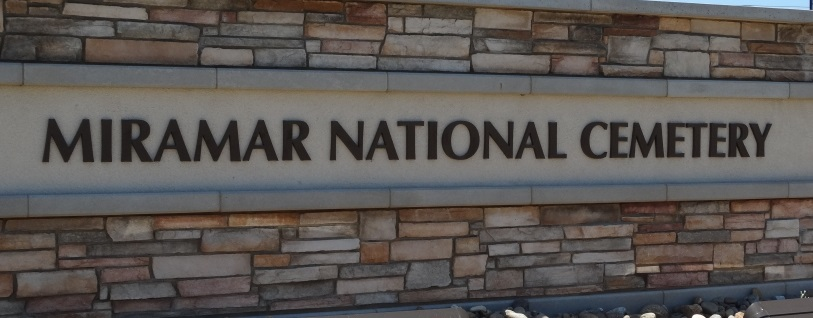
- Miramar National Cemetery entrance wall
- Interactive map of Miramar National Cemetery

Details
- Established: 2010
- Location: 5795 Nobel Dr, San Diego, California 92122
- Country: United States
- Coordinates: 32°52′26″N 117°11′19″W
- Type: United States National Cemetery
- Size: 313 acres (127 ha)
- No. of interments: >23,000
- Website: cem.va.gov/mnc
- Find a Grave: Miramar National Cemetery
- Footnotes: Nationwide Gravesite Locator (USDVA)

Miramar National Cemetery is a federal military cemetery in San Diego, California. It is located in the northwest corner of Marine Corps Air Station Miramar on the grounds of former Camp Kearny (1917) and Camp Elliott (1942). The cemetery is considered an auxiliary of Fort Rosecrans National Cemetery and is administered by the United States Department of Veterans Affairs.

== History ==
On 30 January 2010, the Department of Veterans Affairs dedicated a new National Cemetery at the northwest corner of MCAS Miramar. The cemetery is an extension of Fort Rosecrans National Cemetery and when complete will accommodate the remains of approximately 235,000 veterans and spouses. Nearby Fort Rosecrans Cemetery closed to most casket burials in 1966, and prior to Miramar's opening, the only option for casket burials of San Diego region veterans was Riverside National Cemetery.

The cemetery design is sensitive to environmental considerations, preserving habitat for endangered California gnatcatchers and fairy shrimp.

The first interment occurred in November 2010; the first casket burial occurred in April 2011.

The cemetery contains 313 acres dedicated for full casket burials and cremated remains. It has 16 designated areas (not all currently being used) for full casket burials and two columbarium areas for urn interments. It also has two, "Committal Service Shelters" or open sided covered shelters. North of the central "Avenue of Flags" is a "Memorial Walk" with dedications and benches for reflections. A planned Ossuary is located at the end of the "Memorial Walk" and designated as the "Memorial Plaza." The Administration Office has an interior service room and a unique funeral procession lane behind it. Near the entrance is a "P.O.W. Plaza" where the bronze memorial to prisoners of war called "Liberation" is located.

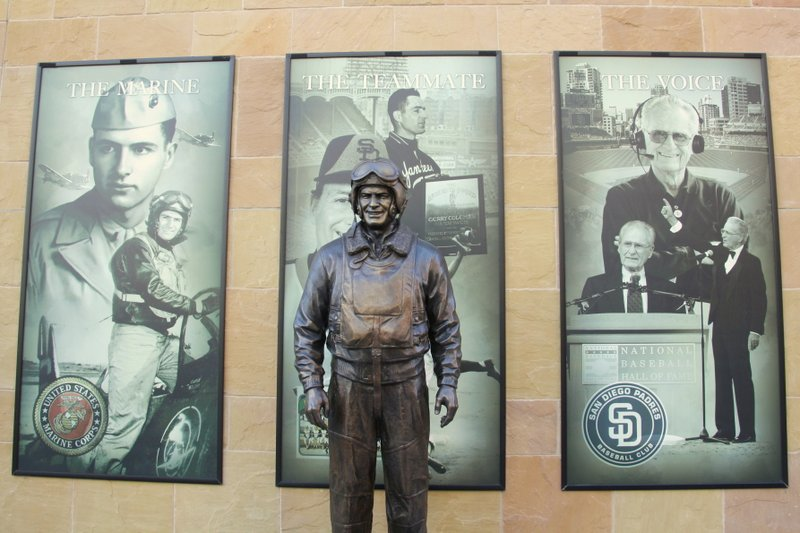
Statue of Coleman at Petco Park.

== Notable burials ==
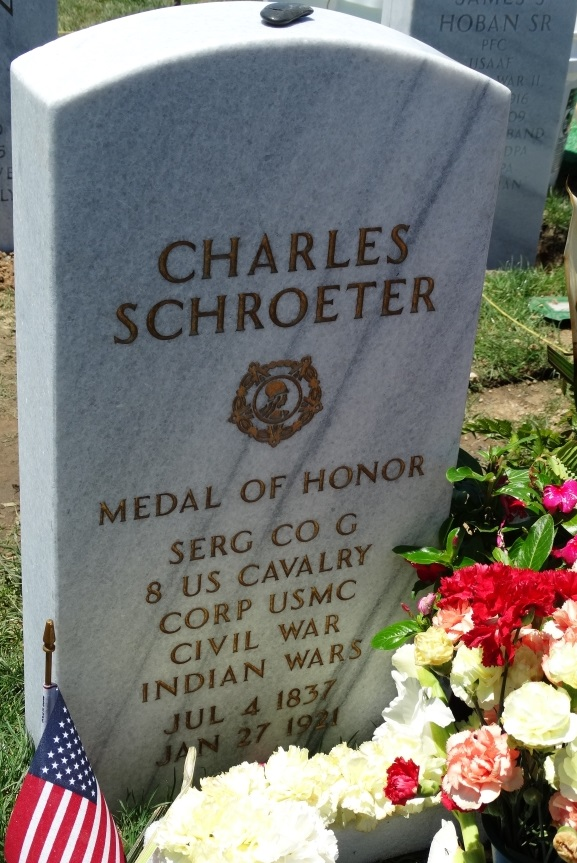
Grave marker of Charles Schroeter – Medal of Honor – Section 3-1052 – Miramar National Cemetery

=== Medal of Honor recipients ===
- Charles Schroeter (1837–1921), recipient from the American Civil War

=== Other burials ===
- Rudy Bukich (1930–2016), an American football player in the National Football League who played for fourteen seasons (1953 and 1956 to 1968). He served with the United States Army from 1954 to 1956.
- Jerry Coleman (1924–2014), a baseball broadcaster, a former manager of the San Diego Padres, a World Series winning Major League Baseball second baseman for the New York Yankees and a Marine Corps pilot during World War II and the Korean War.
- Tim LaHaye (1926–2016), an evangelical Protestant minister who wrote and co-wrote more than 85 books, both fiction and non-fiction, including the Left Behind series. He enlisted in the United States Army Air Forces in 1944, and served in the European Theater of Operations during World War II as a machine gunner aboard a bomber.
- Don Marshall (1934–2016), actor known for his role as Dan Erickson in the television show Land of the Giants. He enlisted and served in the US Army during the Korean War.
- Charlie Paulk (1946–2014) professional basketball player

== Eligibility ==
Burial in Miramar National Cemetery is available for eligible veterans, their spouses and dependents at no cost to the family and includes the gravesite, grave-liner, opening and closing of the grave, a headstone or marker, and perpetual care as part of a national shrine. For veterans, benefits may also include a burial flag (with case for active duty), and military funeral honors. Family members and other loved ones of deceased veterans may request Presidential Memorial Certificates.

Veterans discharged from active duty under conditions other than dishonorable and servicemembers who die while on active duty, active duty for training, or inactive duty training, as well as spouses and dependent children of veterans and active duty servicemembers, may be eligible for VA burial and memorial benefits including burial in a national cemetery. The veteran does not have to die before a spouse or dependent child can be eligible.

Reservists and National Guard members, as well as their spouses and dependent children, are eligible if they were entitled to retired pay at the time of death, or would have been upon reaching requisite age.

Burial of dependent children is limited to unmarried children under 21 years of age, or under 23 years of age if a full-time student at an approved educational institution. Unmarried adult children who become physically or mentally disabled and incapable of self-support before age 21, or age 23 if a full-time student, also are eligible for burial.

A Federal law passed in 2010 (Public Law 111-275) extends burial benefits to certain parents of servicemembers who die as a result of hostile activity or from combat training-related injuries who are buried in a national cemetery in a gravesite with available space. The biological or adopted parents of a servicemember who dies in combat or while performing training in preparation for a combat mission, leaving no surviving spouse or dependent child, may be buried with the deceased servicemember if the Secretary of Veterans Affairs determines that there is available space. The law applies to servicemembers who died on or after Oct. 7, 2001 and to parents who died on or after Oct. 13, 2010.

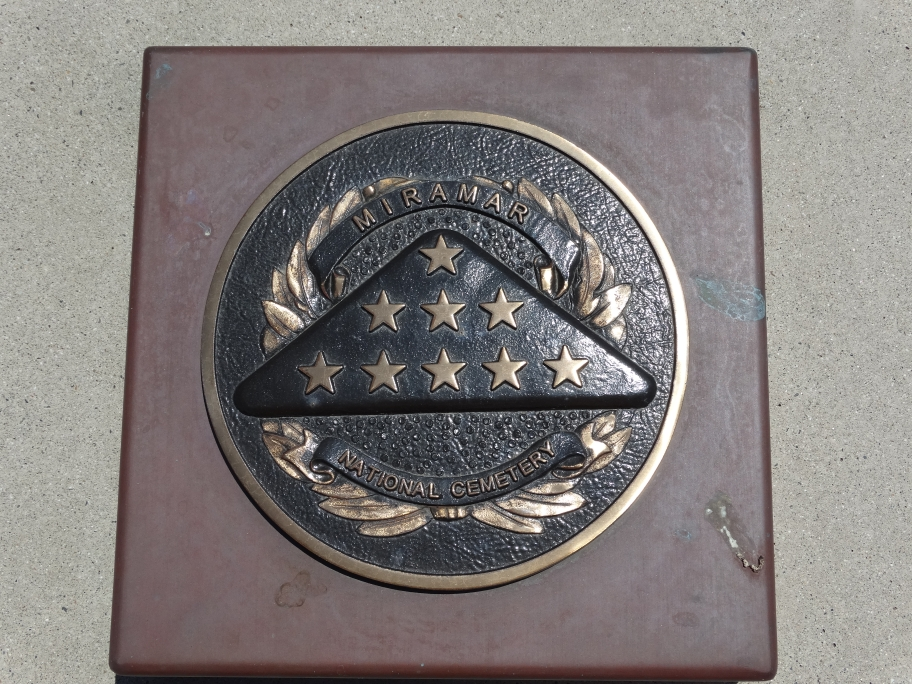
Miramar National Cemetery plaque – on the Memorial Walk at Miramar National Cemetery

== Monuments and memorials ==
Miramar National Cemetery has several memorials and monuments.

- The Liberation – by sculptor Richard Becker. It was dedicated on Sept. 16, 2011. It "honors the sacrifice of veterans captured during America's foreign wars." The San Diego American Ex-Prisoners of War-Chapter 1 provided "the 15-foot-tall figurative composition of a bronze soldier and POW flag atop a concrete base."

=== Memorial Walk ===
- Jewish War Veterans
- US Navy Seabees
- US Navy Nurse Corps
- Blue Star Memorial by the California Garden Club, Palomar District
- Korean War Memorial – Chosin Reservoir by the San Diego Chapter of the Chosin Few
- US Army Special Forces Memorial
- US Paratroopers "Airborne" Memorial – added March 201

=== Avenue of Flags ===
The Avenue of Flags contains fifty (50) steel flag poles with lighting to display all the American flags along the avenue twenty four (24) hours a day. The Avenue extends from near the cemetery entrance eastward toward a giant American flag and flagpole at the east end of the roadway at the Flag Assembly Area.

It was dedicated on Saturday 28 January 2012 with North San Diego County Supervisor Bill Horn, Officers of the United States Armed Forces, representatives of the Department of Veterans Affairs and numerous San Diego and Orange County veterans groups. It was hosted by the Fort Rosecrans and Miramar National Cemetery Support Foundation, a 501(c)(3) non-profit organization, with assistance from a US Marine Corps color guard and band from the 3rd Marine Aircraft Wing.

The Support Foundation takes care of flag replacement and repair. It was instrumental in the equipment, purchase and volunteer installation of the flagpoles with proper lighting. Volunteers provide about 1,000 hours of labor by digging trenches, assembling and landscaping. Noteworthy volunteers come from the Boy Scouts of America and Young Marines. They were joined by volunteers from the USS Ronald Reagan (CVN-76), Marine Corps Air Station Miramar and many civilians.

== Gallery ==
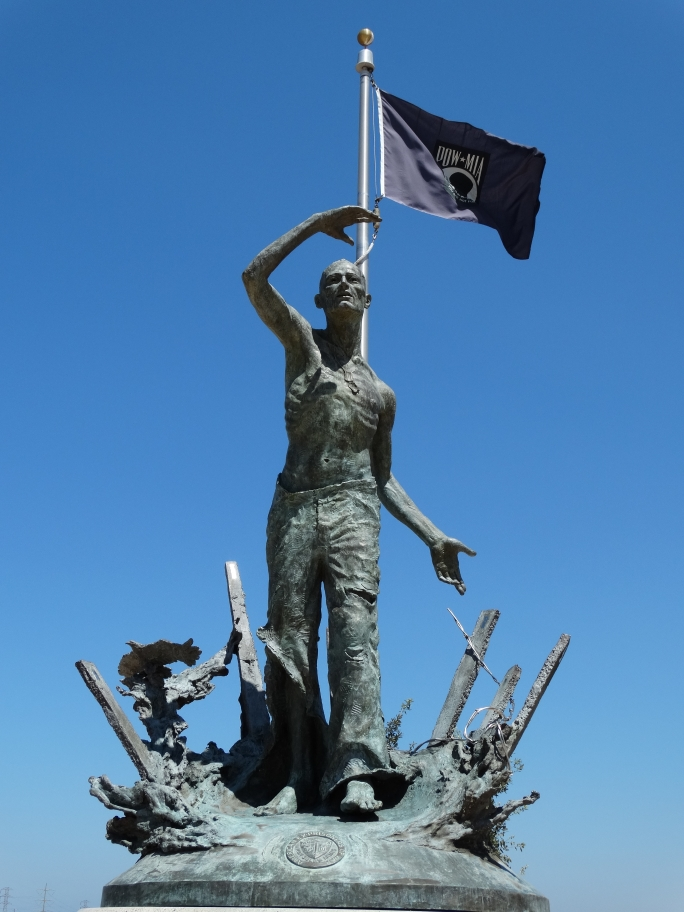
Liberation statue with POW flag

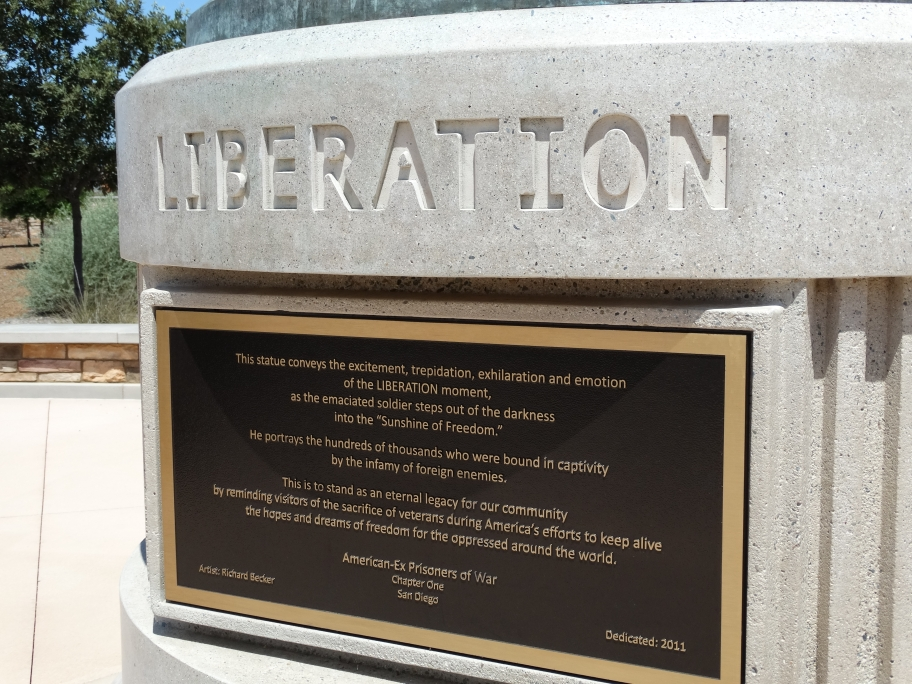
Liberation plaque – base of memorial

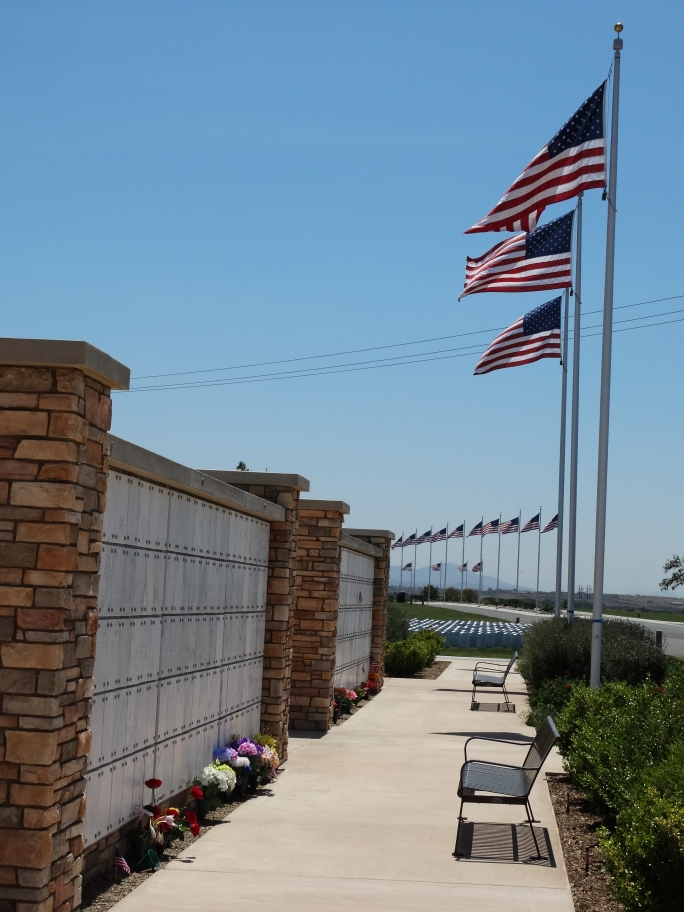
Columbarium Plaza – north wall showing Sections H & I

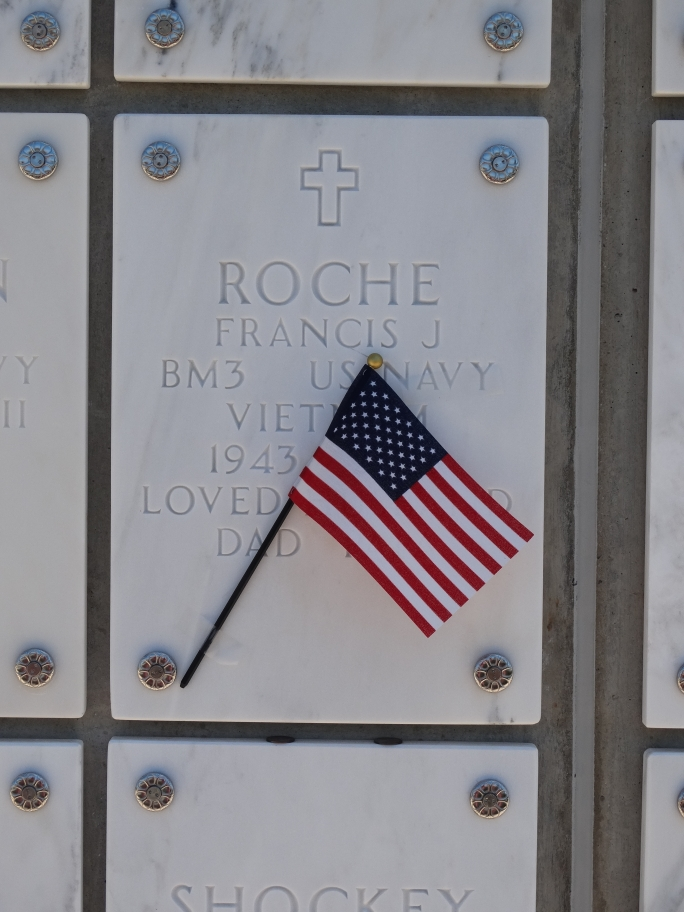
Columbarium urn crypt with American Flag

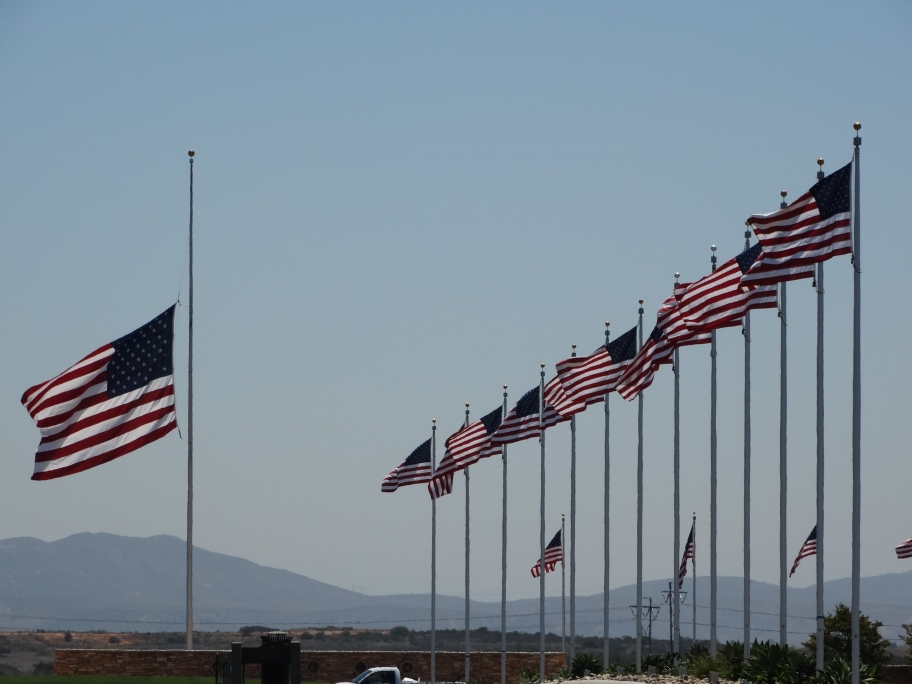
Avenue of Flags

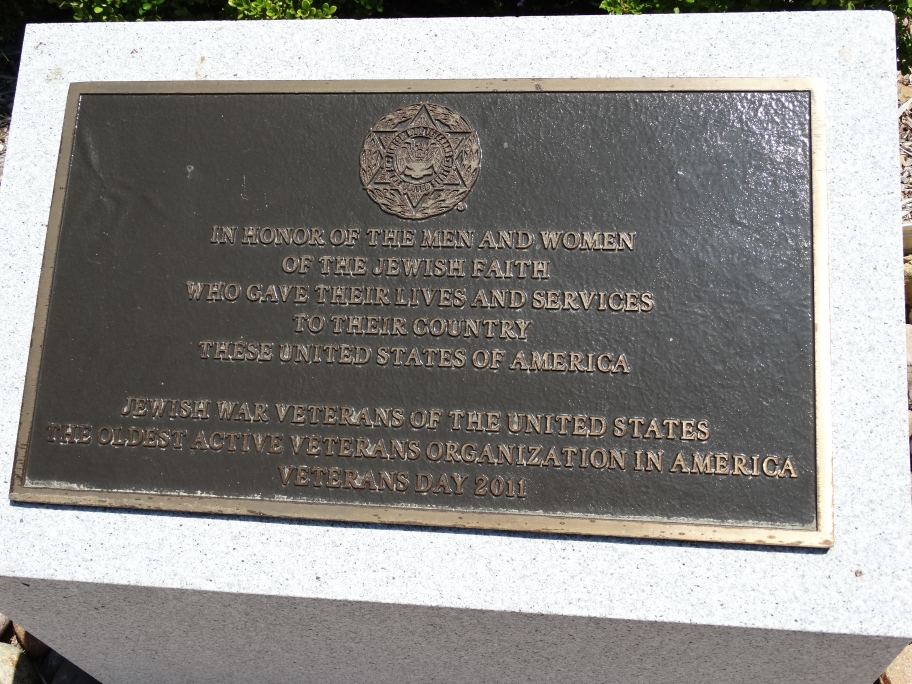
Jewish War Veterans plaque on the Memorial Walk

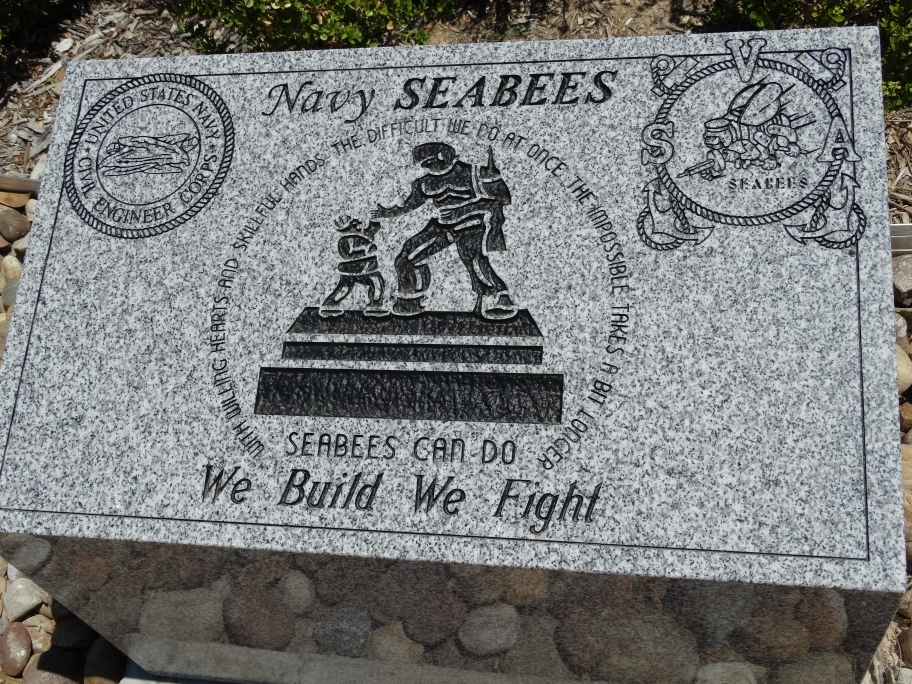
US Navy Seabees Memorial on the Memorial Walk

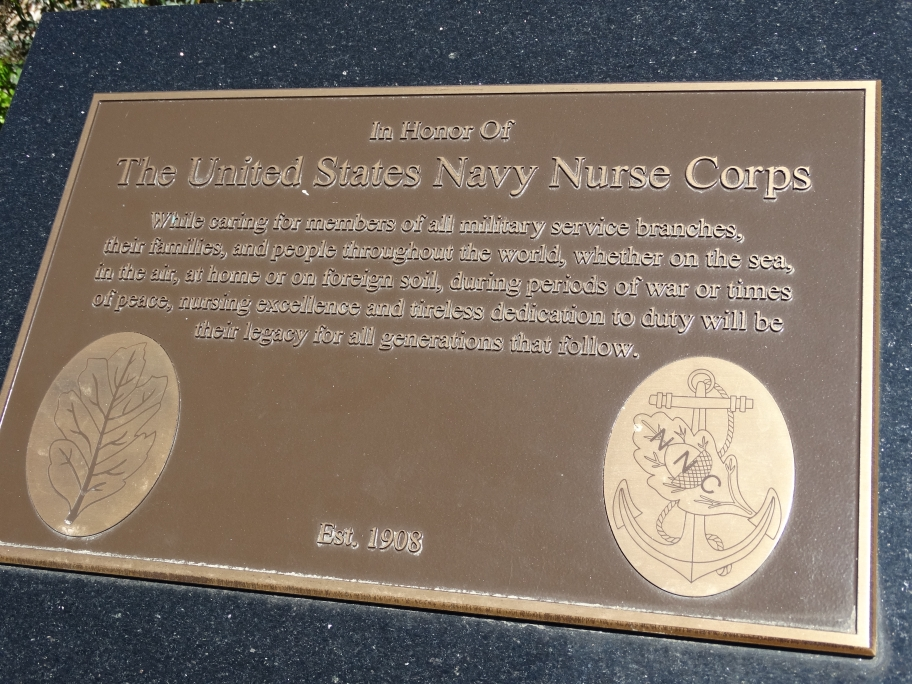
US Navy Nurse Corps plaque on the Memorial Walk

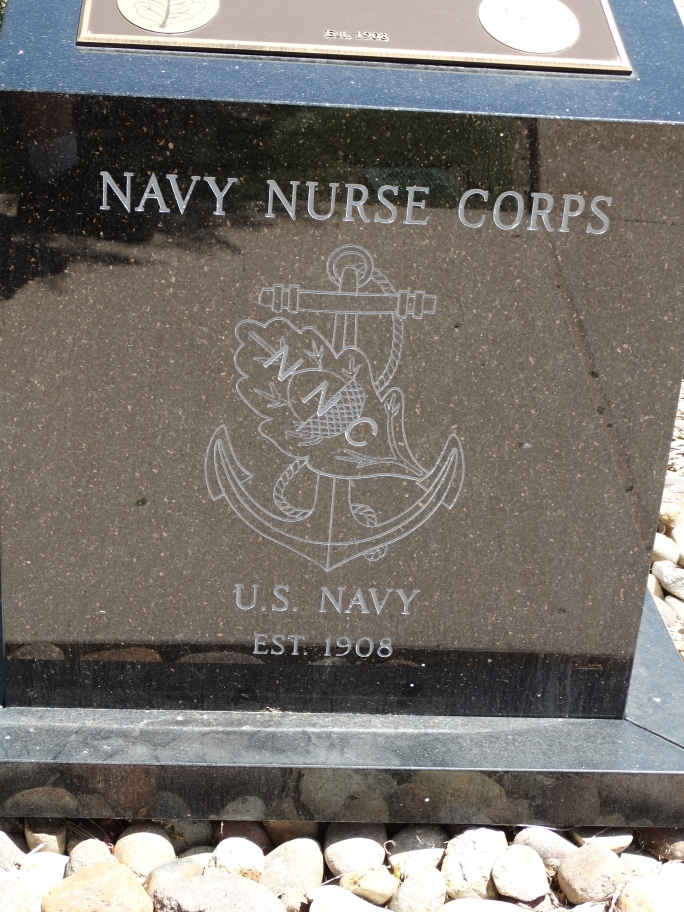
US Navy Nurse Corps memorial image on the Memorial Walk

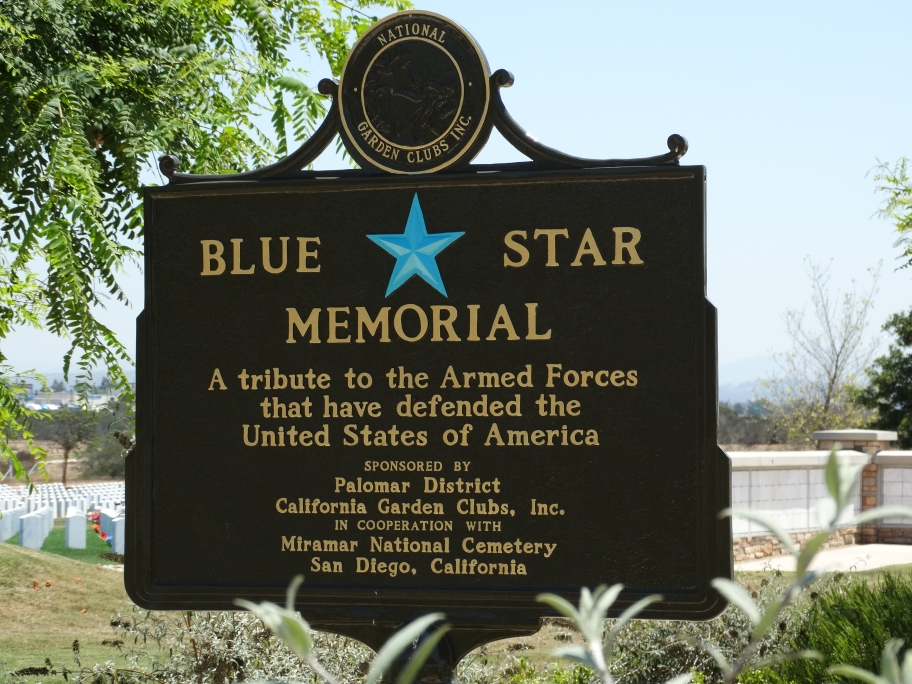
Blue Star Memorial – California Garden Club Palomar District – on the Memorial Walk

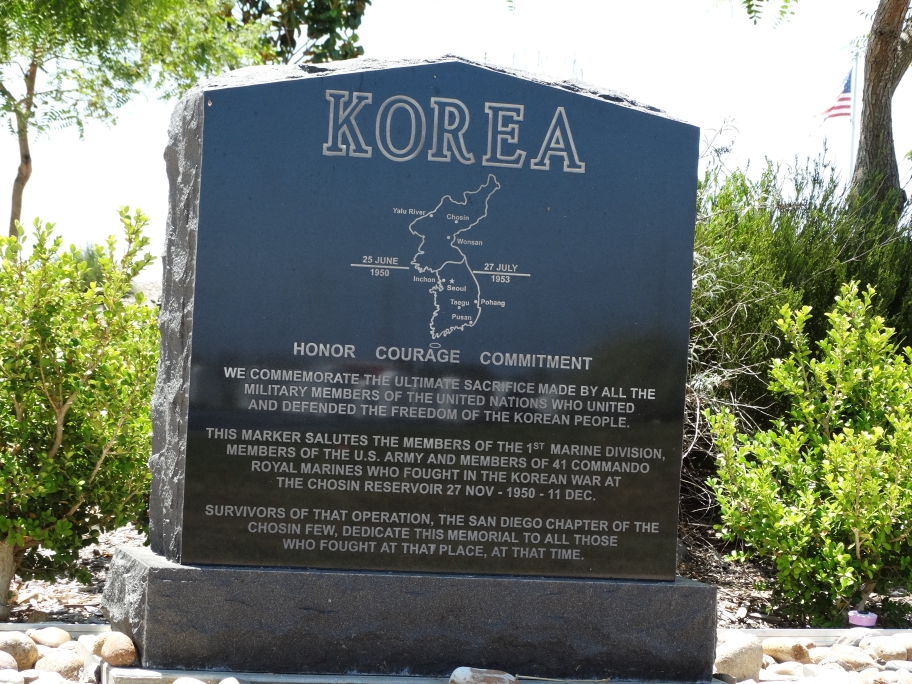
Korean War Memorial – Chosin Reservoir by the San Diego Chapter of the Chosin Few – on the Memorial Walk

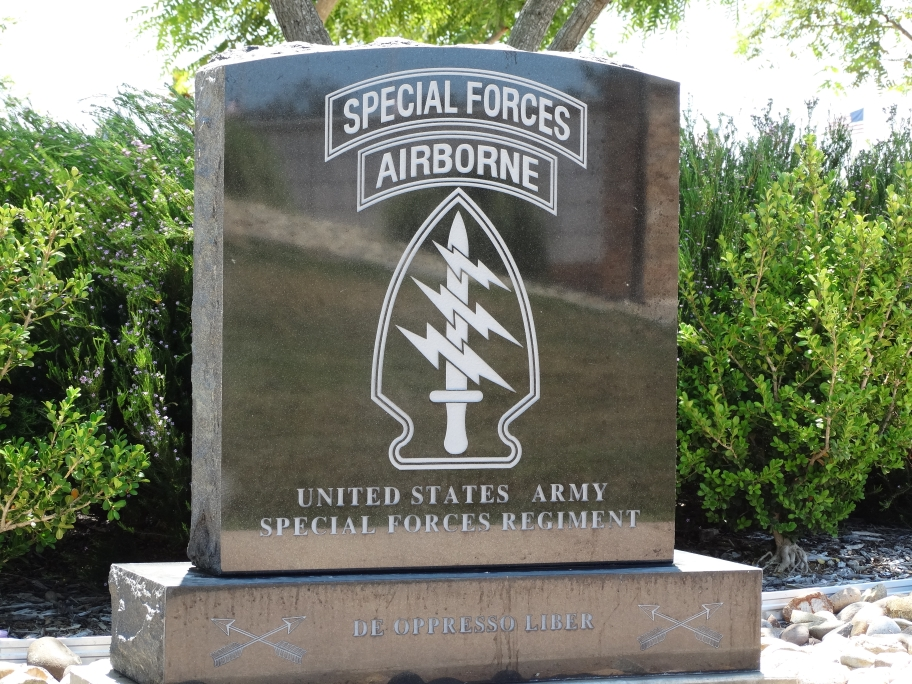
US Army Special Forces Memorial – on the Memorial Walk

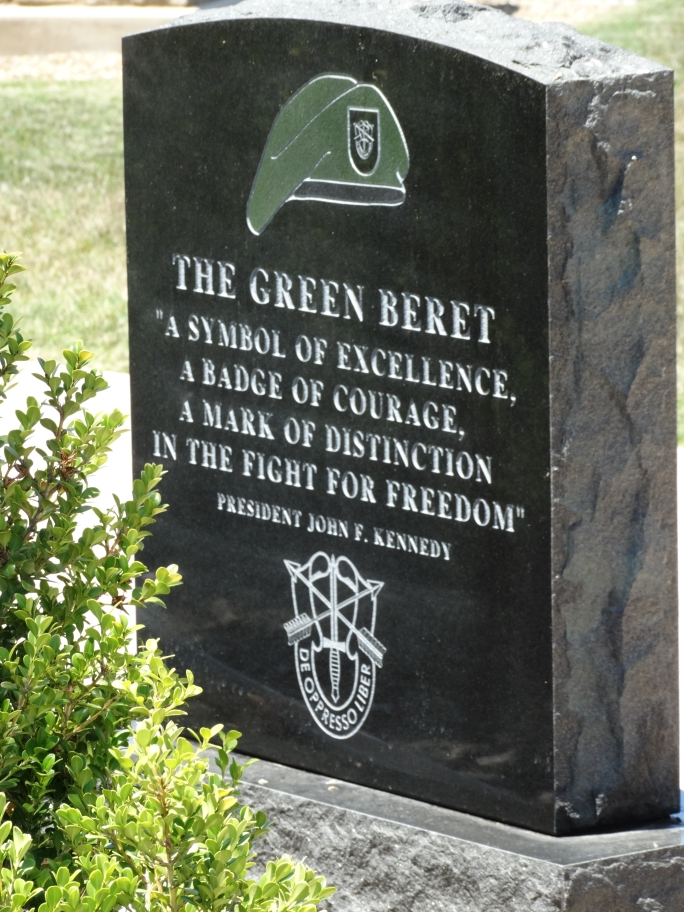
US Army Special Forces Memorial backside showing green Beret – on the Memorial Walk

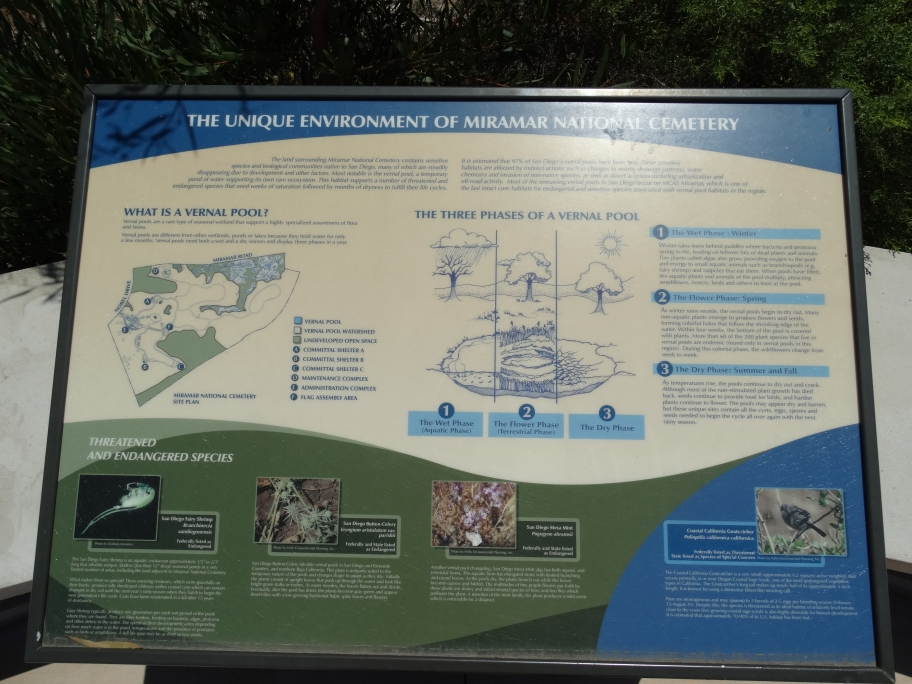
Environmental sign – near the Memorial Walk

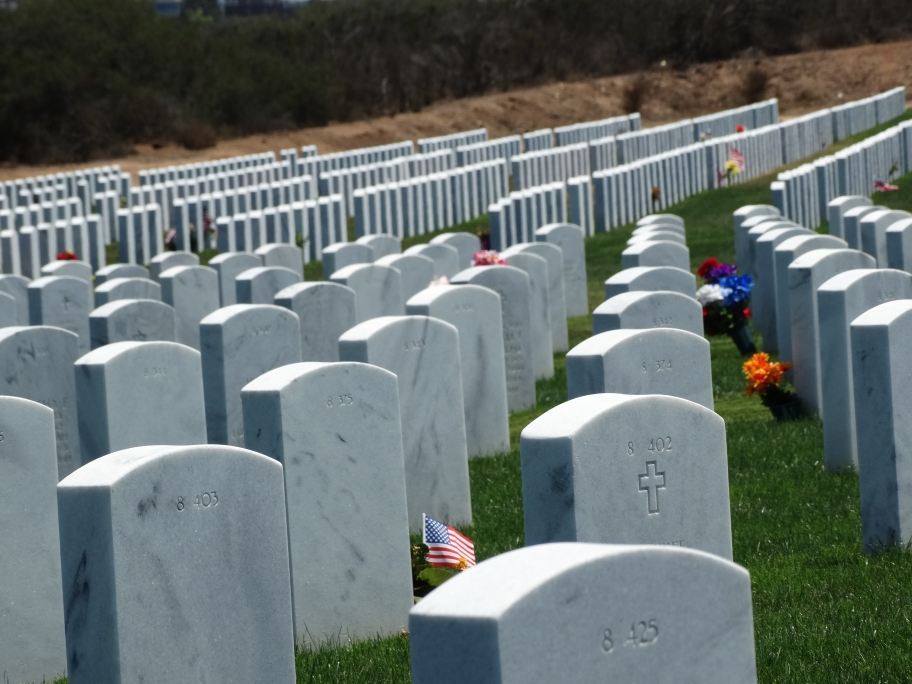
Headstones in Area 8

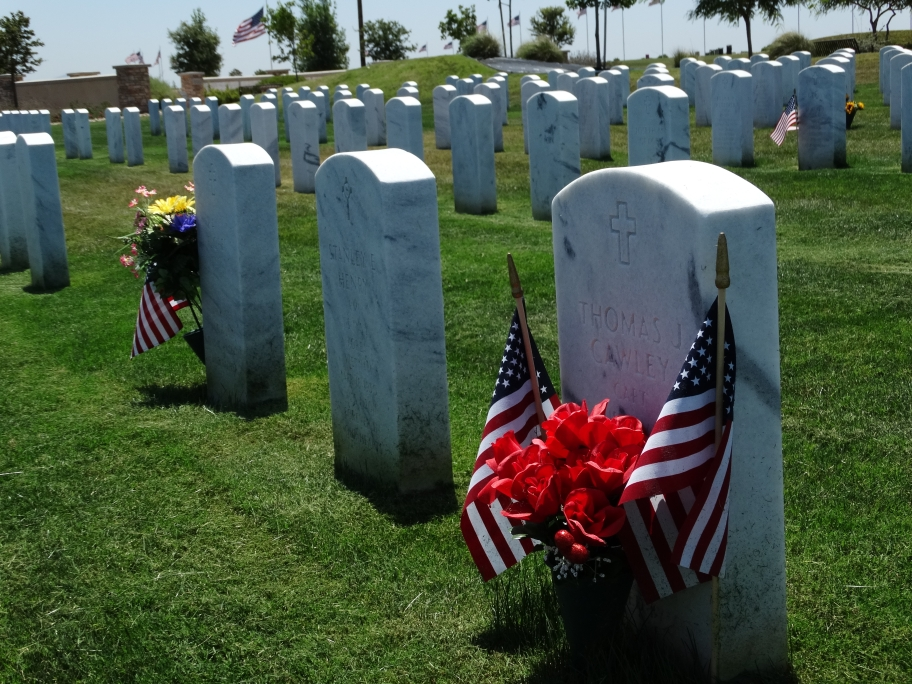
Headstones in Area 7

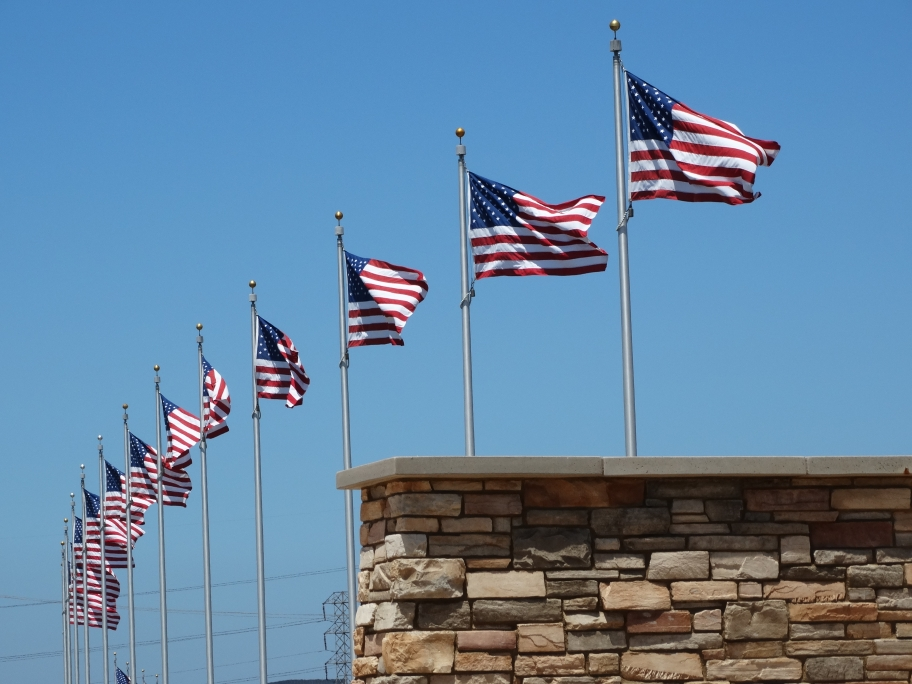
Avenue of Flags near the Flag Assembly area

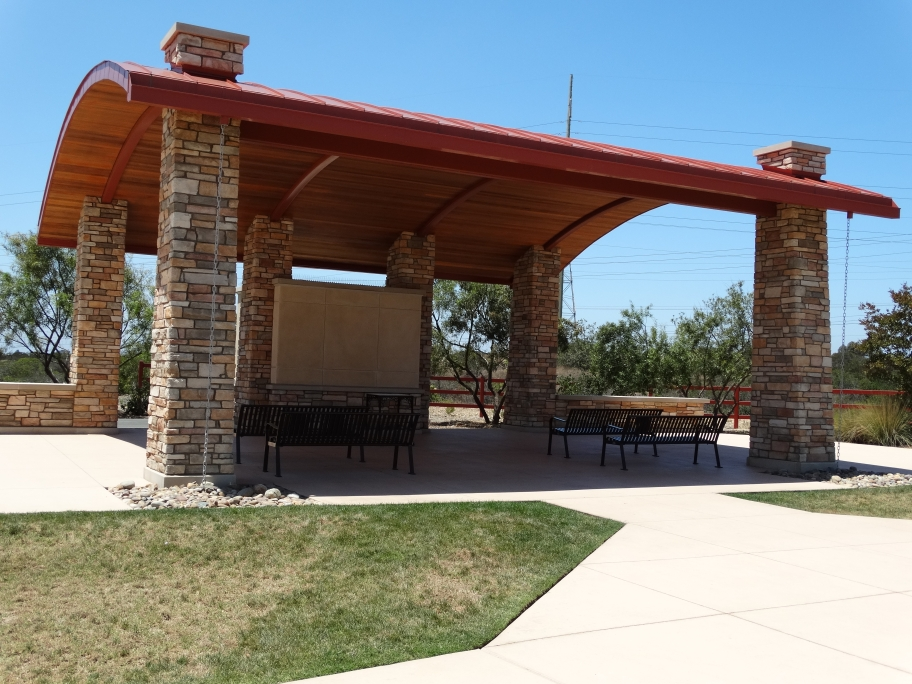
Committal Service Shelter

== First interments: November 22, 2010 ==
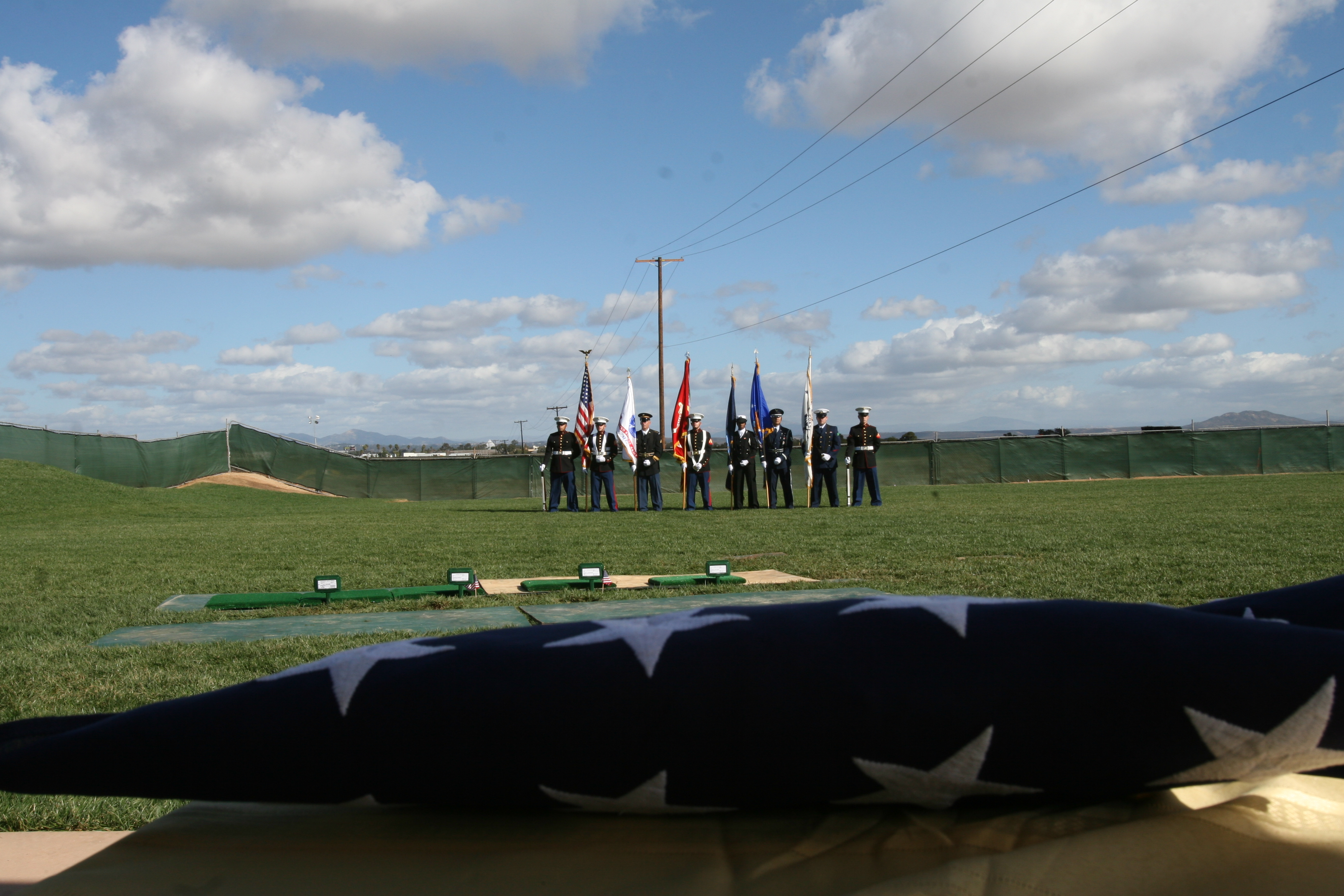
A joint-force color guard stands before the grave sites. These first five burials marked the official opening of the new facility.

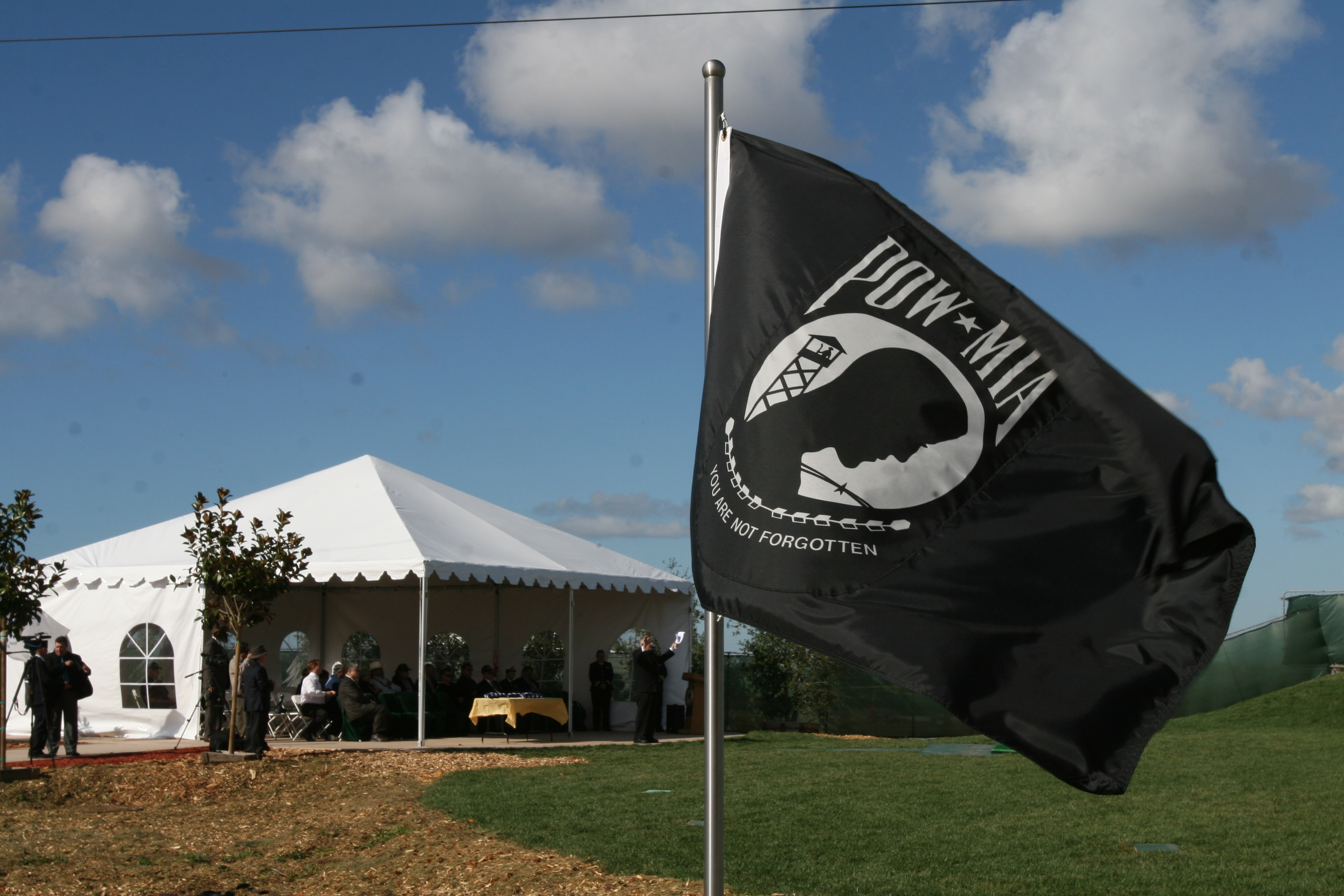
Ceremony attendees gather before the start of a burial while the iconic Prisoner of War/Missing in Action flag waves over the grounds.

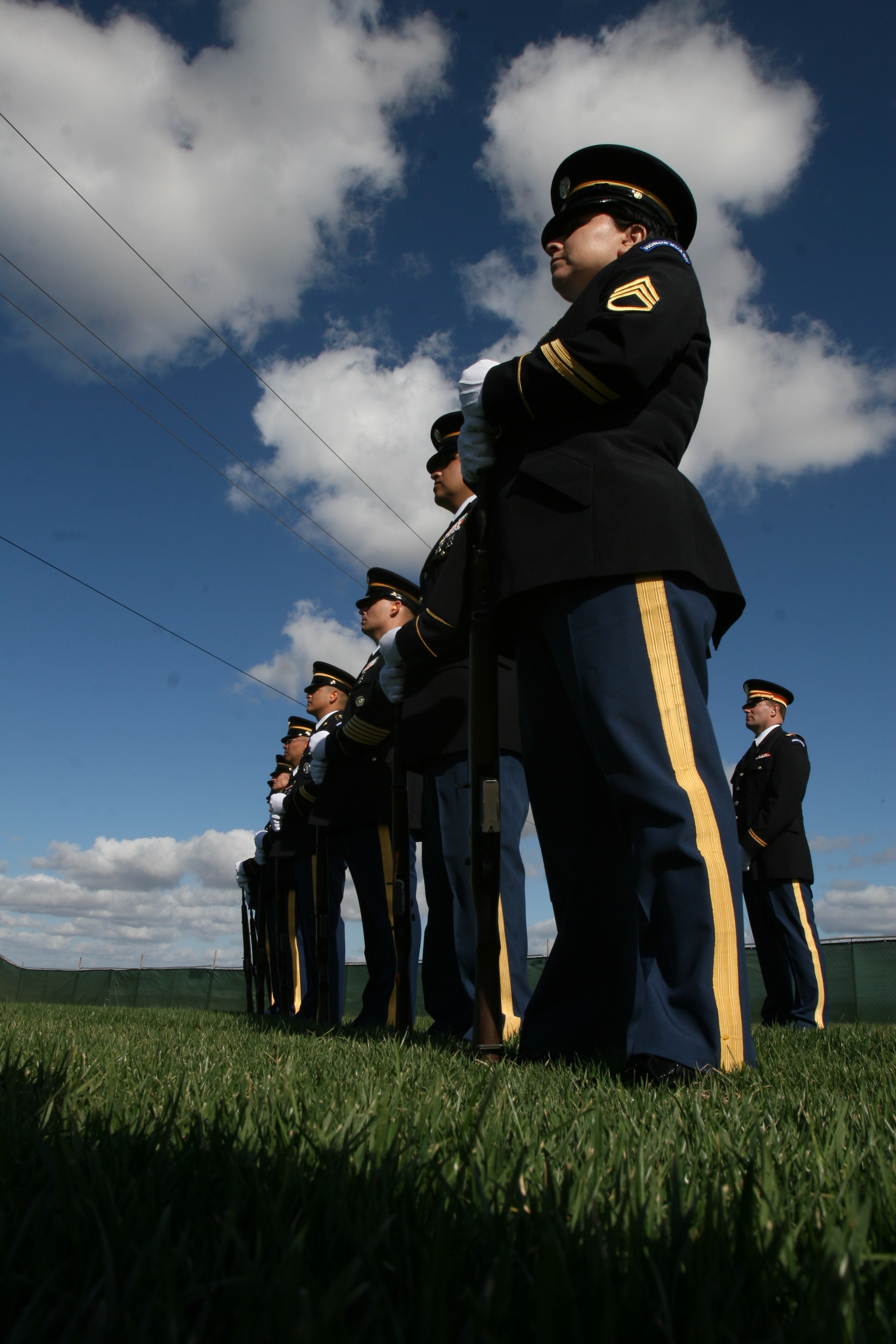
A US Army honor guard stands at parade rest, waiting to execute a rifle salute. Dignitaries performed the first burials at the facility, marking its official opening.

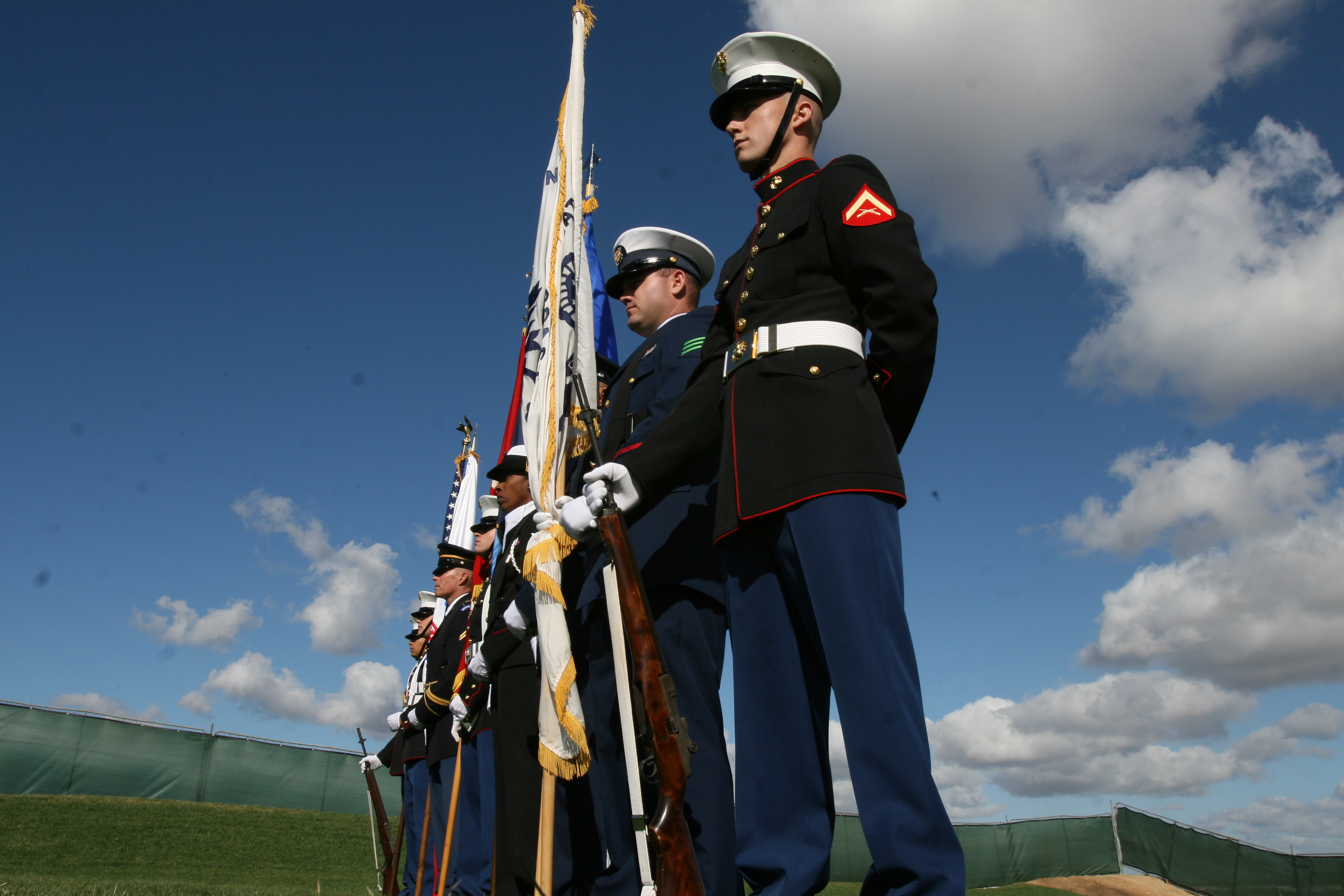
A joint-force color guard waits before the ceremony which marked the official opening.

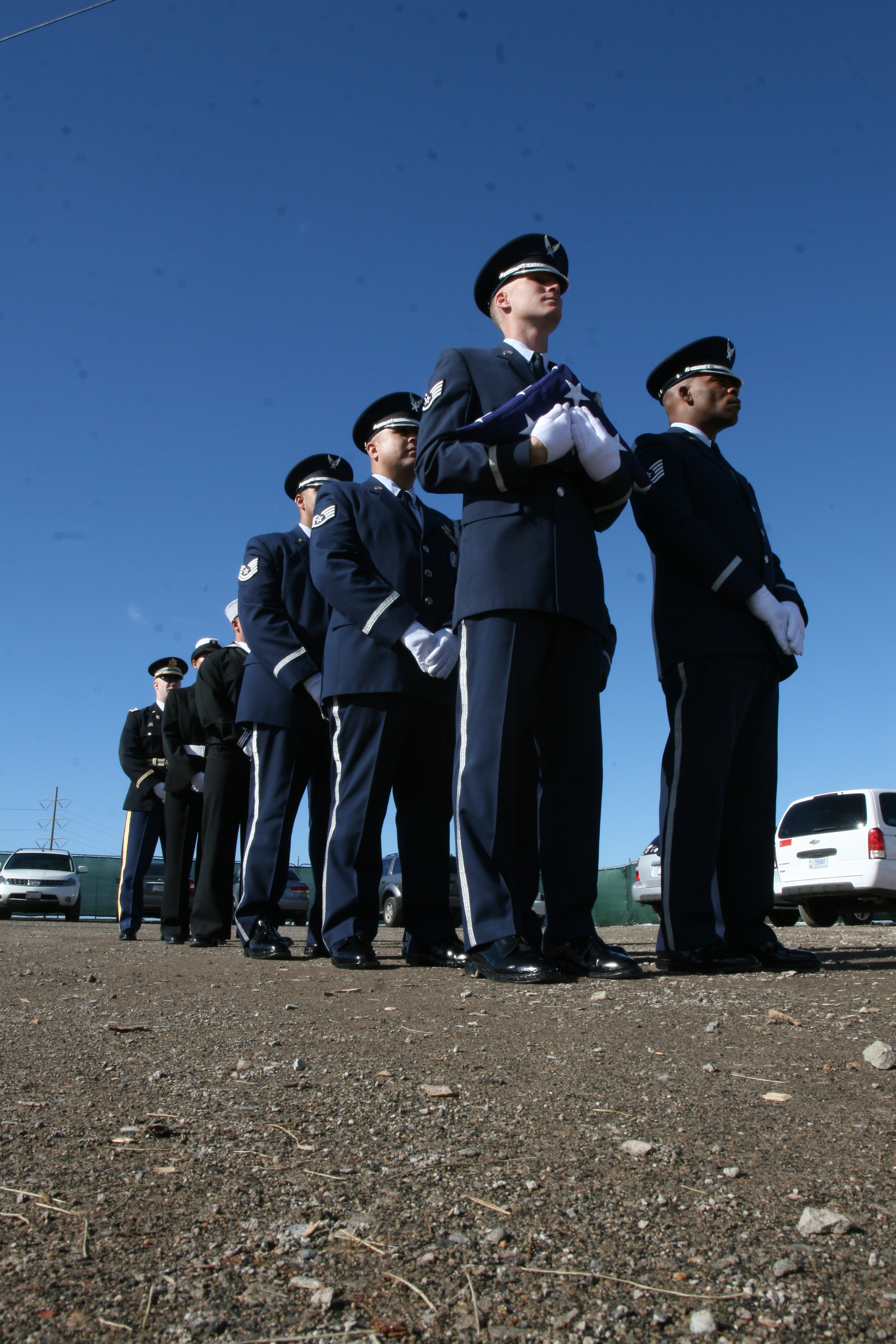
An Air Force honor guard prepares to present the American flag to the families of the veterans buried.

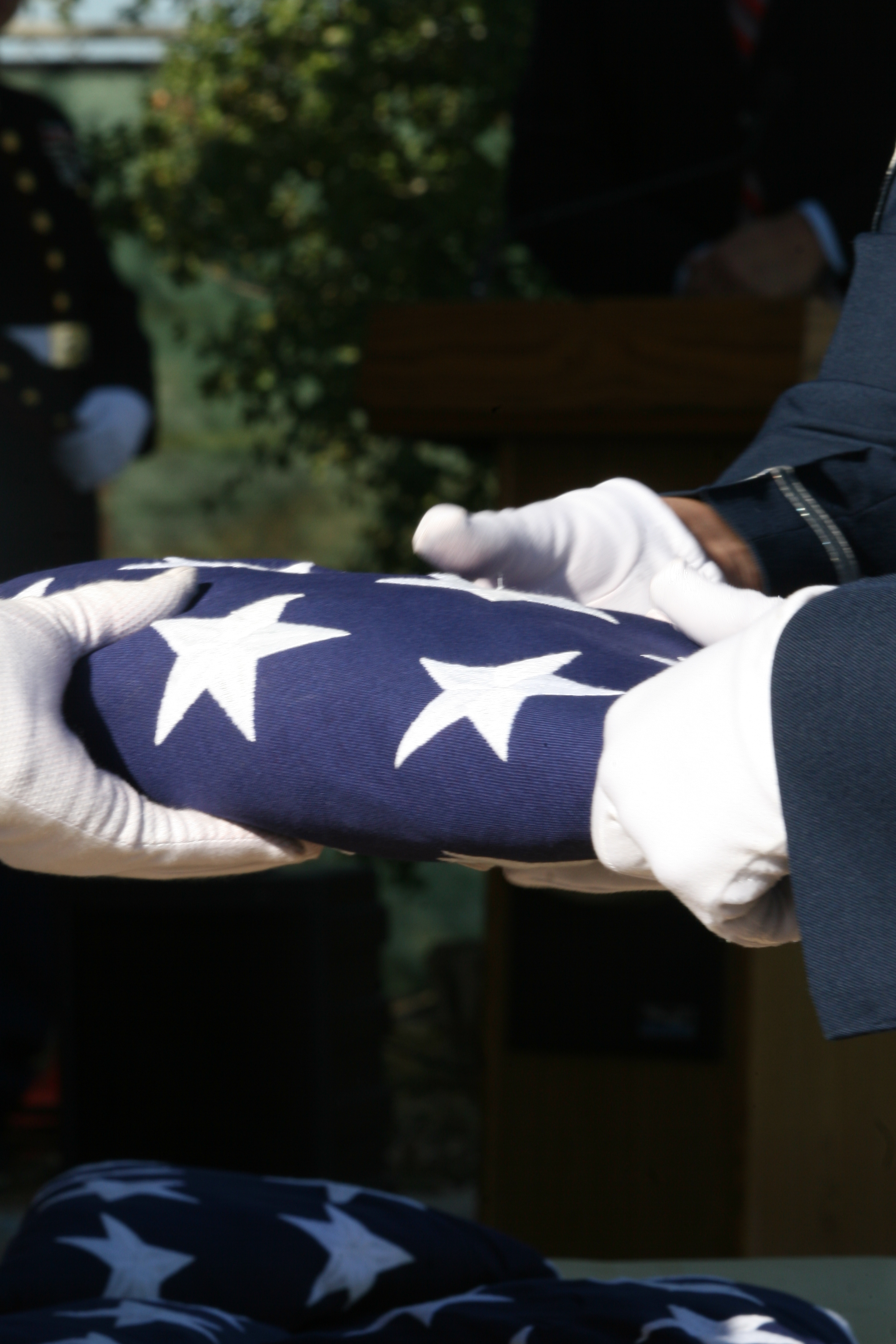
An Air Force honor guard folds the American flag after presenting it to the families of the first veterans buried.

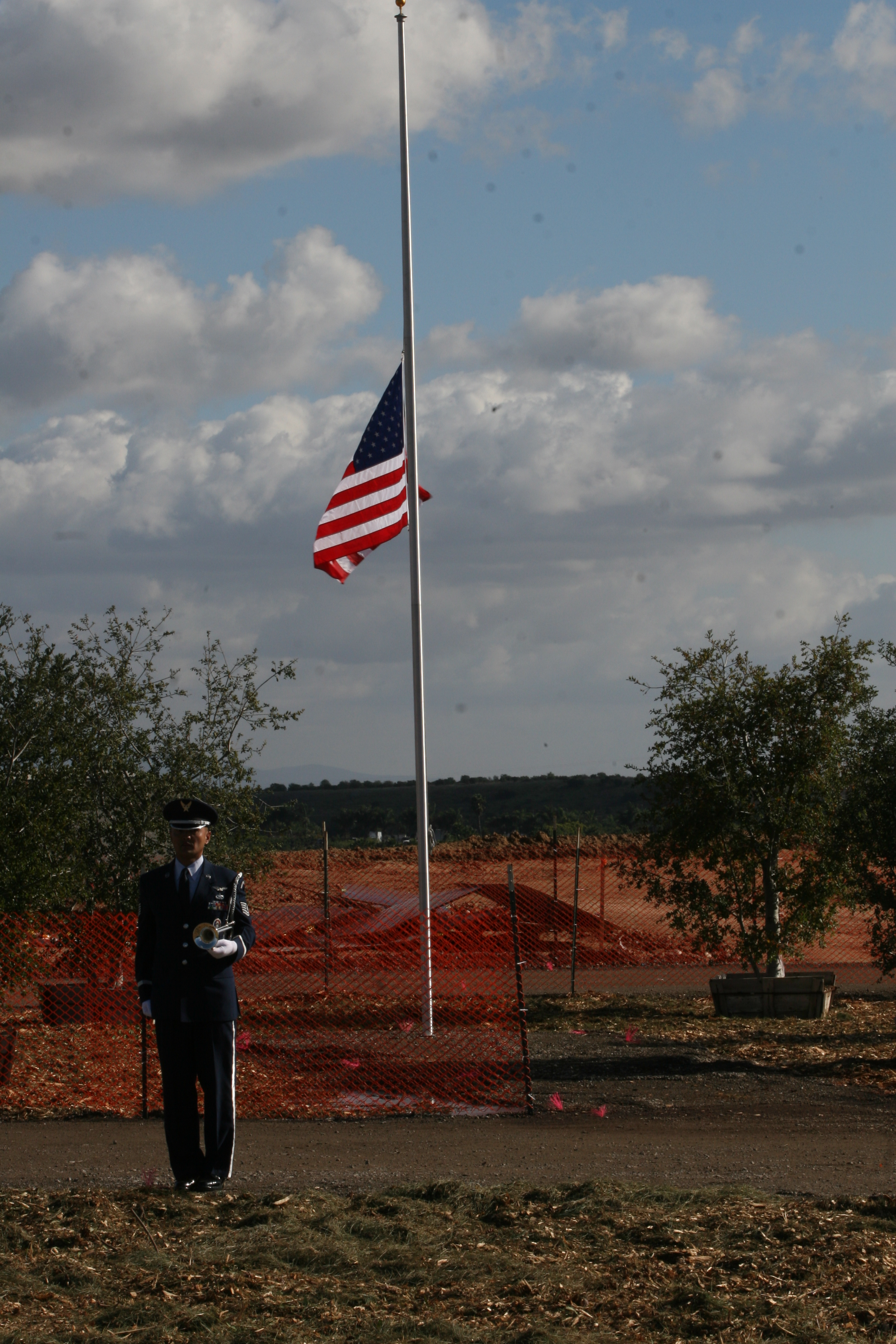
A lone bugler finishes a rendition of "Taps". Dignitaries buried four veterans and one spouse, marking the official opening of the new facility.

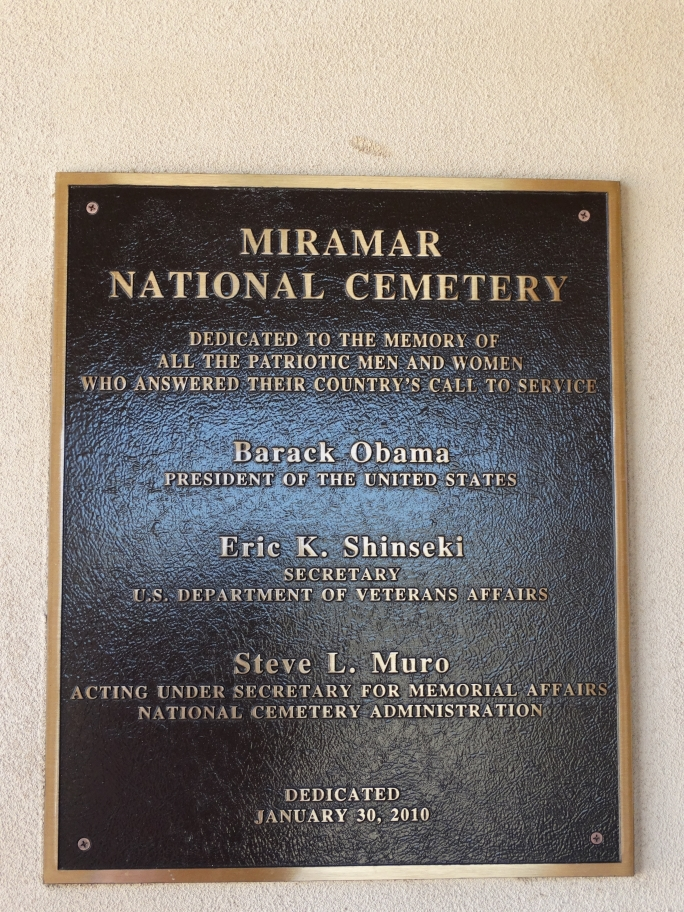
Miramar National Cemetery – 2010 Dedication plaque
