= VMTB-341 =

Marine Scout-Bomber Squadron 341
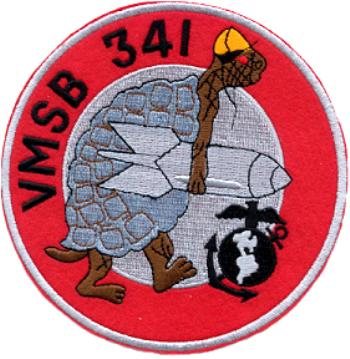
- VMSB-341 Insignia
- Active: 1 February 1943 – 13 September 1945
- Country: United States
- Branch: USMC
- Type: Dive Bomber squadron
- Role: Reconnaissance; Air Interdiction; Close air support
- Part of: Inactive
- Nickname(s): Torrid Turtles
- Engagements: World War II * Philippines campaign (1944–45)

Aircraft flown
- Bomber: SBD Dauntless

Marine Scout-Bomber Squadron 341 (VMSB-341) was a dive bomber squadron in the United States Marine Corps. The squadron, also known as the "Torrid Turtles", fought in World War II with Marine Aircraft Group 24, most notably in the Philippines campaign (1944–45). They were deactivated shortly after the end of the war on 13 September 1945.

== History ==
Marine Scout-Bomber Squadron 341 (VMSB-341) was commissioned on 1 February 1943 at Marine Corps Air Station Cherry Point, North Carolina. The squadron moved to Marine Corps Auxiliary Airfield Atlantic, North Carolina on 31 May 1943 but returned to MCAS Cherry Point on 1 August.

The squadron departed for the South Pacific and its flight echelon arrived at Pago Pago on 6 October 1943. Beginning in December 1943, the squadron was part of Strike Command and operated out of airfields on Efate, Munda and Bougainville. During this time, they flew strikes against bypassed Japanese bases in the Solomon Islands including Rabaul. On 24 June 1944, the squadron moved to Emirau Island. They moved again to Green Island in July 1944.

On 9 December 1944, Marine Aircraft Group 24 was ordered to begin its deployment to the Philippines from the Solomon Islands. For the flight echelon, their move meant a long, over-water endurance flight. For the ground echelon, it meant a miserably long sea voyage. VMSB-341 undertook such a move. The ground element left its Solomons base on 17 December, and its official history records the tortuous month on board ship that followed:

"This was a cargo vessel with no troop accommodations. Shortly after boarding, Tokyo Rose informed the squadron that it would never make it to the Philippines. After several days squadron personnel had their doubts, too. Field ranges were set up on deck to feed the troops. Shower facilities consisted of a length of pipe with numerous holes drilled in it, secured to the rigging and connected to a fire hose pumping seawater. Head facilities were equally primitive."

When the VMSB-341 ground element arrived at Hollandia, New Guinea, it alternated between that anchorage and the one at Lae, New Guinea, until finally departing for the Philippines on 8 January 1945. The squadron arrived at Leyte on 16 January and continued the trip the following day, arriving at Lingayen Gulf, Luzon, on 21 January. Finally disembarking on the 22nd, VMSB-341 proceeded 12 miles inland and then helped establish the airfield at Mangaldan. The squadron provided close air support during the duration of the Philippines campaign (1944–45).

VMSB-341 was redesignated Marine Torpedo Bombing Squadron 341 (VMTB-341) on 10 August 1945. One month after the Japanese surrender, the squadron was deactivated a month at Marine Corps Air Station Santa Barbara, California on 13 September 1945

== Notable Formal Members ==
- Jerry Coleman, then Second Baseman for the New York Yankees, flew with VMSB-341 during World War II.

== See also ==
- United States Marine Corps Aviation
- List of inactive United States Marine Corps aircraft squadrons
- List of United States Marine Corps aircraft squadrons
