= Jerry Coleman =

American MLB player, broadcaster, and manager (1924–2014)

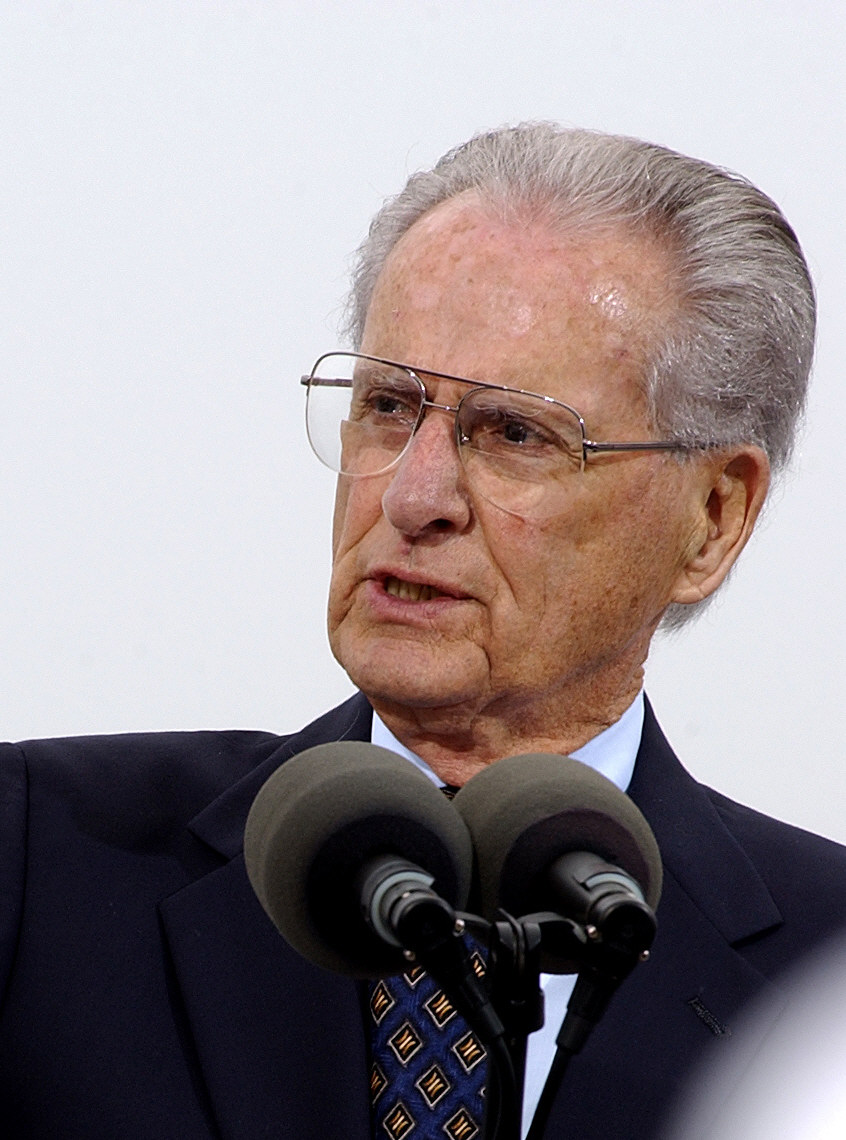
- Coleman in 2005
- Second baseman / Manager
- Born: September 14, 1924; San Jose, California, U.S.
- Died: January 5, 2014 (aged 89); San Diego, California, U.S.
- Batted: Right Threw: Right

MLB debut
- April 20, 1949, for the New York Yankees

Last MLB appearance
- September 29, 1957, for the New York Yankees

MLB statistics
- Batting average: .263
- Home runs: 16
- Runs batted in: 217
- Managerial record: 73–89
- Winning %: .451
- Stats at Baseball Reference
- Managerial record at Baseball Reference

Teams
- As player: New York Yankees (1949–1957); As manager: San Diego Padres (1980)

Career highlights and awards
- All-Star (1950); 4× World Series champion (1949–1951, 1956); Ford C. Frick Award (2005); San Diego Padres Hall of Fame
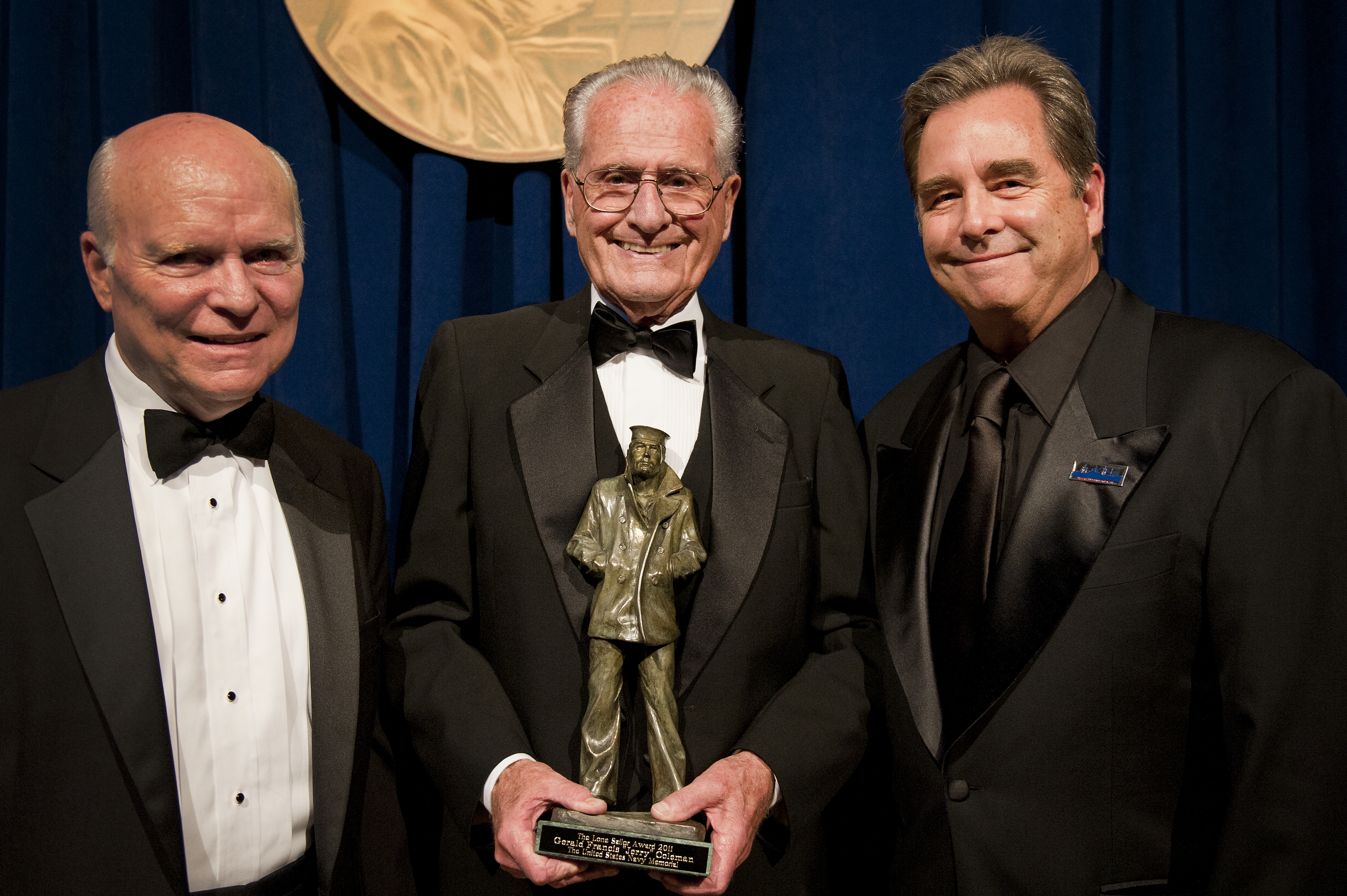

Military career
Coleman receiving the Lone Sailor Award in 2011
Burial place	Miramar National Cemetery, San Diego, California
Allegiance	United States of America
Branch	United States Marine Corps; *Marine Forces Reserve
Service years	1942–1964
Rank	Lieutenant colonel
Nickname	The Colonel
Units	VMSB-341; VMA-323
Conflicts	World War II: Solomon Islands campaign; Philippines Campaign (1944–45); Korean War
Awards	Distinguished Flying Cross (2) Air Medal (13)
Other work	New York Yankee Second Baseman; San Diego Padres Radio Announcer

Gerald Francis Coleman (September 14, 1924 – January 5, 2014) was an American Major League Baseball (MLB) second baseman for the New York Yankees and manager of the San Diego Padres for one year. Coleman was named the rookie of the year in 1949 by Associated Press, and was an All-Star in 1950 and later that year was named the World Series Most Valuable Player. Yankees teams on which he was a player appeared in seven World Series during his career, winning five times. Coleman served as a Marine Corps pilot in World War II and the Korean War, flying combat missions with the VMSB-341 Torrid Turtles (WWII) and VMA-323 Death Rattlers (Korea) in both wars. He later became a broadcaster, and he was honored in 2005 by the National Baseball Hall of Fame with the Ford C. Frick Award for his broadcasting contributions.

== Playing career ==
1947 picture pack card of Coleman for New York Yankees

Born in San Jose, California, Coleman graduated from Lowell High School, then spent his entire playing career with the New York Yankees. He played six years in the Yankees' minor league system before reaching the big club in 1949. Coleman hit .275 in his first year and led all second basemen in fielding percentage. He was the Associated Press rookie of the year in 1949 and finished third in balloting by the Baseball Writers' Association of America.

Coleman avoided a sophomore slump by earning a selection to the All-Star team in 1950. He then shone in the World Series, which saw him drive the go-ahead run in Game 1 along with the game-winning hit in Game 3 while also providing brilliant defense, earning him the BBWAA's Babe Ruth Award as the series's most valuable player.

Nicknamed "The Colonel" because he was a U.S. Marine Corps lieutenant colonel, Coleman was a Marine aviator who postponed his entry into professional baseball in World War II and later left baseball to serve in the Korean War. While a Marine Corps aviator he flew 120 combat missions (57 during World War II and 63 in Korea). and received numerous honors and medals including two Distinguished Flying Crosses. In the years before his death, Coleman received numerous honors, including induction into the USMC Sports Hall of Fame, for his call to duty. Coleman was the only Major League Baseball player to see combat in two wars. (While Ted Williams served during both World War II and Korea, he flew combat missions only in the Korean War.)

Coleman's career declined after he was injured the following season, relegating him to a bench role. He was forced to retire after the 1957 season, but he left on a good note, hitting .364 in a World Series loss against the Milwaukee Braves. He appeared in the World Series six times in his career, winning four of them.

Coleman appeared on the February 5, 1957 of the CBS game show To Tell the Truth as an imposter for singer Don Rondo. He received two votes.

== Broadcasting career ==
In 1958, New York Yankees general manager George Weiss named Coleman personnel director, which involved Coleman scouting minor league players. Roy Hamey terminated Coleman from that position, upon becoming the Yankees' general manager. It was only after Coleman met with Howard Cosell that Coleman considered becoming a broadcaster.

In 1960, Coleman began a broadcasting career with CBS television, conducting pregame interviews on the network's Game of the Week broadcasts. His broadcasting career nearly ended that year; he was in the midst of an interview with Cookie Lavagetto when the national anthem began playing. Coleman kept the interview going through the anthem, prompting an avalanche of angry letters to CBS.

In 1963, he began a seven-year run calling Yankees games on WCBS radio and WPIX television. He was added to the Yankee broadcast team of Mel Allen, Red Barber, and Phil Rizzuto. During this time, he lived in Ridgewood, New Jersey, which he described as being "19.9 miles from Yankee Stadium, but a million miles from New York".

After broadcasting for the California Angels for two years, in 1972 Coleman became the lead radio announcer for the San Diego Padres, a position he held every year until his death in 2014 except for 1980, when the Padres hired him to manage (predating a trend of broadcasters-turned-managers that started in the late 1990s). He was known in San Diego for his signature catchphrase, "You can hang a star on that one, baby!", which he would deliver after a spectacular play. During home games, the phrase would be accompanied by a tinsel star swinging from a fishing pole that emanated from his broadcast booth. Coleman's other catchphrases included "Oh Doctor!", "And the beat goes on", and "The natives are getting restless".

Coleman lent these catchphrases to great use when the Padres defeated the Chicago Cubs in Game 5 of the 1984 National League Championship Series to clinch the pennant and their first ever trip to the World Series.

Here's the Goose...the 1–1 pitch. A one hopper to Nettles, to Wiggins...and the Padres have the National League pennant!!! Oh doctor, you can hang a star on that baby!!!

He also called national regular-season and postseason broadcasts for CBS Radio from the mid-1970s to 1997.

During an interview in the height of the steroids scandal in 2005, Coleman stated, "If I'm emperor, the first time 50 games, the second time 100 games and the third strike you're out", referring to how baseball should suspend players for being caught taking steroids. After the 2005 World Series, Major League Baseball put a similar policy in effect.

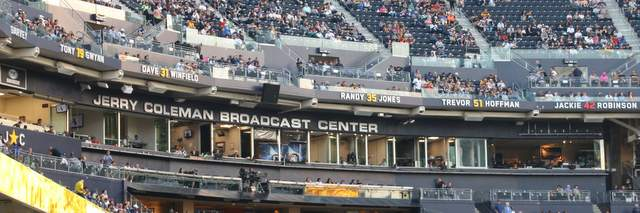
The Padres named their press box at Petco Park "The Jerry Coleman Broadcast Center" in Coleman's honor.

Coleman was known as the "Master of the Malaprop" for making sometimes embarrassing mistakes on the microphone, but he was nonetheless popular. In 2005, he was given the Ford C. Frick Award of the National Baseball Hall of Fame for broadcasting excellence, and is one of six Frick award winners who also played in the Major Leagues (the others are Joe Garagiola, Tony Kubek, Tim McCarver, Bob Uecker and Ken Harrelson).

He was inducted into the San Diego Padres Hall of Fame in 2001. In fall 2007, Coleman was inducted to the National Radio Hall of Fame as a sports broadcaster for his years as the play-by-play voice of the San Diego Padres. The Padres would also dedicate their press box to Coleman, renaming it "The Jerry Coleman Broadcast Center".

Ted Leitner and Andy Masur replaced Coleman for most of the radio broadcasting efforts for each Padres game. He did, however, still work middle innings as a color analyst. As of the 2010 season, he reduced his broadcast schedule down to 20–30 home day games. As of November 2010, Coleman was the third-oldest active play-by-play announcer, behind only fellow Hall of Famers Felo Ramirez and Ralph Kiner.

Coleman collaborated on his autobiography with longtime New York Times writer Richard Goldstein; their book An American Journey: My Life on the Field, In the Air, and On the Air was published in 2008. On September 15, 2012, the Padres unveiled a Coleman statue at Petco Park. Coleman's statue is the second statue at Petco Park, the other being of Hall of Fame outfielder Tony Gwynn.

== Awards ==
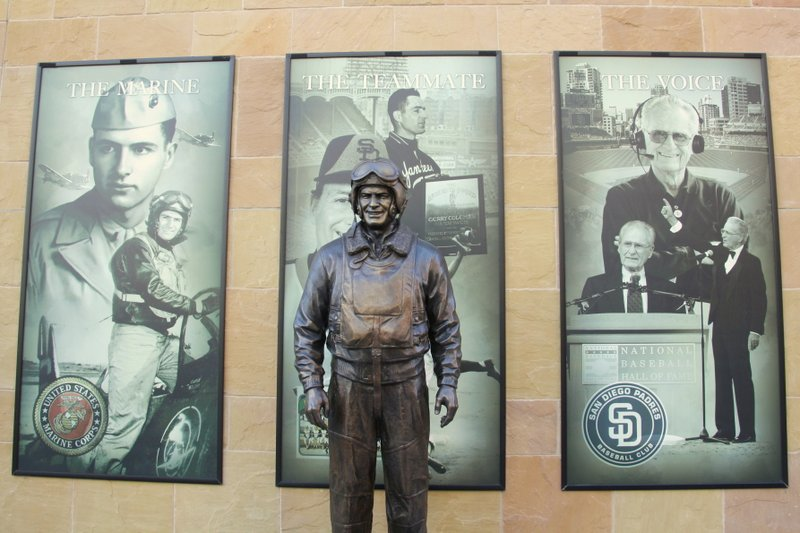
Statue of Coleman at Petco Park

Coleman was the recipient of the following medals:

- Distinguished Flying Cross (2)
- Air Medal (13)
- American Campaign Medal
- Asiatic-Pacific Campaign Medal
- World War II Victory Medal
- National Defense Service Medal
- Korean Service Medal
- Philippine Liberation Medal
- United Nations Service Medal

In 2011, Coleman was inducted into the International Aerospace Hall of Fame in a ceremony at the San Diego Air & Space Museum for his service as a combat pilot in World War II and the Korean War. Although several Major League ballplayers flew during WWII, he was the only active member of MLB to do the deed twice, forgoing his career to fly in combat in both wars. The SDASM restored a vintage F4U "Corsair" fighter-bomber in the markings of Coleman's aircraft during the Korean War and it is displayed under their SBD "Dauntless" dive bomber (which Coleman flew in combat during WW2).

== Death ==
Coleman's death was reported by the San Diego Padres on January 5, 2014. He died after being hospitalized after a fall in his home. He was 89. Coleman was interred at Miramar National Cemetery after a private funeral.

== Legacy ==
In 2015, a sports facility at Marine Corps Recruit Depot San Diego was named in honor of Coleman.
