= Richard Goldstein (writer, born 1942) =

American journalist and writer (born 1942)

Richard Goldstein (born October 25, 1942) is an American journalist and writer. Beginning in 1980, he wrote four baseball books. He has also written in several other fields.

Goldstein worked as an editor at The New York Times from 1980 to 2007 and also wrote for the paper. He continues to contribute obituary articles to The Times. He is a 1963 graduate of Brooklyn College and received a master's degree in political science from the University of Michigan in 1964. Before joining The Times, he worked for the New York Daily News, Newsday and United Press International.

== Writing career ==
=== Baseball writings ===
Goldstein's five sports books include four on baseball. He wrote a pioneering study of baseball during World War II (Spartan Seasons), and a well-received history of Brooklyn baseball (Superstars and Screwballs). Goldstein collaborated with former New York Yankees infielder and broadcaster Jerry Coleman on Coleman's autobiography (An American Journey).

=== Historian ===
Goldstein broadened his range in 1994 when he wrote about D-Day, 50 years after it occurred. His 1997 book Mine Eyes Have Seen is a first-person memoir of critical American events. He detailed the sinking of the Andrea Doria in a 2003 book.

=== Most recent book ===
He also wrote a book entitled Helluva Town: The Story of New York City During World War II.

== Major works ==
- Spartan Seasons: How Baseball Survived the Second World War (1980)
- Superstars and Screwballs: 100 Years of Brooklyn Baseball (1991)
- You be the Umpire! (1993)
- America at D-Day: A Book of Remembrance (1994)
- Ivy League Autumns: An Illustrated History of College Football's Grand Old Rivalries (1996)
- Mine Eyes Have Seen: A First-Person History of the Events That Have Shaped America (1997)
- Desperate Hours: The Epic Rescue of the Andrea Doria (2003)
- An American Journey: My Life on the Field, In the Air, and On the Air, with Jerry Coleman (2008)
- Helluva Town: The Story of New York City During World War II
