= Statue of Jerry Coleman =

Statue in San Diego, California, U.S.

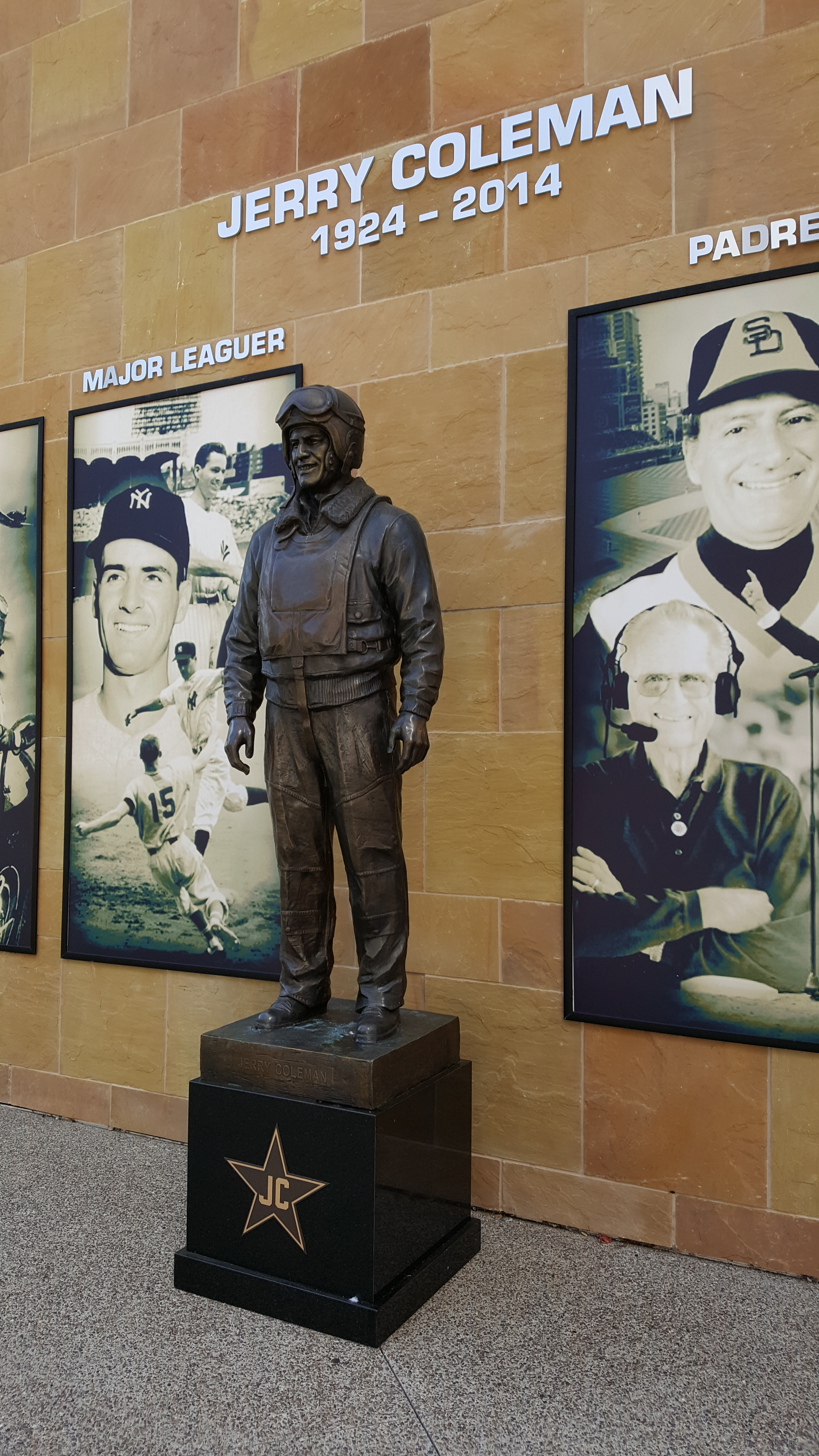
- The statue in 2016
- Medium: Bronze sculpture
- Subject: Jerry Coleman
- Location: San Diego, California, U.S.; 32°42′29.8″N 117°9′21.9″W

A statue of Jerry Coleman was installed at San Diego's Petco Park, in the U.S. state of California, in 2012.
