= An American Journey =

2008 autobiography by Jerry Coleman and Richard Goldstein

- Author: Jerry Coleman and Richard Goldstein
- Language: English
- Genre: Non-fiction
- Publisher: Triumph Books
- Publication date: 2008
- Publication place: United States
- Media type: Print (Hardcover)
- Pages: 228
- ISBN: 978-1-60078-064-6
- Dewey Decimal: 796.357092-dc22

An American Journey: My Life on the Field, In the Air, and On the Air is a 2008 autobiography written by Jerry Coleman and Richard Goldstein. Coleman is a recipient of the Ford C. Frick Award at the National Baseball Hall of Fame and is a member of the United States Marine Corps Sports Hall of Fame located at Marine Corps Base Quantico, in Quantico, Virginia.

== Summary ==
Jerry Coleman was a former professional baseball player, a retired Marine officer, and a long-time baseball announcer for the San Diego Padres. Born in San Jose, California, Coleman played for the New York Yankees during the 1940s and 1950s. During that time, he was also a Marine fighter pilot and saw combat action in both World War II and the Korean War, the only professional baseball player to do so.

After his baseball career ended, Coleman worked at a number of different jobs, but eventually landed in sports broadcasting.

The book focuses on four major parts of Coleman's life.

- Difficult childhood. Coleman was born in the midst of the Great Depression into a family with little money. His father was a violent alcoholic who made life difficult for the family. His mother eventually divorced her husband, and moved Coleman and his sister to an apartment. In a drunken rage, Coleman's father tracked her down and shot her four times. She survived, but unable to work, and divorced from her husband, she could not support the family and they were forced to subsist on public welfare. After several years, his father, who was never jailed for shooting his wife, returned to the family and remarried Coleman's mother, an arrangement that was more about economics and survival than love.
- Career as a baseball player. Coleman's career as a player for the Yankees began in 1949 when he batted .275 and won the Associated Press Rookie of the Year award. Coleman played second base, shortstop, and third base during a nine-year career that included six World Series appearances, including the 1950 World Series where Coleman won the World Series Most Valuable Player Award. Coleman was also selected as an All Star in 1950. His final game as a baseball player was on September 29, 1957.
- War time experiences. Coleman was the only baseball player to see action in both World War II, where he flew 57 combat missions, and in the Korean War, where he flew 63 missions. After his tour of duty in Korea, Coleman returned to the Yankees but remained in the Marine reserves until 1964, eventually reaching the rank of lieutenant colonel. In the book, Coleman claimed that the years he spent in the Marines were the most important part of his life, eclipsing his career as a baseball player.
- Broadcasting career. After retiring as a player, Coleman worked for the Yankees as a personnel director, but eventually left that job in 1960 and, at the advice of his friend Howard Cosell, began his career as broadcaster for CBS where he announced the Major League Baseball Game of the Week. After several years of network broadcasting, Coleman returned to the Yankees as a broadcaster in 1963 and remained with the team until 1970 when he returned to his native California and began work as a sports broadcaster for KTLA TV in Los Angeles. In 1973, he left that position and began broadcasting for the Padres, a position he was still holding as of 2013. In 2005, Coleman was enshrined in the baseball Hall of Fame when he was given the Ford C. Frick Award for excellence in broadcasting.

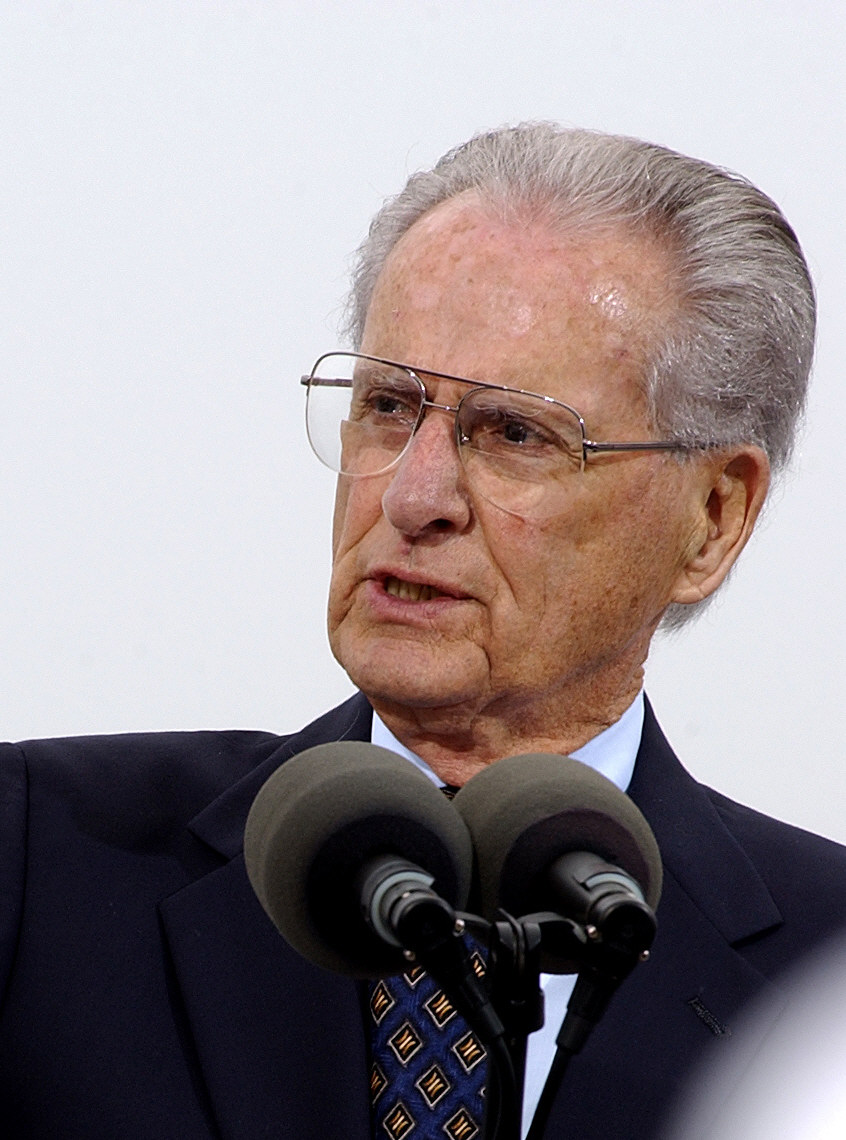
Coleman delivers opening remarks for a ceremony commemorating the 60th anniversary of the allied victory over Japan (VJ Day) during World War II. The ceremony was held at Naval Air Station North Island and was attended by area service members.

Coleman had multiple offers over the years to write his autobiography but chose not to do so until he was encouraged by his wife to write his story for his children. He chose Goldstein as his collaborator because of Goldstein's experience writing about both sports and the military.

On January 5, 2014, Coleman died at the age of 89 as a result of complications from head injuries sustained during a fall in December 2013.

== Reviews ==
"Men of Coleman’s generation don’t like to be called heroes and don’t like to talk about what happened in the war. They know how fortunate they are to have made it home when so many friends didn’t. Goldstein starts out the book with Coleman describing “Jerry Coleman Day” at Yankee Stadium — a day to honor his return from Korea that he reluctantly went along with. In gut-wrenching detail, Coleman recounts waking up the morning of his “Day” to be met at the hotel where he was staying by the widow of Major Max Harper, the friend Coleman saw shot down in front of him. Harper’s widow didn’t want to believe her husband was dead. She wanted to hope he would be one of the prisoners of war who would be returned by the North Koreans. Coleman was the only person she would believe. He had to tell her he saw the plane go down in a crash that he couldn’t have survived. Then he had to take part in “Jerry Coleman Day” ceremonies before the game. Think about that story the next time you hear somebody downplaying Jerry Coleman’s life as a ballplayer, a war hero and as a Padres broadcaster."

"I've just read, "An American Journey," a most fascinating book filled with one surprise after another. It's a story of the eventual triumph of a man who was able to shed an unhappy, traumatic childhood, and with uncommon perseverance, became the man he is today - a successful, caring human being who should be an example for every struggling, young American who may've felt he wasn't dealt the right cards going into the world."

"Political columnist George Will, a baseball fanatic of the first order, pens the foreword to Padres announcer Jerry Coleman's memoir, An American Journey (Triumph Books). Writes Will of Coleman, who played on eight pennant-winning Yankees teams and was a combat hero in WWII and Korea: "No broadcaster has earned a more affectionate following than Jerry. When you read this memoir, you will not only know why, you will join his legion of followers."
