= Charles Schroeter =

US Army soldier and Medal of Honor recipient

- Born: July 4, 1837; Lüneburg, Kingdom of Hanover
- Died: January 27, 1921 (aged 83); San Diego, California, US
- Burial place: Miramar National Cemetery San Diego, California
- Military career
- Allegiance: (United States) United States; Union
- Branch: Union Army 1863–1865; United States Army 1866–1876; United States Marine Corps 1876–1881; United States Army 1881–1894
- Rank: Sergeant
- Unit: Medal of Honor with Company G of 8th United States Cavalry 1869
- Conflicts: American Civil War; Battle at Chiricahua Mountains(MOH); American Indian Wars
- Awards: Medal of Honor

Charles Schroeter (July 4, 1837 – January 27, 1921) was a United States Army soldier who received the Medal of Honor for his actions during the American Indian Wars, while serving with Company G, 8th Regiment of the United States Cavalry. A German immigrant, his military career spanned thirty-one years, from 1863 to 1894, during which he also saw action in the American Civil War. He also served a tour of duty in the United States Marine Corps. After retirement from the military, he became a merchant.

== Biography ==
While listed repeatedly as being born in Lindberg (which is in Bavaria) and also Hanover both in present-day Germany, it is more likely he was born in Lüneburg in the Kingdom of Hanover in 1837. "Lüneburg" is pronounced "Lümborg" in Low German and influenced by the Germanic umlaut or linguistic mark. English speakers may have heard and written it as "Lindberg" or "Lindbergh". Later records cite July 4, 1837, as his birthday. His parents' names are unknown.

Charles Schroeter came to America in 1860 on the German passenger ship Bremen. The ship had picked up passengers at Hanover and Bremen, in Germany, before arriving in New York City on November 12, 1860. He was listed as a merchant. The ship then proceeded to New Orleans.

He found work in New Orleans then moved upriver to St. Louis before hostilities broke out. After his service in the Civil War and his career in the military, he opened "a retail confectionery and cigar store" with "E.L. Hoopes" after moving to Buffalo, New York, in 1894. He was cited in an 1898 Erie County biography as "a successful and prominent citizen, with a long and honorable career, his worth has been duly recognized."

He was noted about 5 feet 6 inches tall, weighed 135 lb, with light brown eyes, black hair, and a fair complexion. His military records vary from 5 feet 4 inches to 5 feet 6 1/4 inches in height. His eye color varies from hazel, to light brown in those same records. His complexion was always listed as fair or ruddy. The variations in the records are not uncommon in the 1800s since each individual officer processing the enlistment had no standard manner, place, light or equipment to make accurate measurement.

Charles G. Schroeter reportedly never married or had any children. In 1918, he moved to San Diego, California. He died there on January 27, 1921, at age 83.

== Military service ==
=== Civil War ===
On March 15, 1863, Charles Schroeter was mustered into the 1st Volunteer Missouri Cavalry Regiment, 1st Battalion, Company A under Captain Stierlin as a private. His enlistment papers were signed on February 27, 1863. He was mustered out as a private in Company C at Little Rock, Arkansas, on September 1, 1865.

Schroeter and his fellow cavalry soldiers in the 1st Battalion served, conducted operations and fought (with the exceptions to Companies A and C cited below) in the Trans-Mississippi Theater of the American Civil War in the following specific areas as cited in "A Compendium of the War of the Rebellion, V. III" by Frederick H. Dyer, 1908, pages 1301–1302.

- Regiment at Rolla, Missouri until June 1863.
- Regiment moved to Pilot Knob, Missouri and joins General John Davidson's Cavalry Division.
- Expedition against Little Rock, Arkansas, July 1 September 1 to 10, 1863.
- Engagement at Pocahontas, Missouri August 24.
- Engagement at Shallow Ford and Bayou Meto, Arkansas County, Arkansas on August 30.
- Action near Shallow Ford on September 2.

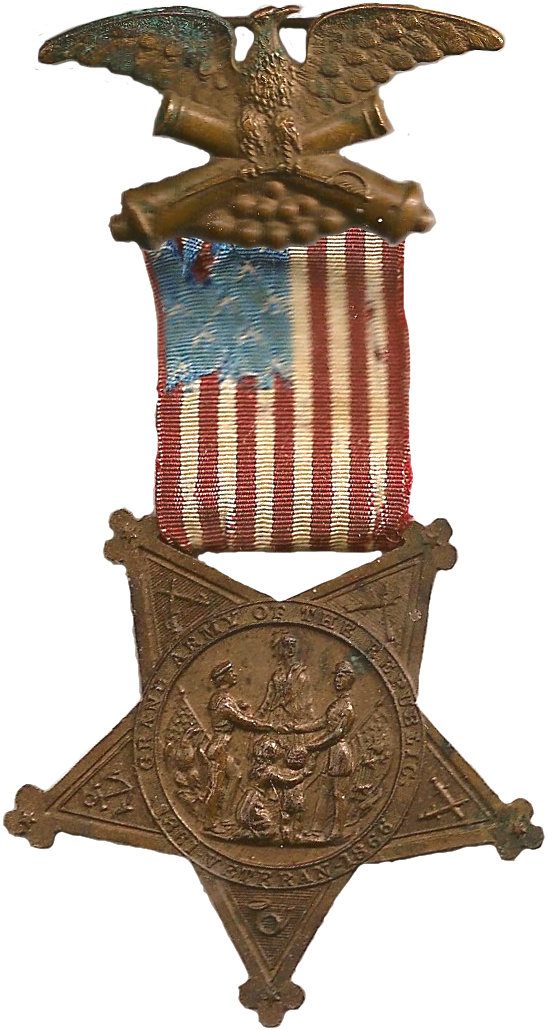
The Grand Army of the Republic badge authorized by the U.S. Congress to be worn on the uniform by Union Army veterans.

- Engagement at Bayou Fourche and capture of Little Rock, Arkansas September 10.
- Expedition from Benton to Mt. Ida Arkansas November 10–18
- Engagement at Caddo Gap, Arkansas November 11.
- Action near Benton December 1.
- Reconnaissance from Little Rock December 5–13. (1863)
- Regiment at Little Rock until March 1864.
- Regiment at Carter's Creek Polk County, Arkansas in January 1864.
- Regiment with General Frederick Steele's Expedition to Camden, Arkansas March 23 to May 3, 1864.
- Engagement at Rockport, Arkansas March 25.
- Action at Arkadelphia, Arkansas March 29.
- Action at Spoonville, Clark County, Arkansas April 2.
- Action at Little Missouri River on April 6.
- Engagement at Prairie D'Ann April 9–12.
- Action at Camden on April 15.
- Action at Jenkins' Ferry, Saline River on April 30.
- Operations against Confederate General Shelby north of Arkansas River May 18–31, 1864.
- Action at Osceola, Arkansas on August 2.
- Action at Benton, Arkansas on August 18.
- Action near Pine Bluff, Arkansas August 18.
- Scout to Benton September 6–7.
- Reconnaissance to Princeton, Arkansas October 19 to 23.
- Expedition to Saline River November 17 to 18.
- Expedition to Mt. Elba in Cleveland County, Arkansas from January 22 February 22 to 4, 1865.
- Regiment at Little Rock, Arkansas until mustering out on September 1, 1865.

=== 1866–1871 ===
8th US Cavalry coat of arms

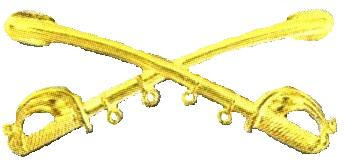
United States Cavalry branch insignia

Following the Civil War, Schroeter worked briefly as a clerk, until August 9, 1866, when he reenlisted in the United States Army at St. Louis, Missouri. Being sworn in by Captain Bates as a private, he was assigned to the 8th Cavalry Regiment and Company (later Troop) G. He fought Cochise and the Chiricahua Apaches during a battle at Rocky Mesa in the Chiricahua Mountains on October 20, 1869, earning the Medal of Honor for Gallantry in Action. This engagement was caused by an earlier attack (October 5) on a stagecoach that killed two civilians and four soldiers traveling as passengers to Tucson, Arizona and an attack on a group of cowboys in the Sulphur Springs Valley by Apache Indians.

U.S. Medal of Honor version given from 1862 to 1895

A detachment of 66 men of the 1st Cavalry Regiment and 61 men of Company G under Lieutenant John Lafferty of the 8th Cavalry had tracked the Apaches into the Chiricahua Mountains and eventually to an engagement what some called the "Campaign of the Rocky Mesa." The combined troops were led by Captain Reuben F. Bernard of the 1st Cavalry. The cool overcast day became "a miserable day, cold with rain and hail, when the cavalrymen attacked." The Apaches were well entrenched and defending behind rocks and boulders near the top of a ridge. The soldiers had to climb a defile or a steep-sided and narrow passage of loose slick rocks to go over and around as they moved up toward the top of the mesa. More than one fell due to the weather conditions. Under these deplorable conditions Schroeter and his fellow soldiers advanced upwards toward the hostile Indians.

Captain Bernard noted in his report: "These men are they who advanced with me up the steep and rocky mesa under as heavy a fire as I ever saw delivered from the number of men, Indians, say from one hundred to two hundred. These men advanced under this fire until within thirty steps from the Indians when they came to a ledge of rocks where every man who showed his head was shot at by several Indians at once. Here the men remained and did good shooting through the crevices of the rocks until ordered to fall back which was done by running from rock to rock where they would halt and return the fire of the Indians."

As darkness fell, Schroeter with other cavalrymen were ordered to withdraw. They did so in good order individually and in small groups taking their wounded with them down the dangerous slick slopes under enemy fire. Some would provide covering fire while others retreated a short distance, then the process would repeat. Schroeter's commanding officer, Lt. Lafferty, in trying to recover dead soldiers was shot in the mouth destroying his lower left jaw. The entire action cost a likely overestimated 15 to 18 Apache lives and two confirmed soldiers dead with about 4 or 5 (accounts differ) wounded troopers. Schroeter completed his first tour of duty as a private with F Company, 8th Cavalry Regiment on August 9, 1871, while at Fort Selden in New Mexico.

=== 1871–1876 ===
He was reenlisted by Captain Brown on October 7, 1871, at St. Louis, Missouri as a soldier. He is listed as being born at Hanover, Germany, now age 34. He description was noted as Hazel eyes, black hair and fair complexion with his height as 5 feet 6 1/4 inches. The 1st Infantry Regiment campaigned against the Sioux in the 1870s while Schroeter was with them. He completed his second enlistment as a sergeant with C Company, 1st Infantry Regiment, while stationed at Fort Sully, Dakota Territory on October 7, 1876. His character was listed as "excellent."

=== 1877–1881 ===
United States Marine Corps Globe and Anchor.

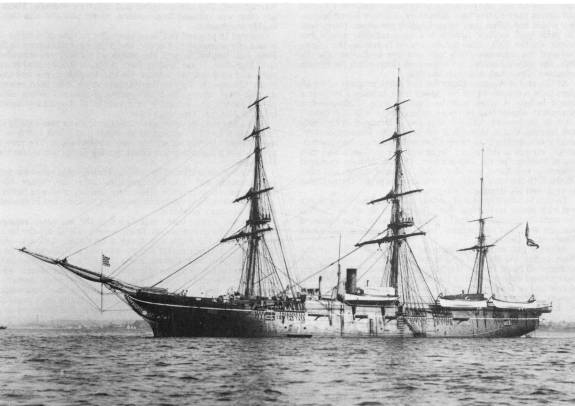
USS Alliance at anchor.

Schroeter traveled to Washington, D.C., and on November 2, 1877, he was sworn into the United States Marine Corps. Private Schroeter reported aboard USS Alliance in March 1877. He was one of the 26 Marines aboard that screw gunboat. Deployed in Mediterranean Schroeter with his shipmates called at many ship ports for the next three years. Corporal Schroeter was discharged from the Marine Corps on November 2, 1881. (Note: At the same general time period, another "Charles Schroeter" joined the U.S. Army on May 27, 1878, while in New York City, New York. The information entered by Capt. Cheffield, shows his birth as in Saxony, Germany, Age 38, a merchant, with blue eyes, dark hair, ruddy complexion, and being 5 feet 3 inches high. This Charles Schroeter deserted on November 8, 1878, while at Jefferson Barracks. It appears the Schroeter of this article was a victim of identity theft.)

When Marine Private Schroeter went aboard the USS Alliance, she was a new ship built in 1875. She had been commissioned on January 18, 1877, with Commander Theodore F. Kane as captain. On March 9 she sailed to join the European Squadron with the mission of protecting American lives and property, and showing the American flag. The Alliance was based at Ville-franche, France, where, with the permission of the French Government, the United States maintained a supply depot.

Soon after arrival in Europe, the Russo-Turkish War broke out, and Schroeter and his fellow shipmates were sent to Salonika, on the Greek coast, and thence to Smyrna. The duty was tedious and boring and discipline was maintained through a strict training regime. Close order drills, abandon ship drills, fire drills, repel boarder drills and cleaning and repairs occupied most of Schroeter's time over the next ten months. "Spit and polish" was often the mantra aboard such US Navy ships.

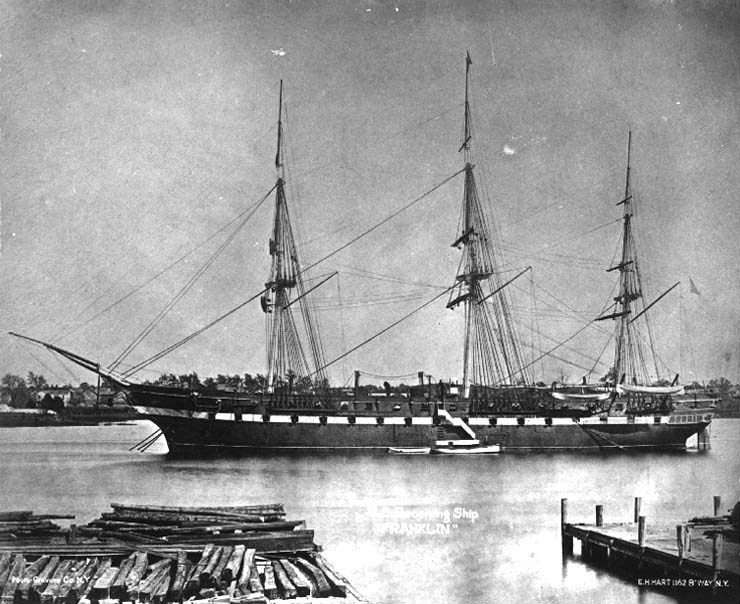
USS Franklin

In February 1878, the Alliance became Rear Admiral William E. Le Roy's flagship. The Alliance then sailed for Piraeus in Greece, the port for Athens. During ex-President Grant's stay in Greece the Alliance "rendered honors" to him on March 13. A few weeks later while at Piraeus, the ship received the King and Queen of Greece. They "remained a considerable time on board" aboard the Alliance which was the flagship for the US Navy flotilla. The King and Queen on their departure were "honored with the usual ceremonies as upon their arrival" on March 26. Whether Schroeter and his fellow Marines were impressed by such honored company is open to debate.

The Alliance sailed from the Eastern Mediterranean to beyond the Western end into Algiers and back to Villefranche visiting ports along the way. She then repeated the process and such was the routine until late 1879. She reached Boston on December 8, 1879, then sailed for Norfolk the following day, arriving there on the 14th. For the next five months, the ship lay under repairs at Norfolk. Schroeter and the other Marines were sent ashore for other duties.

Schroeter became a hospital guard until being assigned to the USRS Franklin. The Franklin had been a Civil War screw frigate until retired from active service on March 2, 1877. She was then recommissioned as a receiving ship, which was also known as a "barracks ship." He was transferred to the Marine Barracks in Norfolk on October 24, 1881, where he was honorably discharged November 4, 1881, from the USMC.

Schroeter was promoted to corporal on April 26, 1881, while aboard the USRS Franklin.

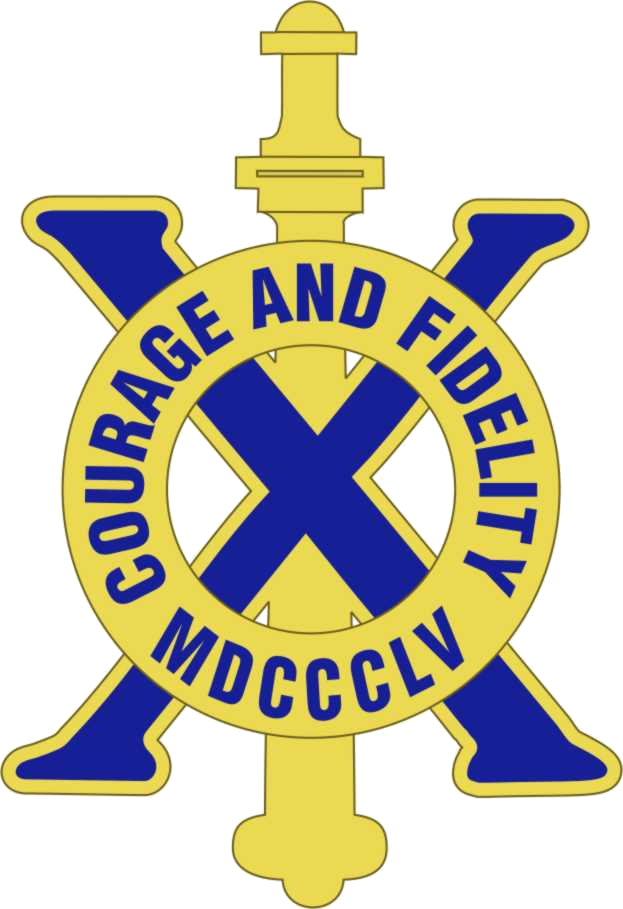
10th Infantry Regiment coat of arms

=== 1881–1886 ===
Schroeter volunteered for his fourth tour of duty as a soldier on November 14, 1881, and is listed by a Captain Craig as being of "Ft. Porter" near Porter, New York. (Note: Civil War friend named Edwin L. Hoopes and later business partner was living in the Porter area. It is likely he was visiting before he joined the US Army.) His birth is listed as Hanover, Germany, age 43. He had brown hair, brown eyes and fair complexion. His height is provided as 5 feet 6 1/4 inches. He served with the 10th Infantry Regiment in G Company as a sergeant until his expiration of service on November 13, 1886, while at the "camp on the Mesa Uncompahgre" in Colorado. He was described as being of excellent character.

=== 1886–1891 ===
9th Infantry Regiment coat of arms

Schroeter's fifth enlistment as a regular soldier started on November 24, 1886, at Denver, Colorado, as written by Lieutenant Borden. His place of birth is recorded as Hanover, Germany, now age 48, his eyes brown, hair brown, ruddy complexion with a height of 5 feet 6 1/4 inches. He served with the 9th Infantry Regiment, in C Company. The record shows this as his sixth enlistment, if his service in the Missouri volunteers during the Civil War is included. For many "Post Returns" or monthly roster reports, Schroeter was listed as a clerk serving with the headquarters company.

Schroeter was discharged on November 23, 1891, while at Whipple Barracks, Arizona Territory, as a corporal. His character was listed as "excellent."

=== 1891–1894 ===
Schroeter began his sixth regular tour of duty or his "enlistment 7" counting his Civil War Service, on November 24, 1891, while still at Whipple Barracks going back into C Company of the 9th Infantry Regiment. He was sworn in by Lieutenant McNutt, and now is age 53. He is listed as bring born in Hanover, Germany with brown eyes, brown hair "N. Fair" complexion. He is listed as 5 feet 5 3/4 inches tall.

Under "Special Order 242, A.Y.O.-94" Charles Schroeter was formally retired from the United States Army as a sergeant.

Schroeter, during his 30 years and 7 months of active service, is noted as having "sustained saber cuts on both arms and his left side, two saber cuts above his left ear, a bullet wound, and another wound on the back of his neck."

== Post military ==
The Masonic Square and Compasses

Schroeter settled in Buffalo, New York, founding and becoming the senior partner of "the firm Schroeter & Hoopes, dealers in cigars, tobacco and confectionery." His partner was Edwin Lewis Hoopes (also cited as Elwin Hoopes and Elwin Hooper in various records), another Civil War veteran. Schroeter became a member of the Grand Army of the Republic (William Richardson Post Number 254) and a Freemason.

In the 1900 US census he is enumerated as being born in July 1837 in Germany. He is listed as single and as a "boarder" living with the Hoopes family. In the 1910 US census and both the 1905 and 1915 New York state census he is at the same location and still a boarder with the Hoopes (Hoopers).

Schroeter's partner Edwin Hoopes died in 1913, but Schroeter continued to live with Edwin's son Charles L. Hoopes. Schroeter wrote a will in 1915 naming Elizabeth Hoopes, the daughter of Charles, as his beneficiary. (Note: Elizabeth Hoopes was born January 8, 1903, in New York and received a four-year college degree and became a junior high school teacher. After 1940 she married and apparently later divorced a Marvin W. Oliver (1919 New Mexico – 1992 New Mexico) because he remarried during her lifetime. She retained her married name and died on June 18, 1994, in San Diego. She has no known descendants.)

After the selling of his business, Schroeter moved to San Diego, California, with Charles Hoopes' family in 1918. While he is enumerated as living on 4027 Ingalls Street in the City of San Diego during the 1920 US census, San Diego City directories (1919, 1920 & 1921) show the Hoopes family lived at 4027 Jackdaw Street. The census street designation is likely in error. His age is noted as age 86 (should be 82), single and boarding with the same Hoopes family he was with in New York.

== Death and reburial ==
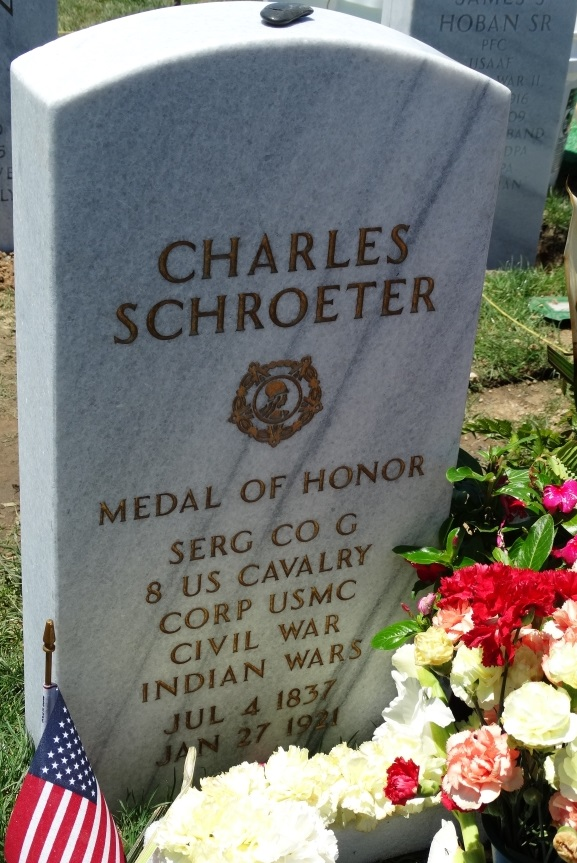
Grave marker of Charles Schroeter - Medal of Honor- Section 3-1052 - Miramar National Cemetery

In January 1921 Schroeter died aged 83 still living with the Hoopes (Hooper) family in San Diego. His will stated he wished his remains to be cremated and then interred locally under a pre-paid burial policy. A local Masonic Lodge (#35) held a memorial ceremony for him and placed a small obituary notice in the San Diego Union newspaper. No family members were found during a lengthy probate search conducted by the City that was closed in 1931, ten years after his death. More than a decade after his death, his remains were still not claimed. His cremains were placed in an unmarked pauper crypt with other unclaimed remains at Greenwood Memorial Park in San Diego.

About 2005, the Congressional Medal of Honor Society, whose members are Medal of Honor holders, tasked its Foundation to find the graves of several hundred missing Medal of Honor recipients. The mission of the Congressional Medal of Honor Foundation is to promote the Medal of Honor legacy, values and what it stands for. Laura Jowdy, an archivist with the Congressional Medal of Honor Society, conducted the primary research on Schroeter, as did the Congressional Medal of Honor Society of the United States under Don Morfe. Jowdy is quoted as saying, about Schroeter and other missing Medal of Honor dead, "It's important for these brave individuals not to be forgotten." Her research with the CMOHS on his service led the investigation to San Diego in 2010.

Captain Bill Heard, USNR retired, the Miramar National Cemetery Support Foundation's Public Information Officer, with the Congressional Medal of Honor Society, conducted local research for the unmarked burial location. With assistance of the San Diego History Center archivist, Jane Kenealy, Schroeter's remains were found in an unmarked crypt at Greenwood Memorial Park.

Don Morfe of the Medal of Honor Historical Society of the United States provided a "commemorative plaque to mark the location of the remains". Heard was then instrumental in convincing the National Cemetery Administration that the Charles G. Schroeter who died in 1921 was the same Charles Schroeter who received the Medal of Honor in 1870 for his actions in 1869. In 2013, that Foundation sent a Medal of Honor plaque to the cemetery for placement with his remains. Cemetery staff were unaware that they had a Medal of Honor recipient until that point of time. Following receipt of the plaque, Cathy Fiorelli, director of Greenwood Memorial Park who also serves on the board of the Miramar cemetery's foundation, decided that Schroeter should be buried at a national cemetery as it seemed "...more befitting, proper and appropriate as the final resting place for a war veteran and Medal of Honor recipient."

Miramar National Cemetery Foundation Director Charles Bailey submitted the first request to transfer the remains of Charles Schroeter. After providing more details and facts, the second formal request by Bailey was successfully submitted. Fiorelli then filed a request to transfer the remains to Miramar National Cemetery, which was approved.

On July 8, 2015, Schroeter's remains were escorted from Greenwood Memorial Park to the new (dedicated 2010) Miramar National Cemetery by Patriot Guard Riders. The following day, July 9, 2015, a somber military ceremony took place as Schroeter was reburied with full military honors. A horse-drawn hearse carried his remains with an honor guard of thirty soldiers from the 11th Armored Cavalry Regiment from Fort Irwin, California. Also present were flag bearing Patriot Guard Riders, two living Medal of Honor recipients, Civil War re-enactors, and an Army band with a few military and cemetery officials providing their respects. Standing in for the family, Douglas Ledbetter, Director of Miramar National Cemetery, was presented the American flag that covered Schroeter's remains.

== Medal of Honor citation ==

Rank and organization: Private, Company G, 8th U.S. Cavalry.
Place and date: At Chiricahua Mountains, Ariz., October 20, 1869.
Birth: Lindberg, Germany
Date of issue: February 14, 1870.

Citation: The President of the United States of America, in the name of Congress, takes pleasure in presenting the Medal of Honor to Private Charles Schroeter, United States Army, for gallantry in action on October 20, 1869, while serving with Company G, 8th U.S. Cavalry, in action at Chiricahua Mountains, Arizona Territory.

== See also ==
- List of Medal of Honor recipients for the Indian Wars § S
