= Mayi =

Mayi may refer to

- Mayi, a surname
- Mayi (马邑, "Horse Town"), a former Chinese town in what is now Shuozhou, Shanxi
- Mayi clan, a clan of Indian Muslims

== See also ==
- Battle of Mayi (133 BC) between Han China and the Xiongnu
- Mayi Bas, a village in Iran
- Mbuji-Mayi, a city in the Democratic Republic of Congo
- Eacles mayi, a moth
- Taranis mayi, a sea snail
- Mayi-Mayi, another name for Mai-Mai, a community-based militia group in the Democratic Republic of the Congo
- Mayi-Kulan and Mayi-Kutuna languages of Australia
- Ma-i, an ancient Philippine state
