= Eacles callopteris =

Scientific classification
- Domain: Eukaryota
- Kingdom: Animalia
- Phylum: Arthropoda
- Class: Insecta
- Order: Lepidoptera
- Family: Saturniidae
- Genus: Eacles
- Species: E. callopteris

Binomial name
- Eacles callopteris Rothschild, 1907

Species of moth

Eacles callopteris is a moth in the family Saturniidae. It is found in Bolivia, Ecuador and Peru. It is very similar in appearance to Eacles acuta.
