= Eacles silkae =

Scientific classification
- Kingdom: Animalia
- Phylum: Arthropoda
- Class: Insecta
- Order: Lepidoptera
- Family: Saturniidae
- Genus: Eacles
- Species: E. silkae

Binomial name
- Eacles silkae Brechlin & Meister 2011

Species of moth

Eacles silkae is a moth in the family Saturniidae. It is found in French Guiana.
