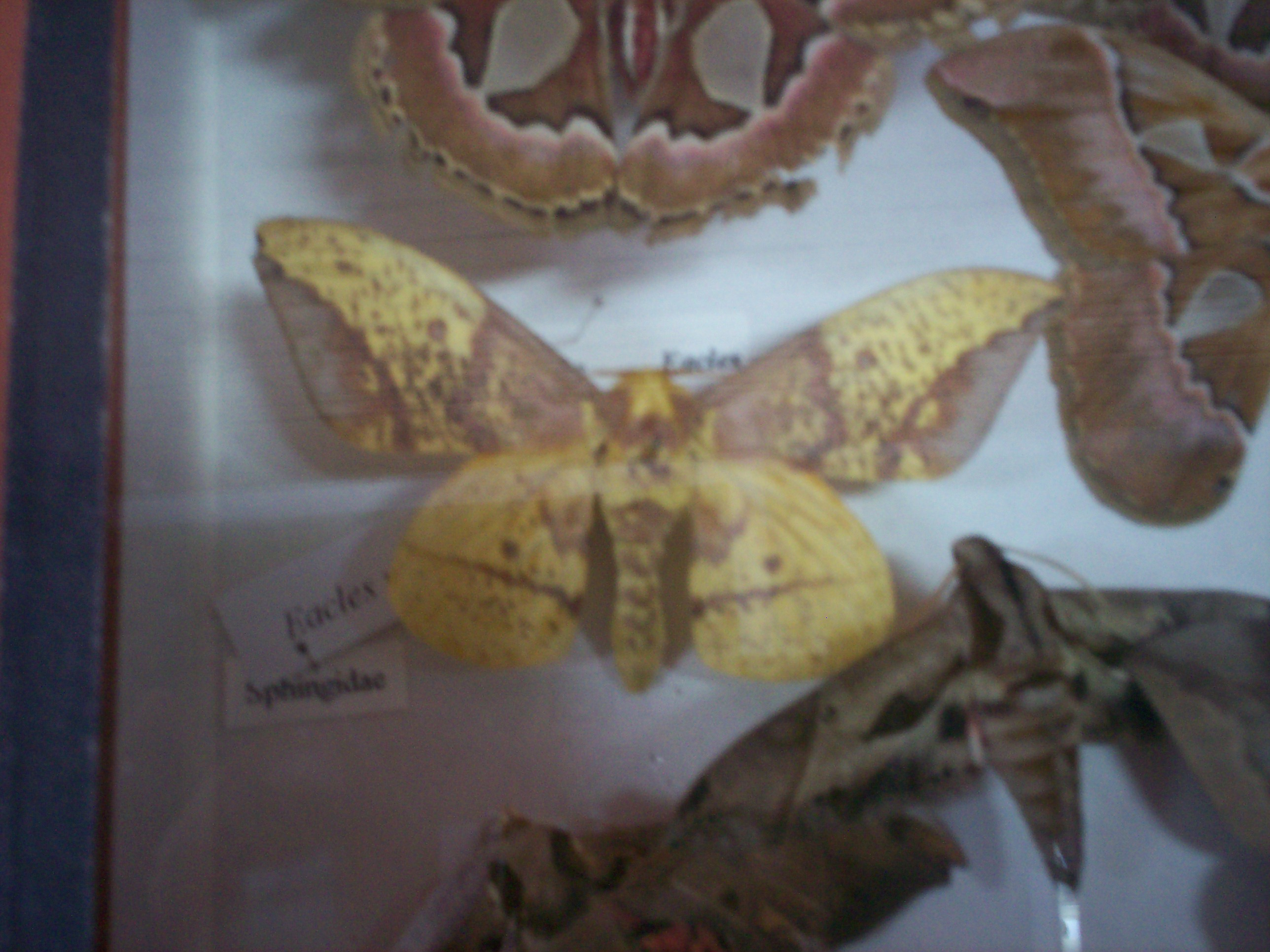

Scientific classification
- Kingdom: Animalia
- Phylum: Arthropoda
- Class: Insecta
- Order: Lepidoptera
- Family: Saturniidae
- Genus: Eacles
- Species: E. magnifica

Binomial name
- Eacles magnifica Walker, 1855

= Eacles magnifica =

Species of moth

Eacles magnifica is a moth of the family Saturniidae. It is found in Mexico, Guatemala, Nicaragua, Panama, Brazil, Argentina, and Paraguay.

== Subspecies ==
- Eacles magnifica magnifica
- Eacles magnifica opaca (Paraguay, Bolivia, Brazil, Uruguay, Argentina)
