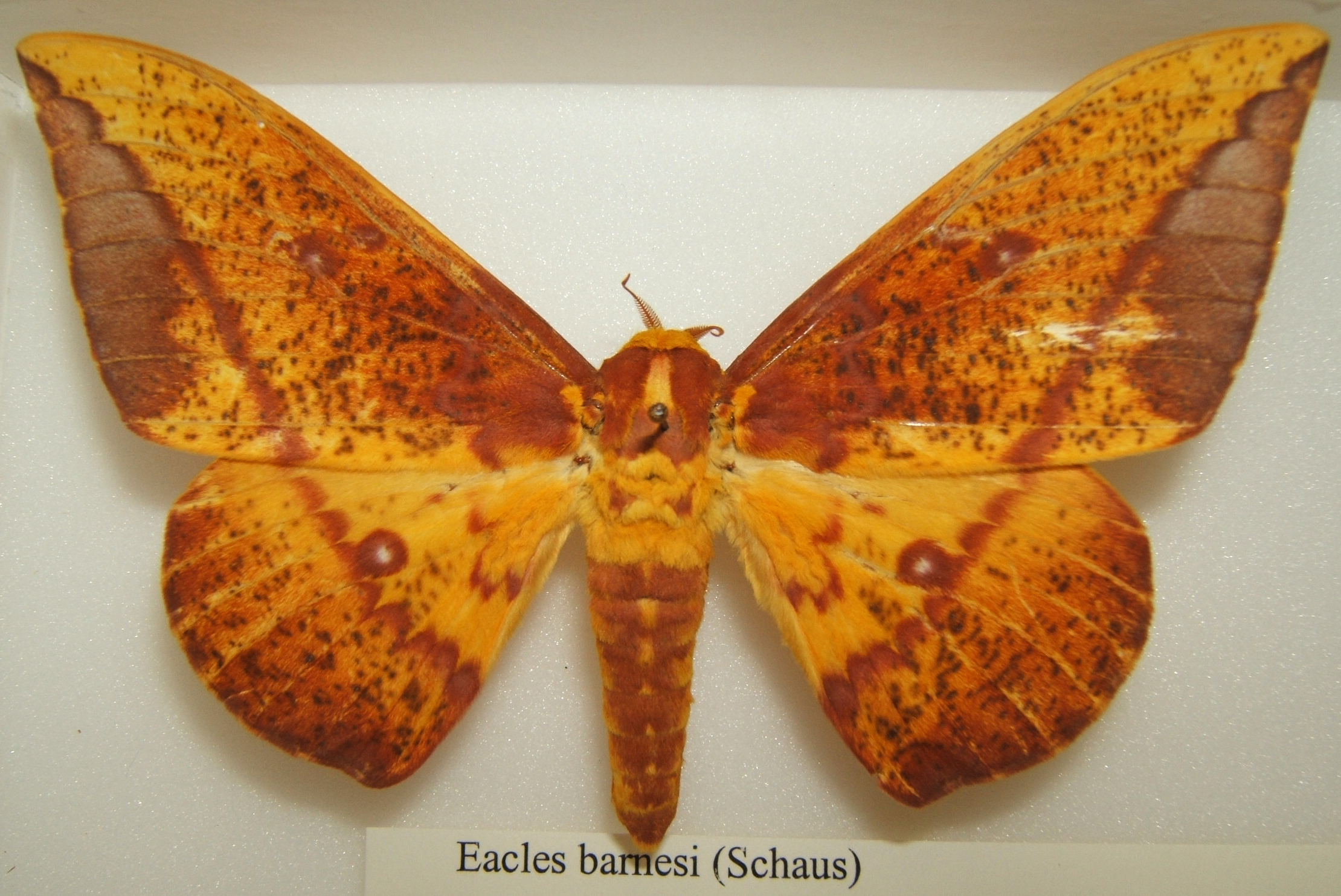
- Eacles barnesi male

Scientific classification
- Domain: Eukaryota
- Kingdom: Animalia
- Phylum: Arthropoda
- Class: Insecta
- Order: Lepidoptera
- Family: Saturniidae
- Genus: Eacles
- Species: E. barnesi

Binomial name
- Eacles barnesi Schaus, 1905

= Eacles barnesi =

Species of moth

Eacles barnesi is a moth of the family Saturniidae. It is found in South America, including French Guiana, Brazil and Peru.
