= Eacles ducalis =

Scientific classification
- Kingdom: Animalia
- Phylum: Arthropoda
- Class: Insecta
- Order: Lepidoptera
- Family: Saturniidae
- Genus: Eacles
- Species: E. ducalis

Binomial name
- Eacles ducalis Walker, 1855

Synonyms
- Eacles penelope ducalis Walker, 1855

Species of moth

Eacles ducalis is a moth in the family Saturniidae. It is found in Brazil and Argentina.
