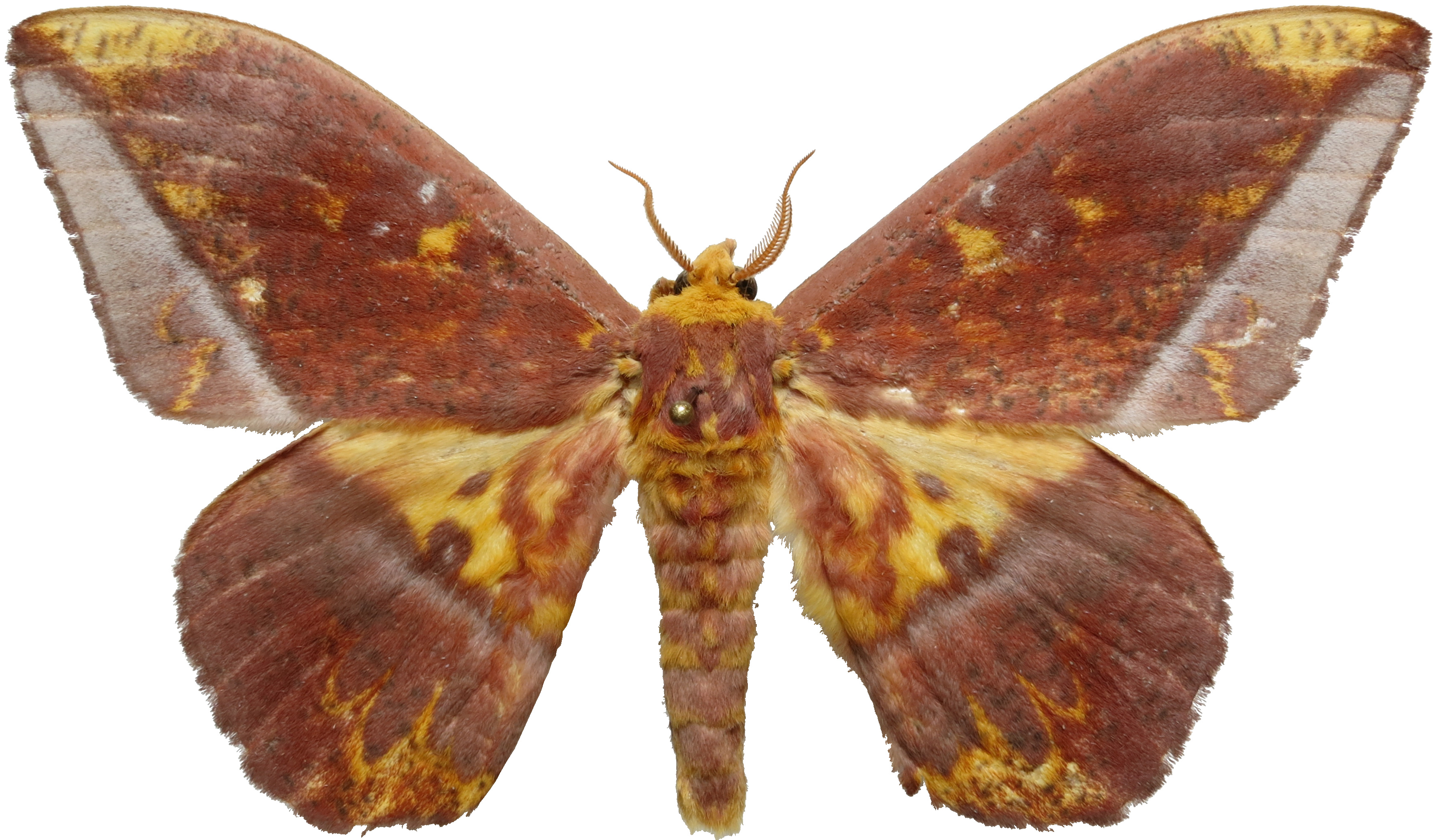
- Eacles adoxa male

Scientific classification
- Domain: Eukaryota
- Kingdom: Animalia
- Phylum: Arthropoda
- Class: Insecta
- Order: Lepidoptera
- Family: Saturniidae
- Genus: Eacles
- Species: E. adoxa

Binomial name
- Eacles adoxa Jordan, 1910

= Eacles adoxa =

Species of moth

Eacles adoxa is a moth in the family Saturniidae. It is found in Venezuela, Peru, Guyana, French Guiana, Ecuador, Colombia, Brazil and Bolivia. It is yellow with heavy red-orange speckling all over the wings. Orange eyespots are located in the center of each wing.
