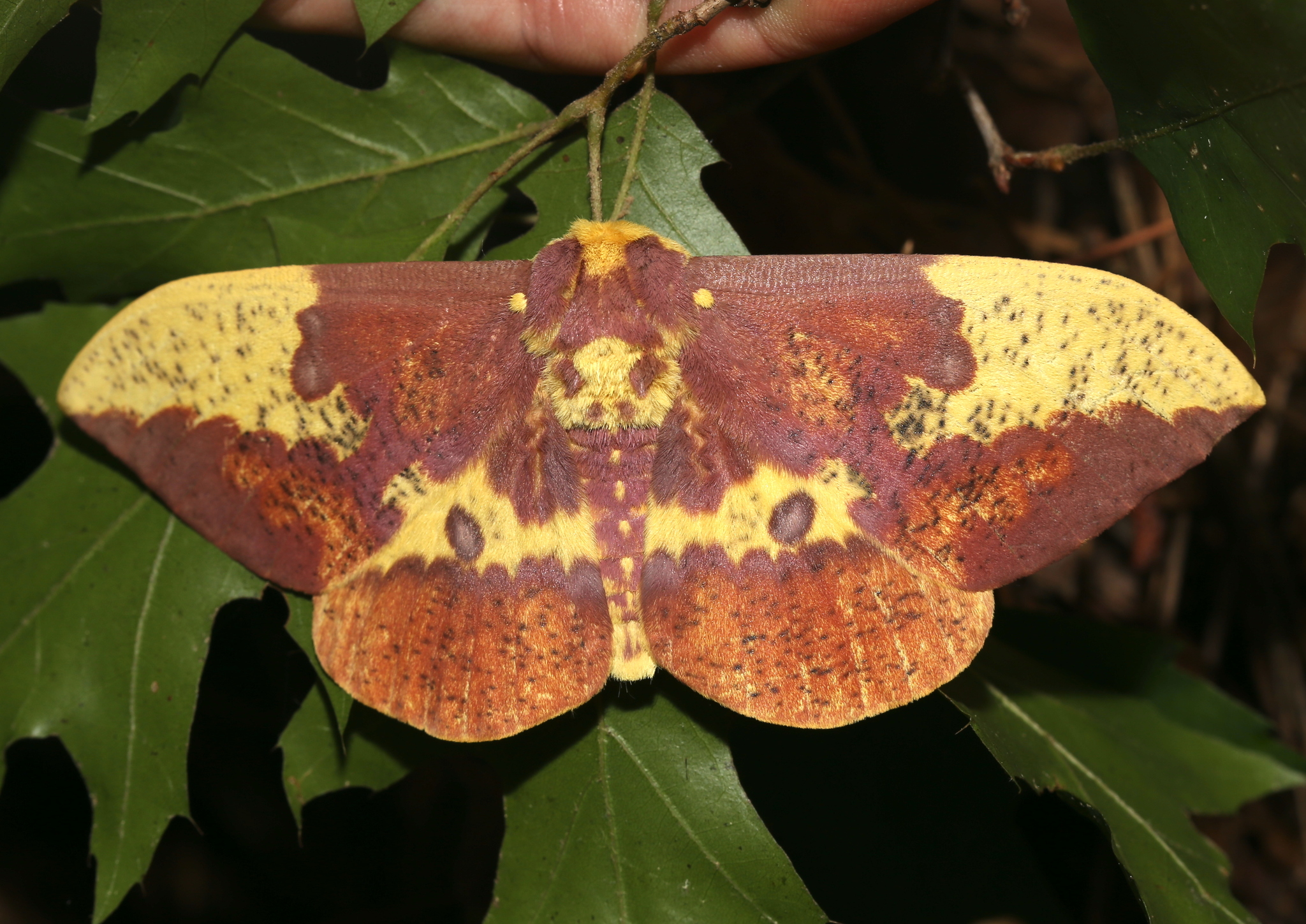
- Adult
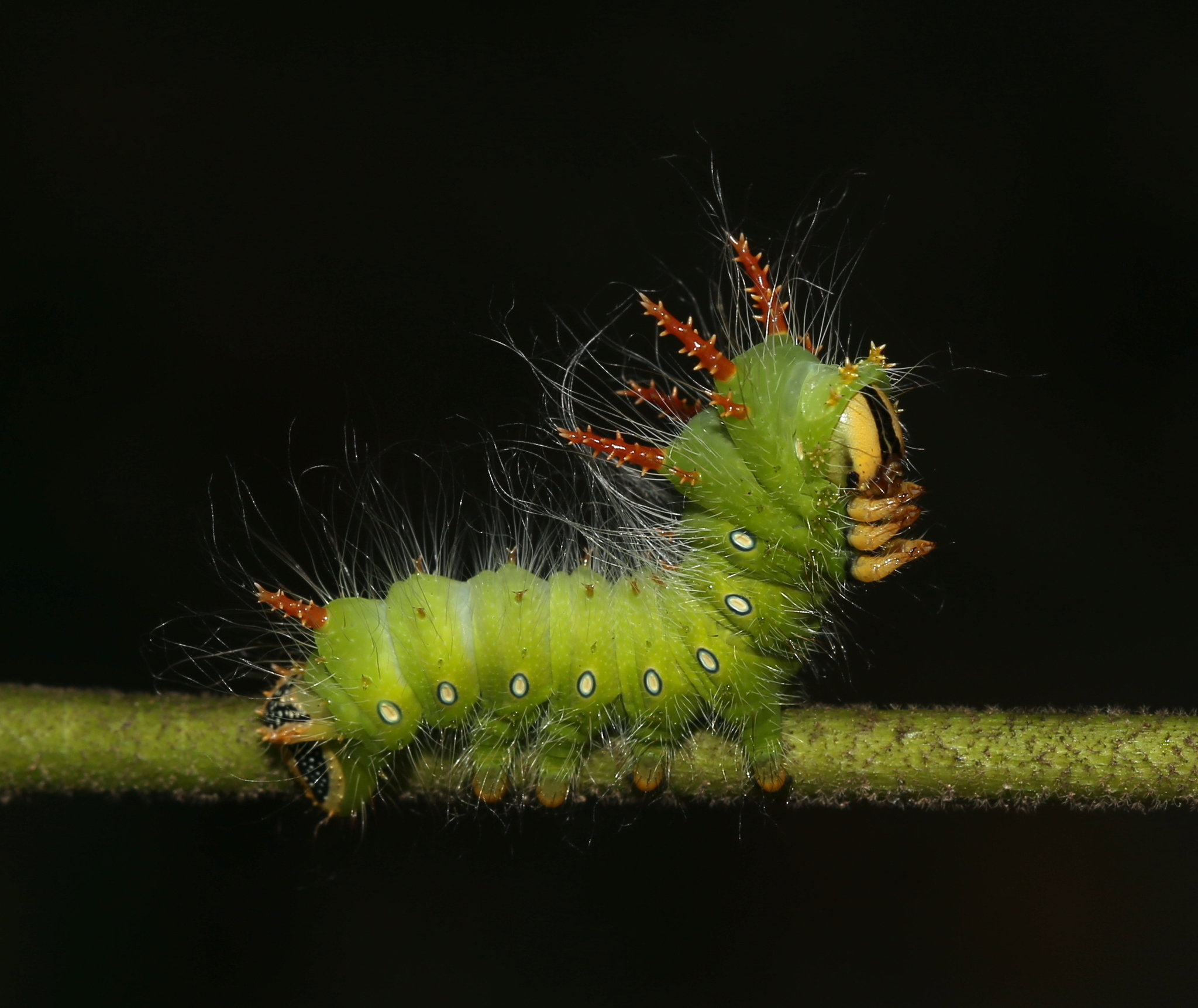
- Larva on Carya ovata

Scientific classification
- Kingdom: Animalia
- Phylum: Arthropoda
- Clade: Pancrustacea
- Class: Insecta
- Order: Lepidoptera
- Family: Saturniidae
- Genus: Eacles
- Species: E. imperialis

Binomial name
- Eacles imperialis (Drury, 1773)

Synonyms
- Phalaena imperialis Drury, 1773

= Eacles imperialis =

Species of moth

Eacles imperialis, the imperial moth, is a member of the family Saturniidae and subfamily Ceratocampinae. It is found mainly in the East of South America and North America, from the center of Argentina to south Canada. The species was first described by Dru Drury in 1773.

== Description ==
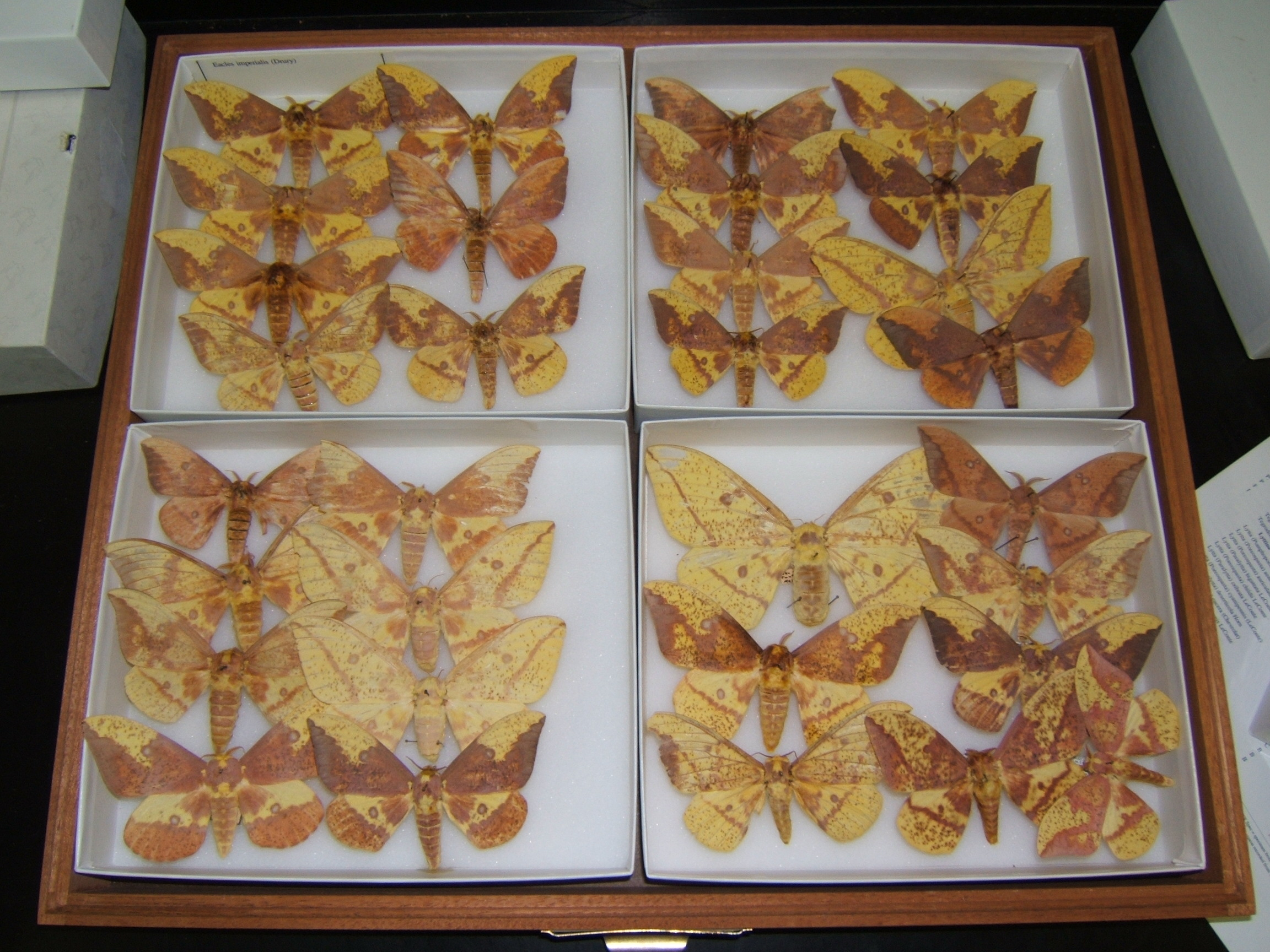
Examples of Eacles imperialis variation

The imperial moth has evolved to look like rotting leaves. Here is a nearly identical poplar tree leaf.

The wingspan of an adult is between 80 and 175 mm (3 1/8 and 6 7/8 inches). There is a high amount of variation within this species. The colors of the adult are always primarily yellow with red, brown, and purple blotches but can vary distinctly on this. Light and dark morphs of this species are found in both the northern and southern regions of their range. Individuals from the northern regions of their native range may tend to have fewer dark markings. Larvae can be small (approximately 10–15 mm long) and orange with black transverse bands and large spines in the first instar, to 3–5.5 inches (75–100 mm) long in the fifth instar with long hairs and shorter spines and color morphs varying between dark brown and burgundy with white spiracle patches, and green with yellow spiracle patches.

== Distribution ==
Imperial moths (their many regional morphs, subspecies, and sibling species) range from Argentina to Canada and from the Rocky Mountains to the Atlantic Coast. This species is the widest-ranging and northernmost in its genus Eacles. Nominate Eacles imperialis imperialis has been recorded historically from New England and southern Canada, south to the Florida Keys, and as far west as Nebraska. E. i. imperialis may not appear in Massachusetts today except for a population located on Martha's Vineyard. The true northern limits of the nominate's range are unknown because of possible confusion with subspecies E. i. pini in existing records. Subspecies E. i. pini occurs in coniferous and transition zone woodlands at the northern edges of the New England and Great Lakes States and northward into Canada. In the southwest, it is replaced by the closely related E. oslari. Other subspecies are found in Mexico and South America. Subspecies E. i. magnifica can be found in Brazil and surrounding regions.

== Subspecies ==
The subspecies of Eacles imperialis:

- E. i. imperialis (Drury, 1773)
- E. i. pini (Michener, 1950)
- E. i. cacicus (Boisduval, 1868)
- E. i. hallawachsae (Brechlin & Meister, 2011)
- E. i. quintanensis (Lemaire, 1971)
- E. i. decoris (Rothschild, 1907)
- E. i. tucumana (Rothschild, 1907)
- E. i. opaca (Burmeister, 1878)
- E. i. piurensis (Brechlin & Meister, 2011)
- E. i. nobilis (Neumoegen, 1891)
- E. i. magnifica (Walker, 1855)
- E. i. anchicayensis (Lemaire, 1971)

== Status ==
Eacles imperialis is one of a few saturniid species in a regional decline throughout the northeastern US, with some New England states lacking records for many decades. Reasons for the decline have been proposed to be the use of pesticide, insecticides, and herbicides in commercial farming, metal halide street lamps, and the introduction of parasitoids in the attempt to control the spongy moth population. A population on Martha's Vineyard, Massachusetts, has been the subject of scientific and local political activity, especially concerning the preservation of the sensitive frost-bottom oak/pine habitat. E. imperialis is certainly a common species of Mid-Atlantic states, Appalachia, the Ohio Valley, and Deep South regions, and is associated with forest, rural and suburban habitats. It is possible that to the north, E. imperialis requires specific habitat and that the increasing fragmentation of niches such as coastal or montane pine barrens is a factor.

== Life cycle ==
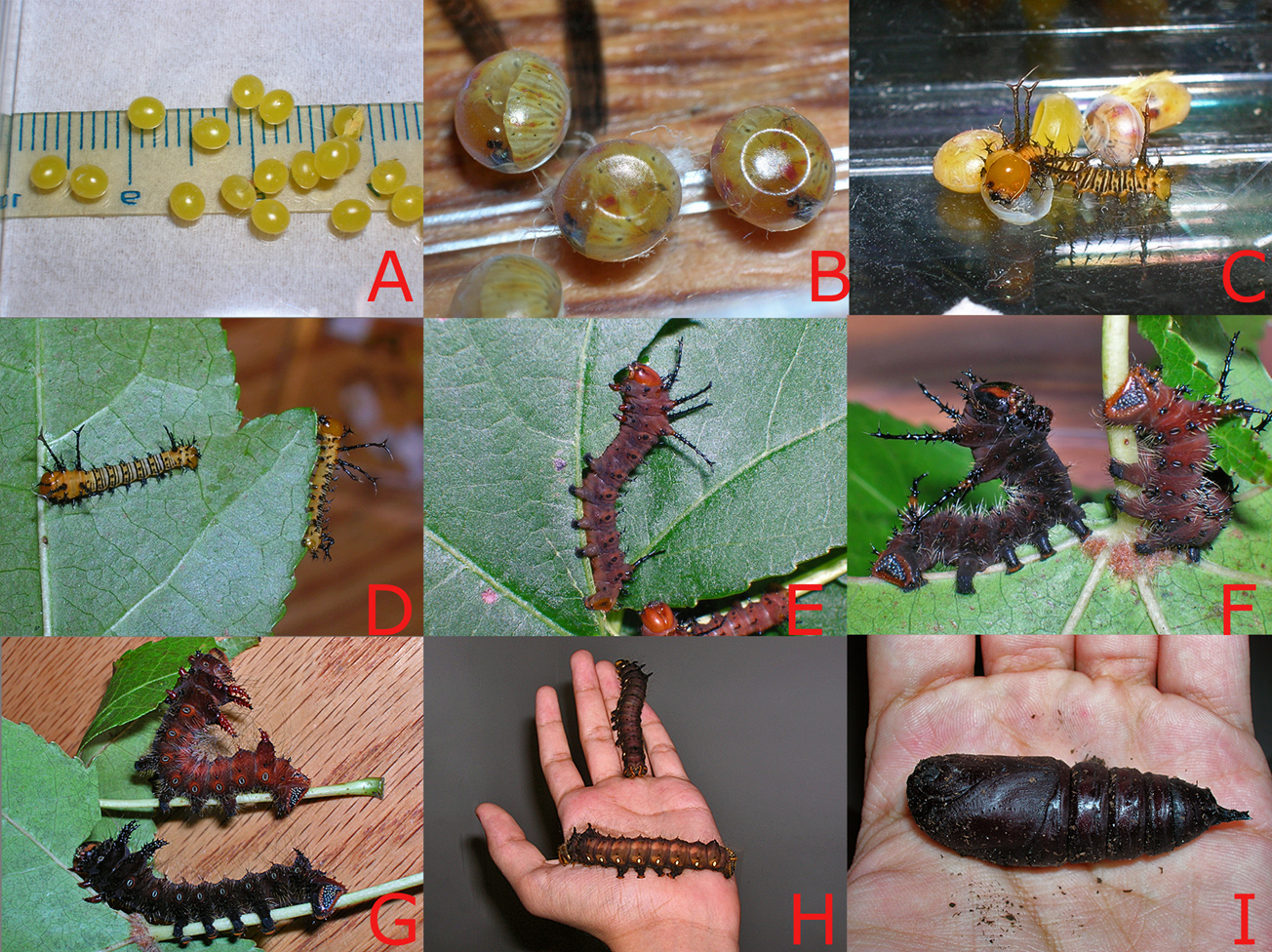
Imperial moth (Eacles imperialis) development from egg to pupa

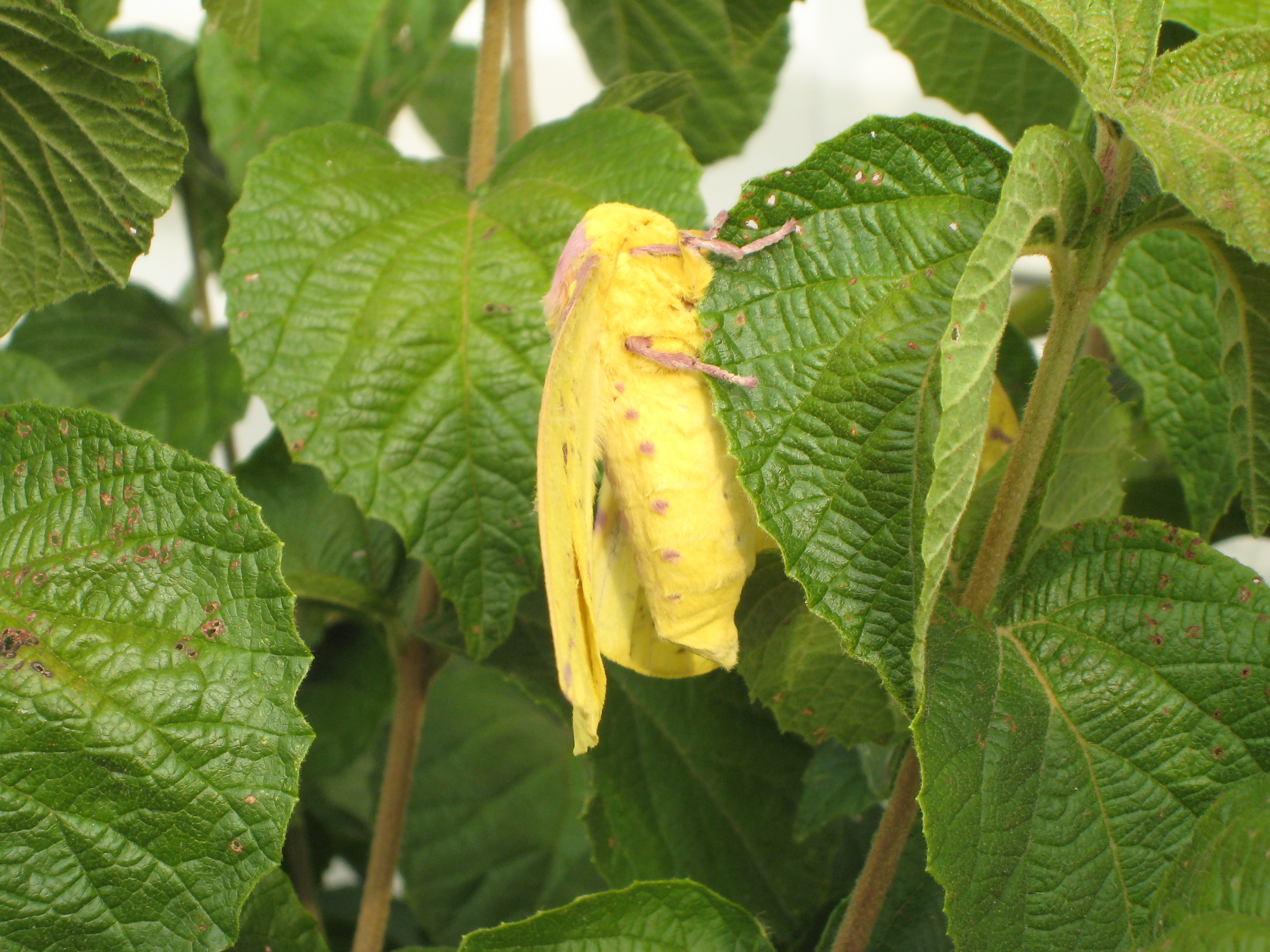
Adult, side view

In Florida and other southern areas, a few adults emerge in spring or early summer, but most emerge in late summer. There is only one brood a year.

Imperial moth larvae are polyphagous with many recorded hosts. However, there are probably regional differences in food preferences. The following plant species are the most commonly reported hosts for the imperial moth: pine species, maple species, oak species, sweetgum, and sassafras.

=== Egg ===
The female will lay eggs at dusk. It will do so either singly or in groups of two to five on either side of a host plant leaf. The eggs hatch in roughly ten days to two weeks. Newly hatched larvae will eat the shell of the egg they emerged from.

=== Larva ===
At the end of each instar, a small amount of silk is spun on the major vein of a leaf. The larva then latches onto the silk with its anal claspers and prolegs and begins to molt. It first becomes dormant and undergoes apolysis, then after an additional day or so, undergoes ecdysis. The larva emerges from its old exoskeleton, puffs up, and hardens as it enters the next instar. This species will sometimes eat the old exoskeleton for protein nutrition.

Similar to many other Saturniidae larvae, the imperial moth has five instars.

First instar

- The first instar generally lasts a short period of time. First-instar larvae appear orange with transverse black bands and have two large scoli with white filaments at their ends on the second and third thoracic segments and a single large scoli with white filament on the eighth thoracic segment. All other thoracic segments have shorter scoli.

Second instar

- Much darker than first instar larvae. Scoli are smaller in relation to body size. Fine hairs are beginning to emerge on the body of this instar.

Third instar

- Scoli continue to shorten as body size increases. Pigmentation of the head becomes darker.

Fourth instar

- Scoli continue to shorten. Hairs on this instar much longer now. Color variation begins to appear.

Fifth instar

- Larvae are fully grown at this instar and approximately 3–5.5 inches (75–100 mm) in length. They can be highly variable in color morphs with individuals most commonly being dark brown, burgundy, or green. The area around the spiracles is white in dark brown morphs and yellow in green morphs. Dark brown morphs may also have burnt orange patches running dorsally and surrounding the spiracles along the sides. At the end of this instar the larvae will burrow into the soil and pupate.

=== Pupa ===
Pupae are dark brown and have spines on their posterior to aid in emergence from their soil burrow. Abdominal segments are moveable but are unable to telescope because of flanges on the anterior margins of the abdomen. Female gonopores appear as two longitudinal slits on the fourth abdominal segment. Male gonopores appear as two short tubercles on the fourth abdominal segment.

=== Adult ===
Adults can have a wingspan of approximately 3–7 inches (80–174 mm). Adults will emerge once a year to mate. Emergence takes place at sunrise and mating will take place in the following night hours of the day. In the northern part of their range, they tend to emerge mid-summer (June–August), while in the southern part, they tend to emerge at more varied times (April–October). Males tend to emerge days earlier than females. Once a pair has been linked in a mating event, they are more vulnerable to predators, particularly foragers.

As with all of Saturniidae, the adults do not feed. Their mouth parts have been reduced.

== Sexual dimorphism ==
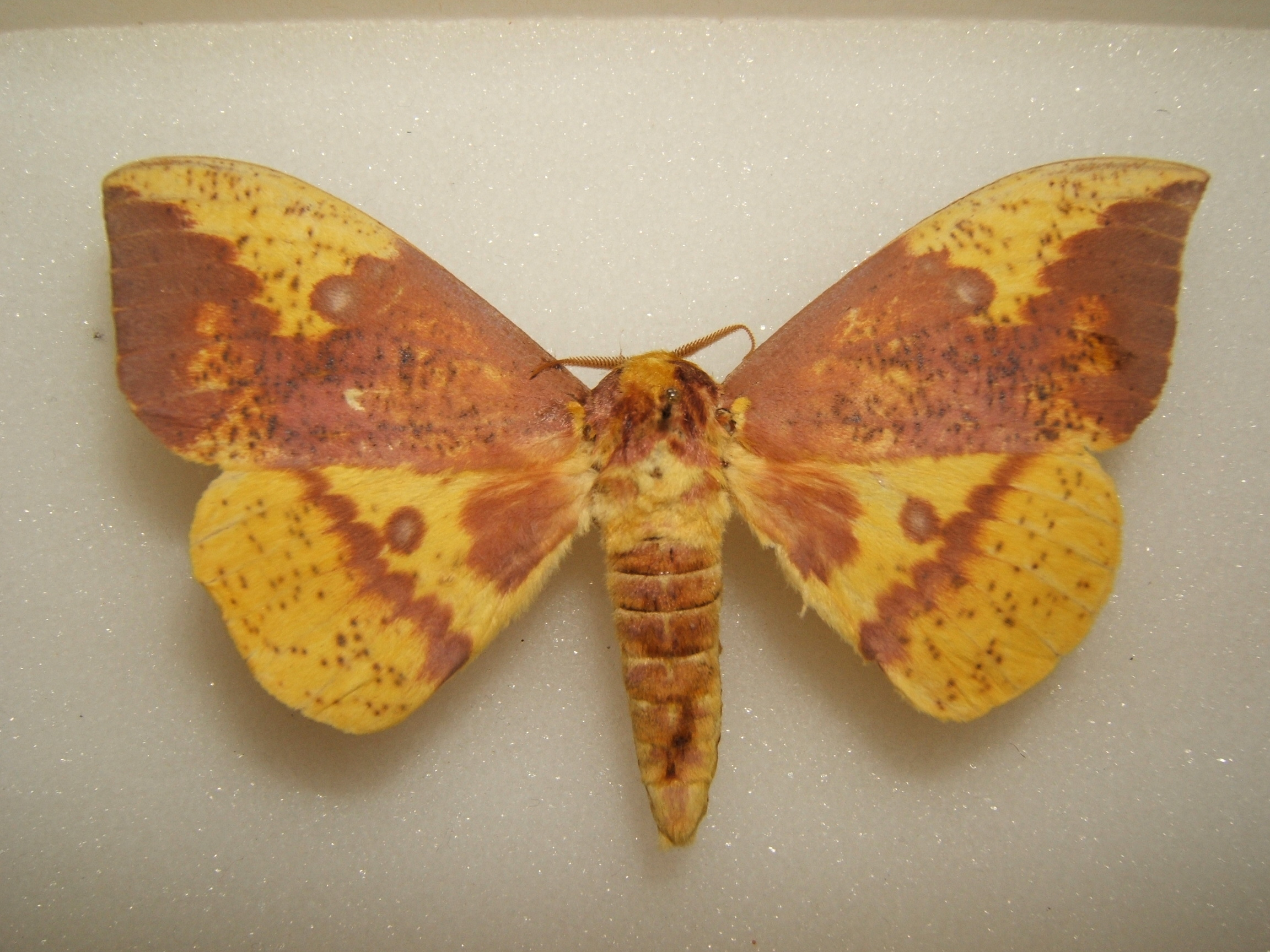
Male Eacles imperialis

Sexual dimorphism is present in the adult stages of this species:

Male

- More heavily marked with blotches of red, brown, and purple.
- Generally have larger, broader antennae compared to females to aid in the detection of pheromones released by females.
- Males have a spot of purple on the ventral side of the ninth abdominal segment.

Female

- Generally larger overall and have a larger abdomen because of their egg-filled ovarioles.
- Generally more yellow than males.
- Have simple antennae throughout life.

== Host plants ==
Larvae feed on a variety of host plants from Coniferous and deciduous trees to shrubs. Examples of some are:

- Pinus (pines)
- Quercus (oaks)
- Acer (maples)
- Liquidambar styraciflua (sweet gum)
- Sassafras albidum (sassafras)
- Eucalyptus
- Acer negundo (box elder)
- Picea abies (Norway spruce)

The E. i. pini subspecies feeds almost exclusively on pine and is normally found on Pinus strobus and Pinus resinosa with limited records from other pine species and Picea glauca.

On Martha's Vineyard, E. i. imperialis feeds almost exclusively on pitch pine (Pinus rigida).
