= Eacles =

- Imperial moth (Eacles imperialis), naturally camouflaged to look like leaf litter, shown with a nearly identical yellow poplar leaf

Scientific classification
- Domain: Eukaryota
- Kingdom: Animalia
- Phylum: Arthropoda
- Class: Insecta
- Order: Lepidoptera
- Family: Saturniidae
- Subfamily: Ceratocampinae
- Genus: Eacles; Hübner, 1819

Species
- See text

Synonyms
- Ceracampa Kirby & Spence, 1828; Basilona Boisduval, 1868; Crenudia Burmeister, 1880

Genus of moths

Eacles is a genus of moths in the family Saturniidae. They are native to the Americas. The genus was erected by Jacob Hübner in 1819.

== Species ==
The genus includes the following species:

- Eacles acuta Schaus, 1905
- Eacles adoxa Jordan, 1910
- Eacles barnesi Schaus, 1905
- Eacles bertrandi Lemaire, 1981
- Eacles callopteris W. Rothschild, 1907
- Eacles camposportoi Mendes, 1937
- Eacles canaima Feige, 1971
- Eacles cuscoensis Brechlin & Meister, 2009
- Eacles ducalis Walker, 1855
- Eacles fairchildi May & Oiticica, 1941
- Eacles guianensis Schaus, 1905
- Eacles imperialis (Drury, 1773)
- Eacles kaechi (Brechlin & Meister, 2011)
- Eacles lauroi Oiticica, 1938
- Eacles lemairei Rego Barros & Tangerini, 1973
- Eacles magnifica Walker, 1855
- Eacles manuelita Oiticica, 1941
- Eacles masoni Schaus, 1896
- Eacles mayi Schaus, 1920
- Eacles ormondei Schaus, 1889
- Eacles oslari Rothschild, 1907
- Eacles paraadoxa Brechlin & Meister, 2009
- Eacles penelope (Cramer, 1775)
- Eacles silkae (Brechlin & Meister, 2011)

== Gallery ==
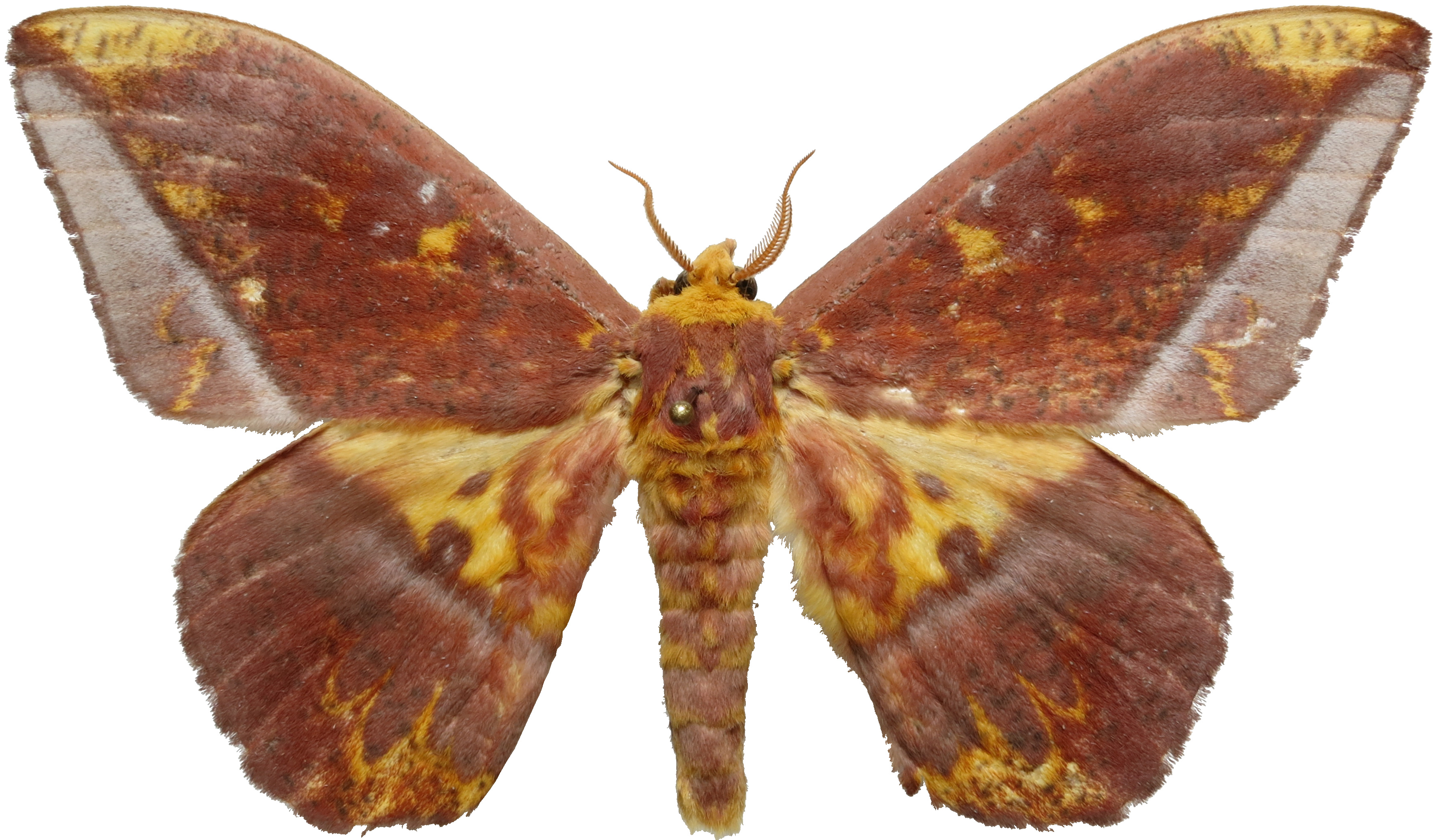
E. adoxa male

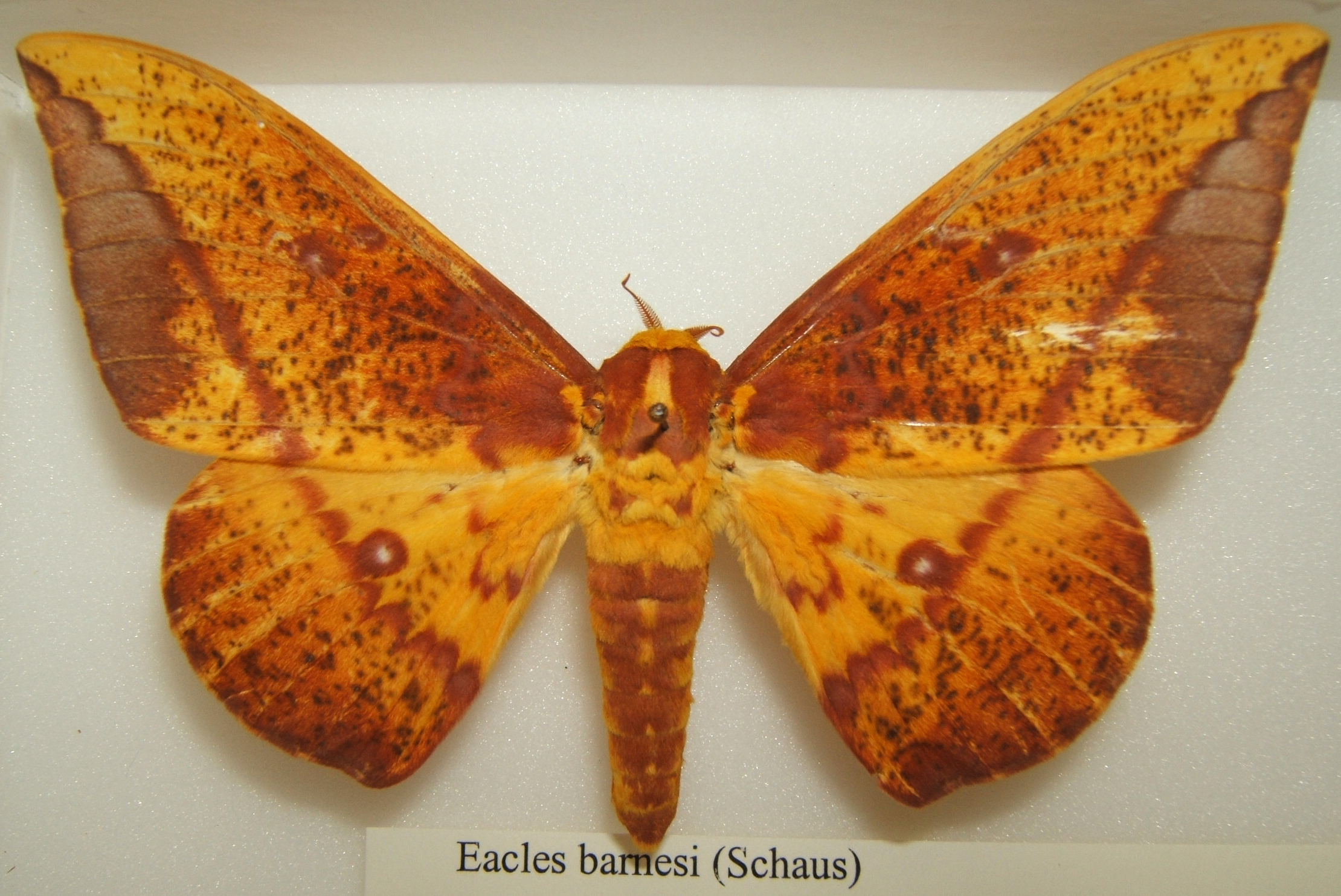
E. barnesi male

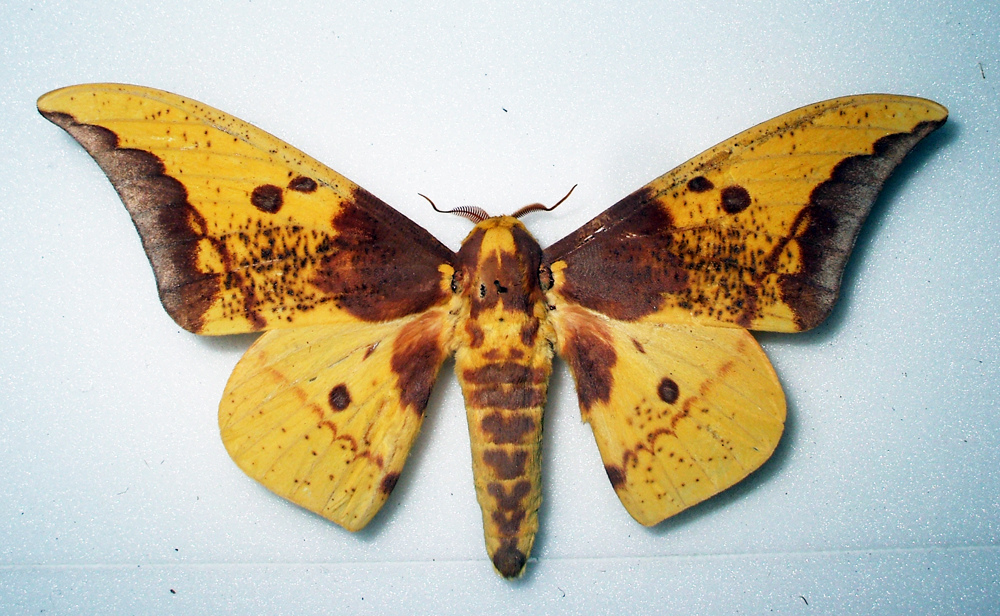
E. imperialis male

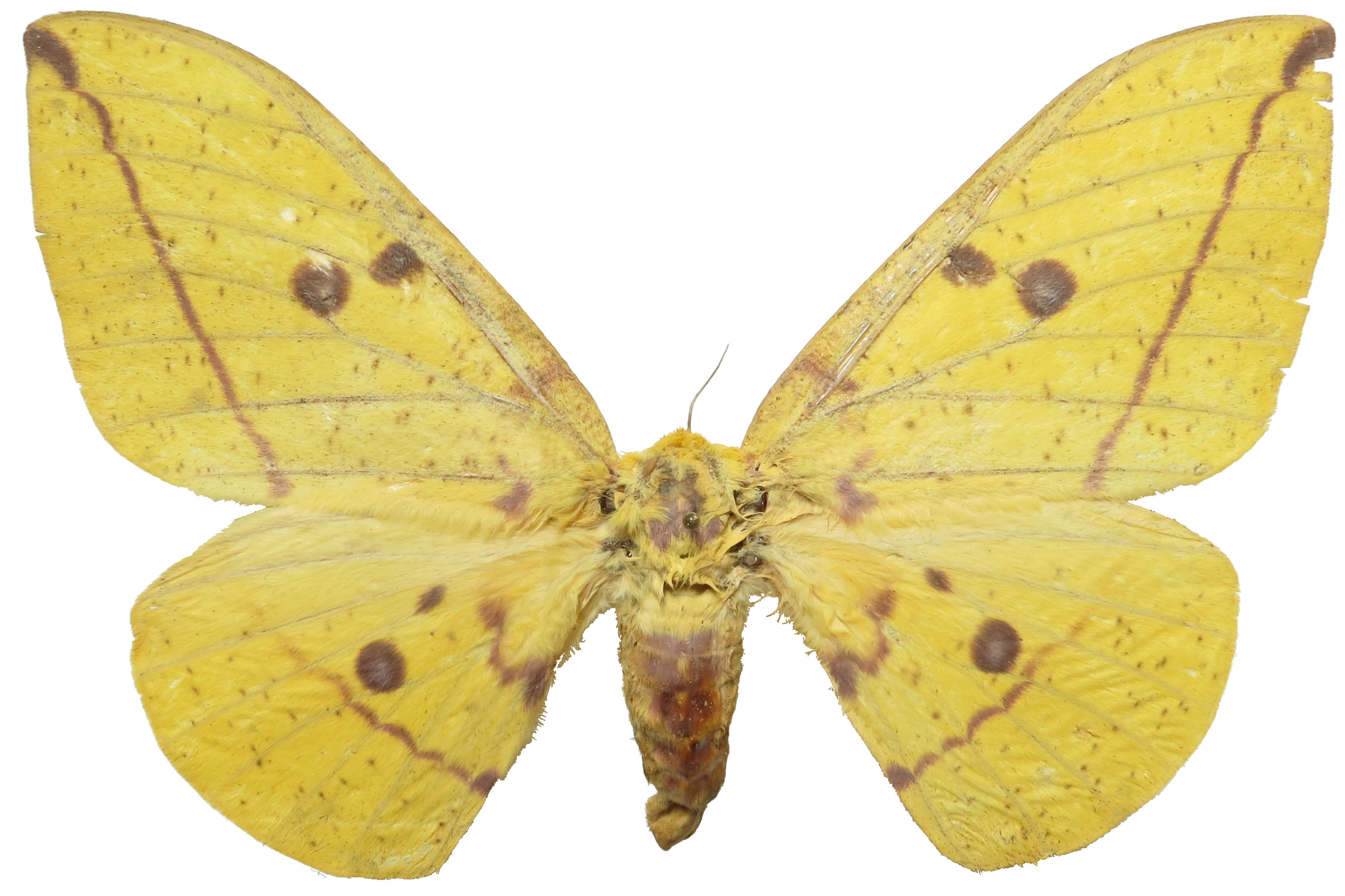
E. imperialis cacicus female

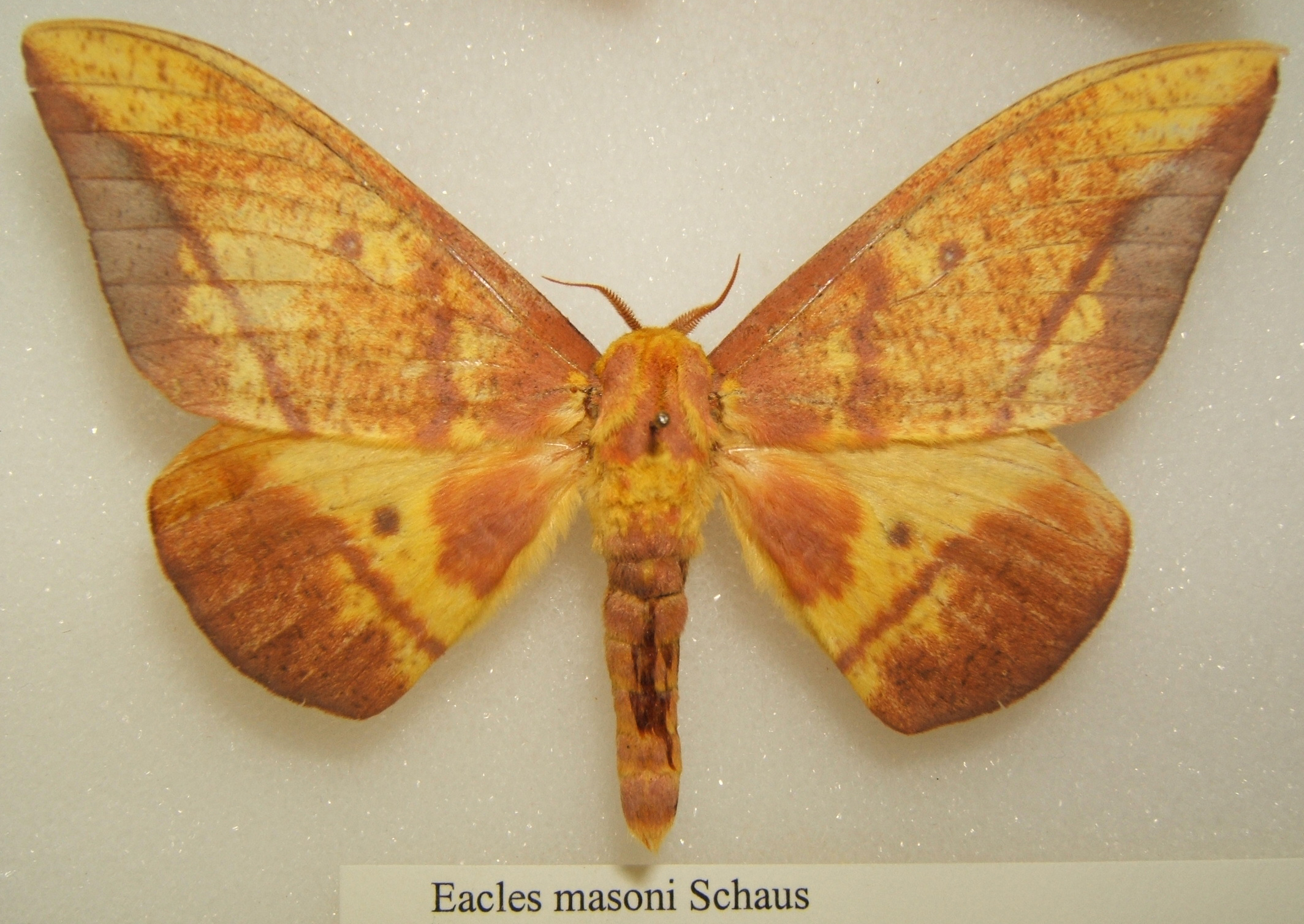
E. masoni male

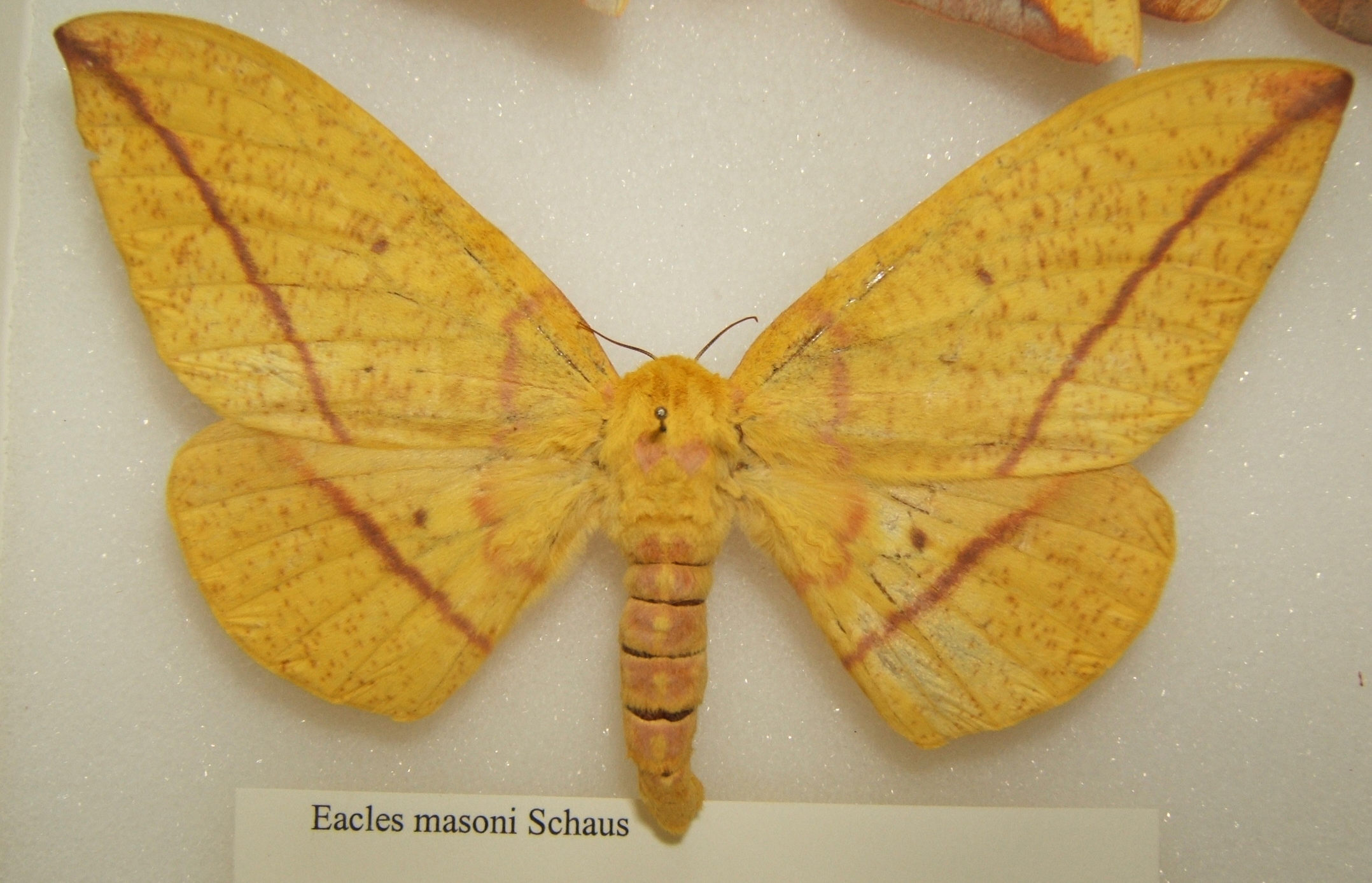
E. masoni female

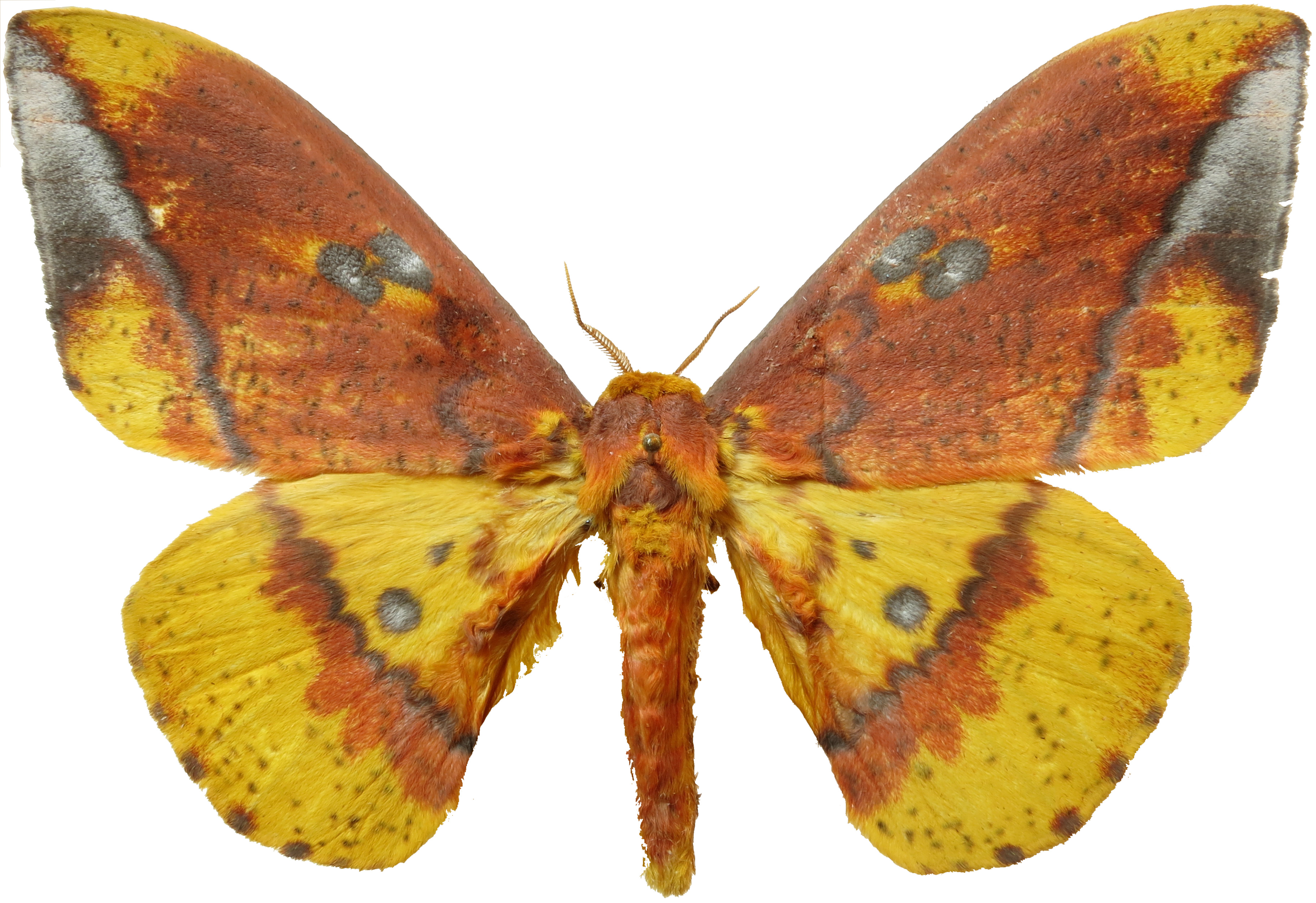
E. ormondei male

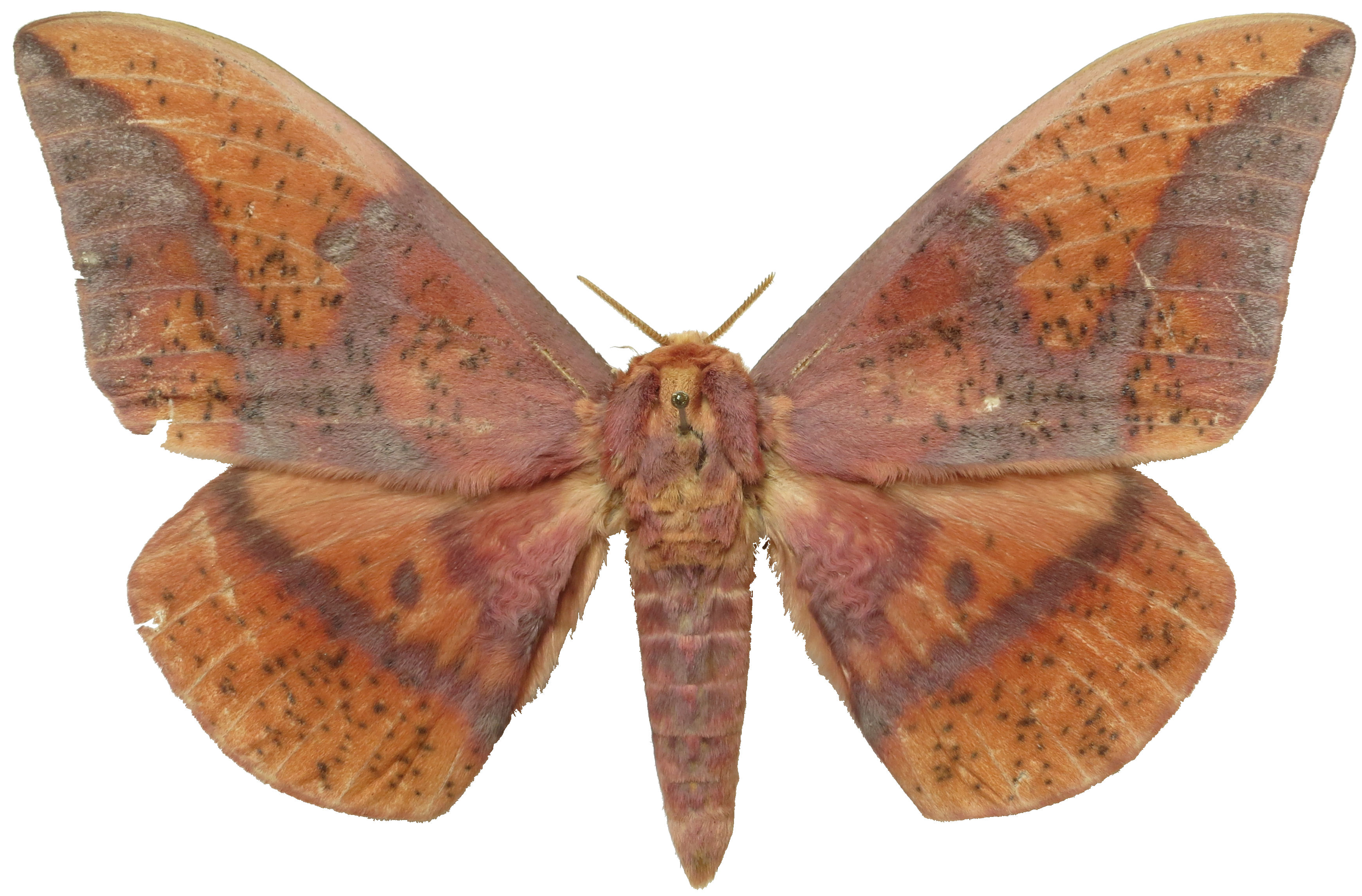
E. oslari male

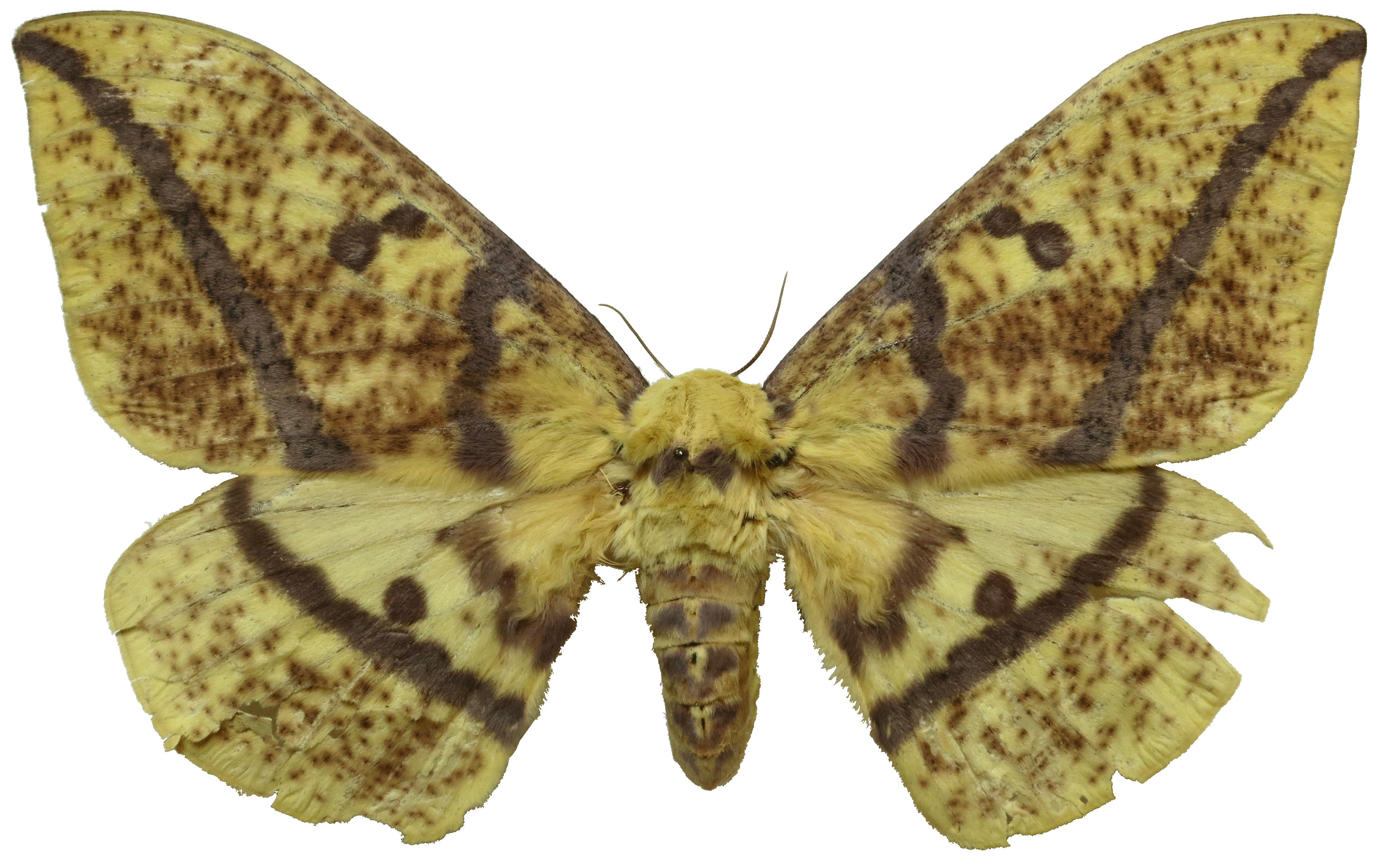
E. oslari female

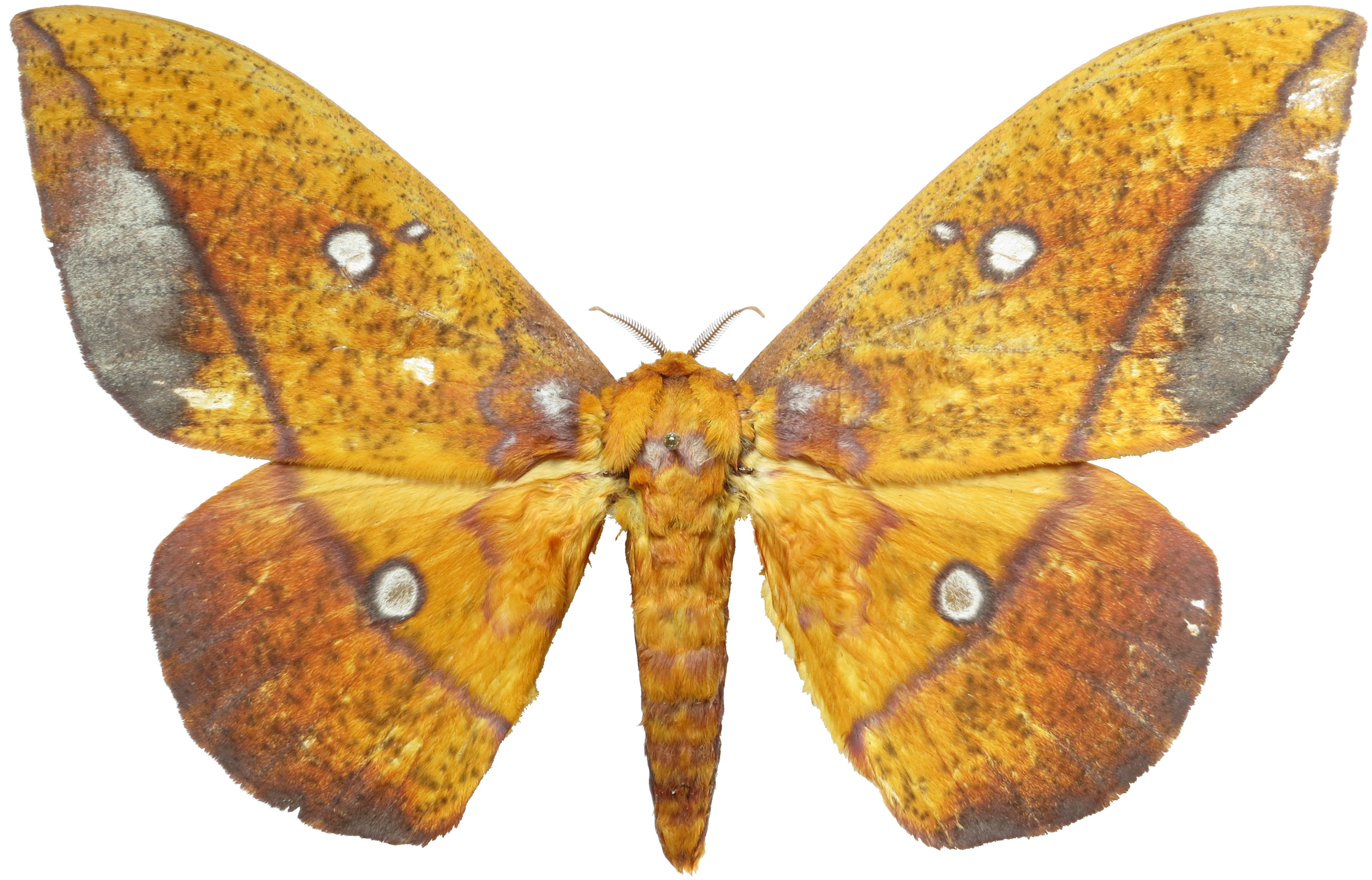
E. penelope male

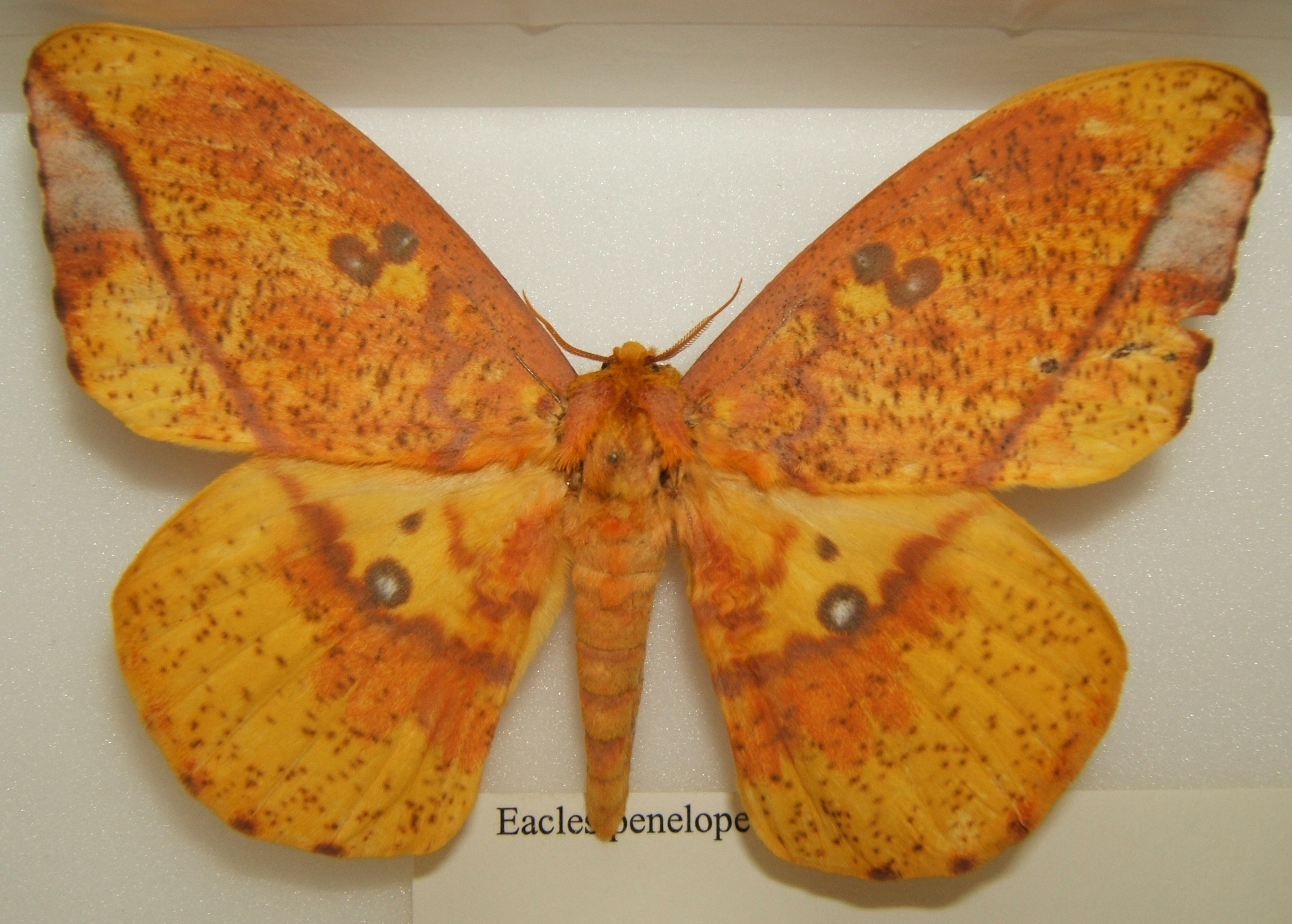
E. penelope female
