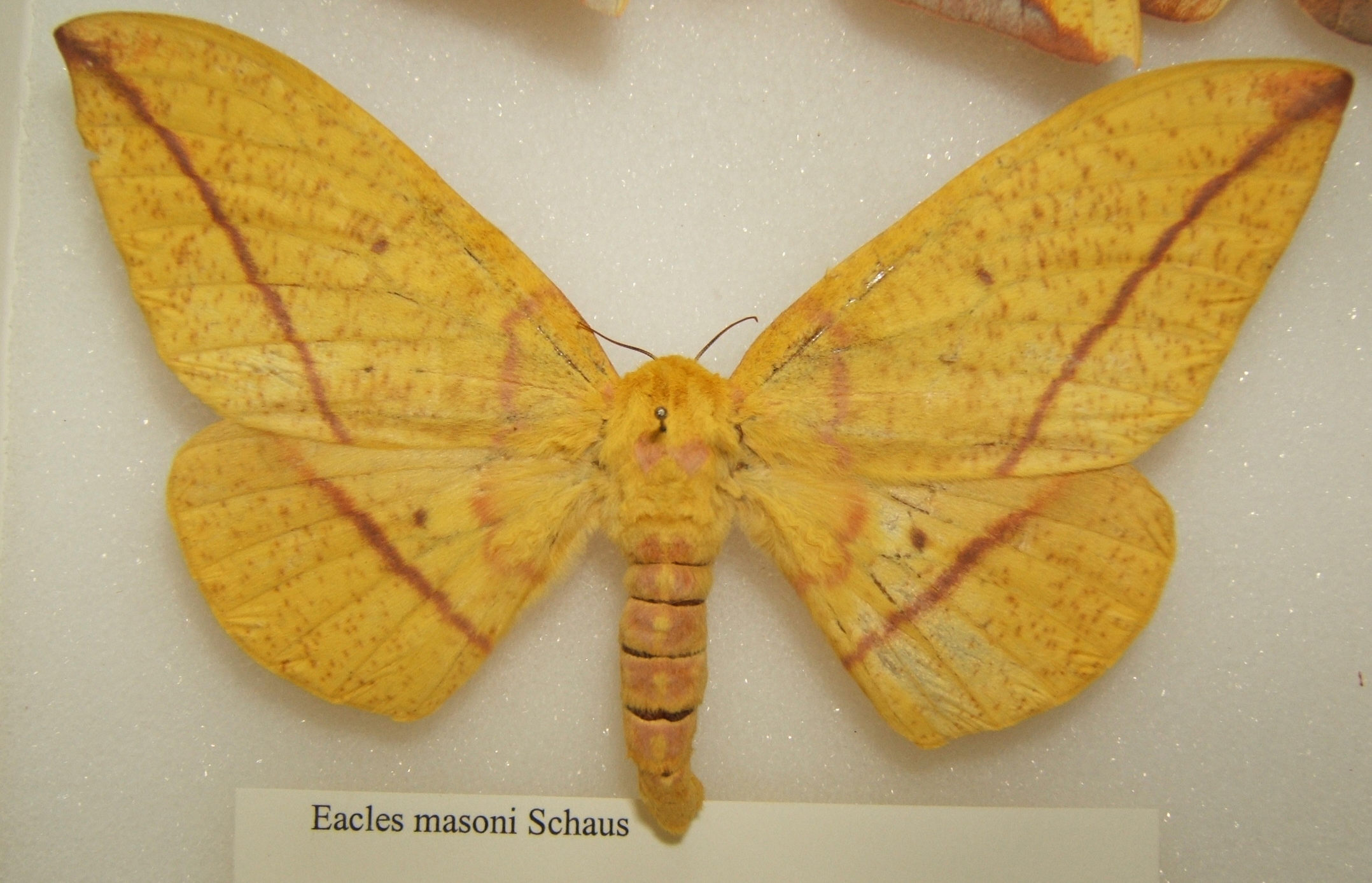
- Eacles masoni female

Scientific classification
- Domain: Eukaryota
- Kingdom: Animalia
- Phylum: Arthropoda
- Class: Insecta
- Order: Lepidoptera
- Family: Saturniidae
- Genus: Eacles
- Species: E. masoni

Binomial name
- Eacles masoni Schaus, 1896

= Eacles masoni =

Species of moth

Eacles masoni is a moth of the family Saturniidae. It is found from Mexico, south to Ecuador and Colombia.

== Subspecies ==
- Eacles masoni masoni
- Eacles masoni tyrannus
- Eacles masoni fulvaster
