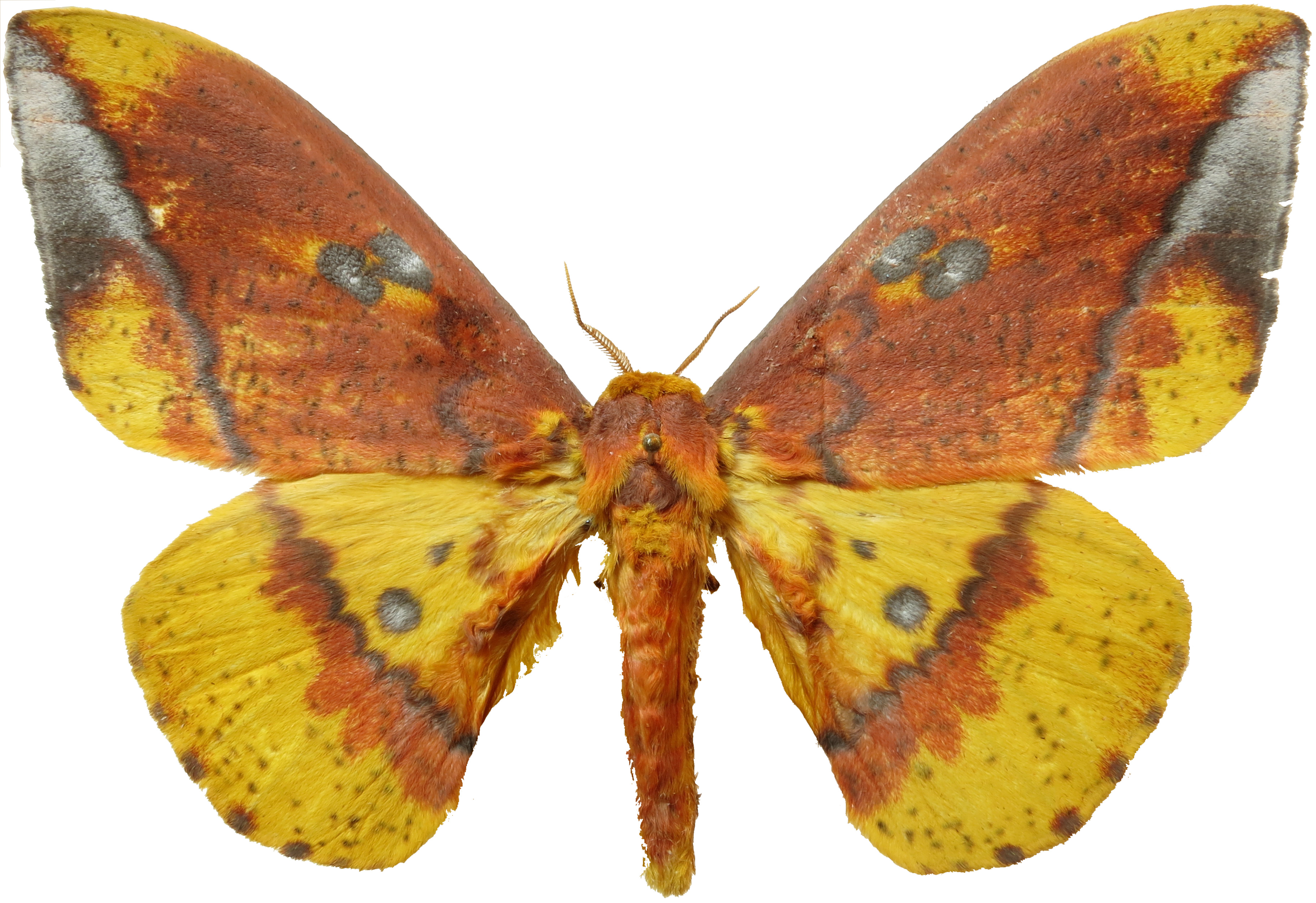

Scientific classification
- Domain: Eukaryota
- Kingdom: Animalia
- Phylum: Arthropoda
- Class: Insecta
- Order: Lepidoptera
- Family: Saturniidae
- Genus: Eacles
- Species: E. ormondei

Binomial name
- Eacles ormondei Schaus, 1889

= Eacles ormondei =

Species of moth

Eacles ormondei is a moth of the family Saturniidae. It is found in tropical America.

== Subspecies ==
- Eacles ormondei ormondei (Mexico)
- Eacles ormondei janzeni Brechlin & Meister, 2011 (Nicaragua)
- Eacles ormondei niepelti Draudt, 1930 (Ecuador)
- Eacles ormondei peruviana Bouvier, 1927 (Ecuador)
- Eacles ormondei vanschaycki Brechlin & Meister, 2011 (Costa Rica)
- Eacles ormondei violacea Lemaire, 1975 (Ecuador)
- Eacles ormondei yucatanensis Lemaire, 1988 (Mexico)
