= Eacles camposportoi =

Scientific classification
- Domain: Eukaryota
- Kingdom: Animalia
- Phylum: Arthropoda
- Class: Insecta
- Order: Lepidoptera
- Family: Saturniidae
- Genus: Eacles
- Species: E. camposportoi

Binomial name
- Eacles camposportoi Mendes, 1937

Species of moth

Eacles camposportoi is a moth in the family Saturniidae. It is found in Brazil.
