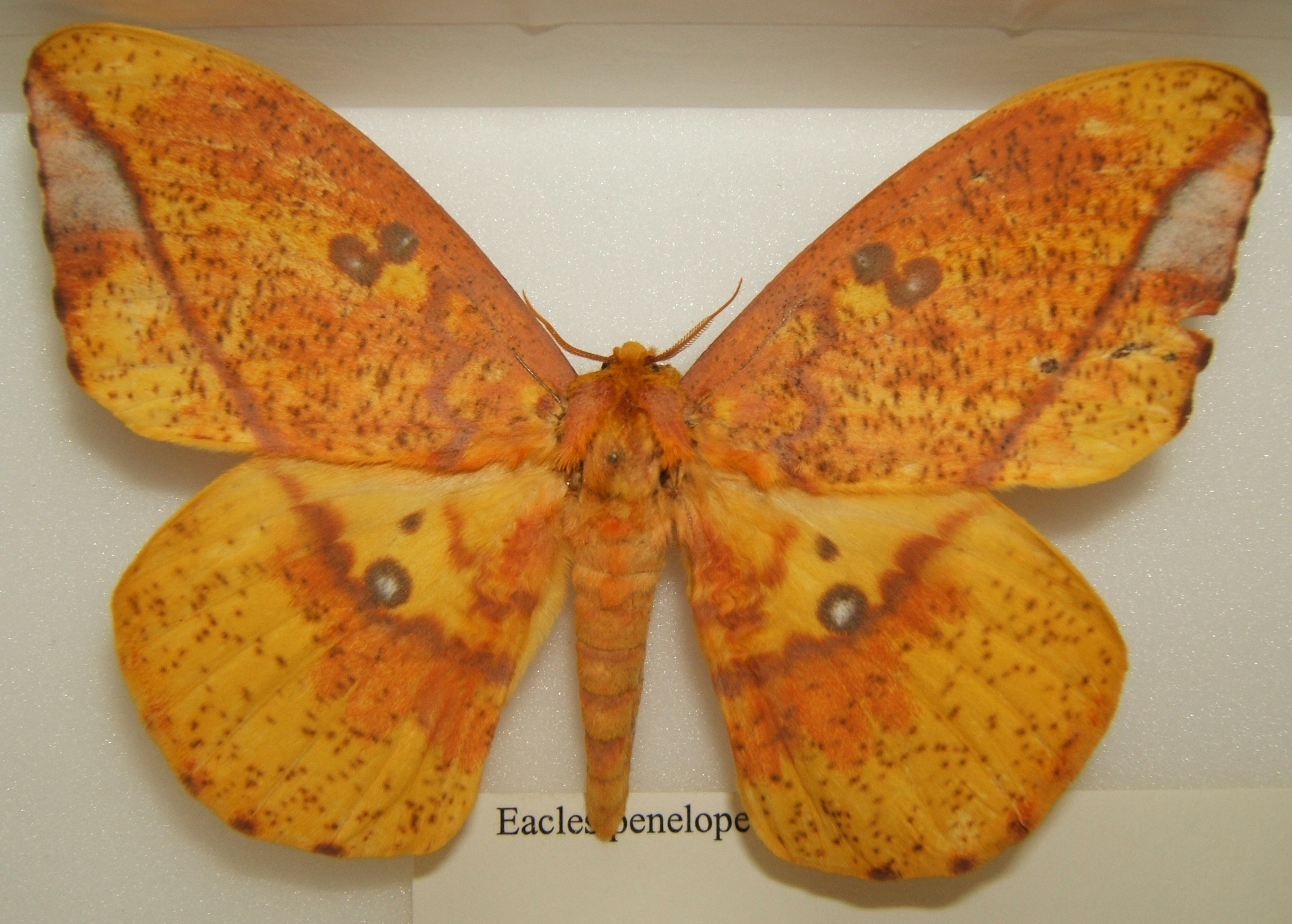
- Eacles penelope female
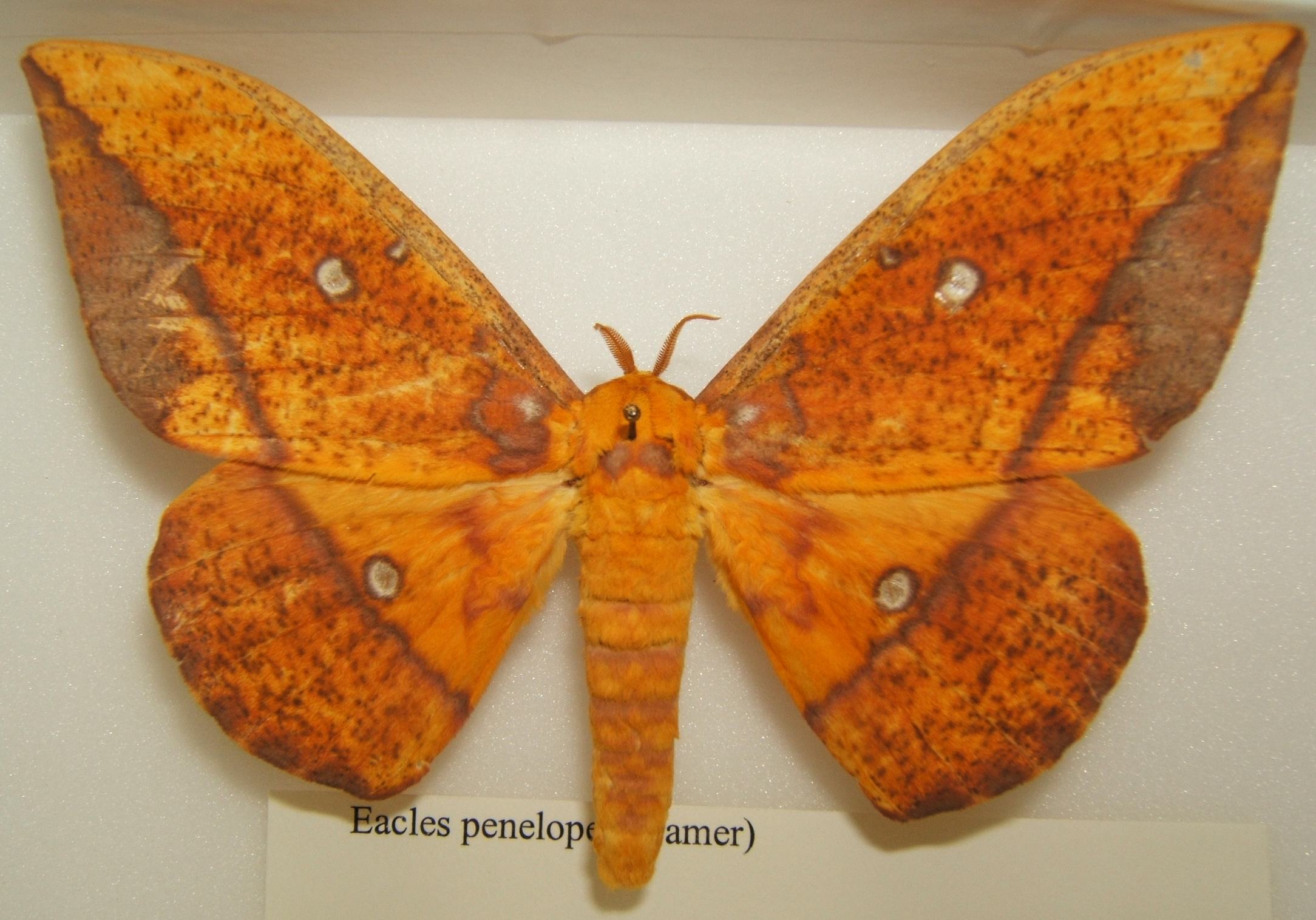
- Eacles penelope male

Scientific classification
- Domain: Eukaryota
- Kingdom: Animalia
- Phylum: Arthropoda
- Class: Insecta
- Order: Lepidoptera
- Family: Saturniidae
- Genus: Eacles
- Species: E. penelope

Binomial name
- Eacles penelope (Cramer, 1775)

= Eacles penelope =

Species of moth

Eacles penelope is a moth of the family Saturniidae. It is found in South America, including Ecuador.

The wingspan reaches 185 mm.

The larvae feed on oak.
