= Eacles kaechi =

Scientific classification
- Kingdom: Animalia
- Phylum: Arthropoda
- Class: Insecta
- Order: Lepidoptera
- Family: Saturniidae
- Genus: Eacles
- Species: E. kaechi

Binomial name
- Eacles kaechi Brechlin & Meister, 2011

Species of moth

Eacles kaechi is a moth in the family Saturniidae. It is found in Ecuador.
