= Eacles manuelita =

Scientific classification
- Kingdom: Animalia
- Phylum: Arthropoda
- Class: Insecta
- Order: Lepidoptera
- Family: Saturniidae
- Genus: Eacles
- Species: E. manuelita

Binomial name
- Eacles manuelita Oiticica, 1941

Species of moth

Eacles manuelita is a moth in the family Saturniidae. It is found in Brazil.

== Distribution ==
Eacles manuelita is endemic to Brazil, where it inhabits tropical and subtropical forest regions. The species has been recorded in multiple states across the country, such as Alagoas, Bahia, Ceará, Minas Gerais, Pernambuco, and Sergipe.
