= Eacles paraadoxa =

Scientific classification
- Kingdom: Animalia
- Phylum: Arthropoda
- Class: Insecta
- Order: Lepidoptera
- Family: Saturniidae
- Genus: Eacles
- Species: E. paraadoxa

Binomial name
- Eacles paraadoxa Brechlin & Meister, 2009

Species of moth

Eacles paraadoxa is a moth in the family Saturniidae. It is found in Peru.
