= Eacles canaima =

Scientific classification
- Domain: Eukaryota
- Kingdom: Animalia
- Phylum: Arthropoda
- Class: Insecta
- Order: Lepidoptera
- Family: Saturniidae
- Genus: Eacles
- Species: E. canaima

Binomial name
- Eacles canaima Feige, 1971

Species of moth

Eacles canaima is a moth in the family Saturniidae. It is found in Venezuela. It is light yellow with some slight orange.
