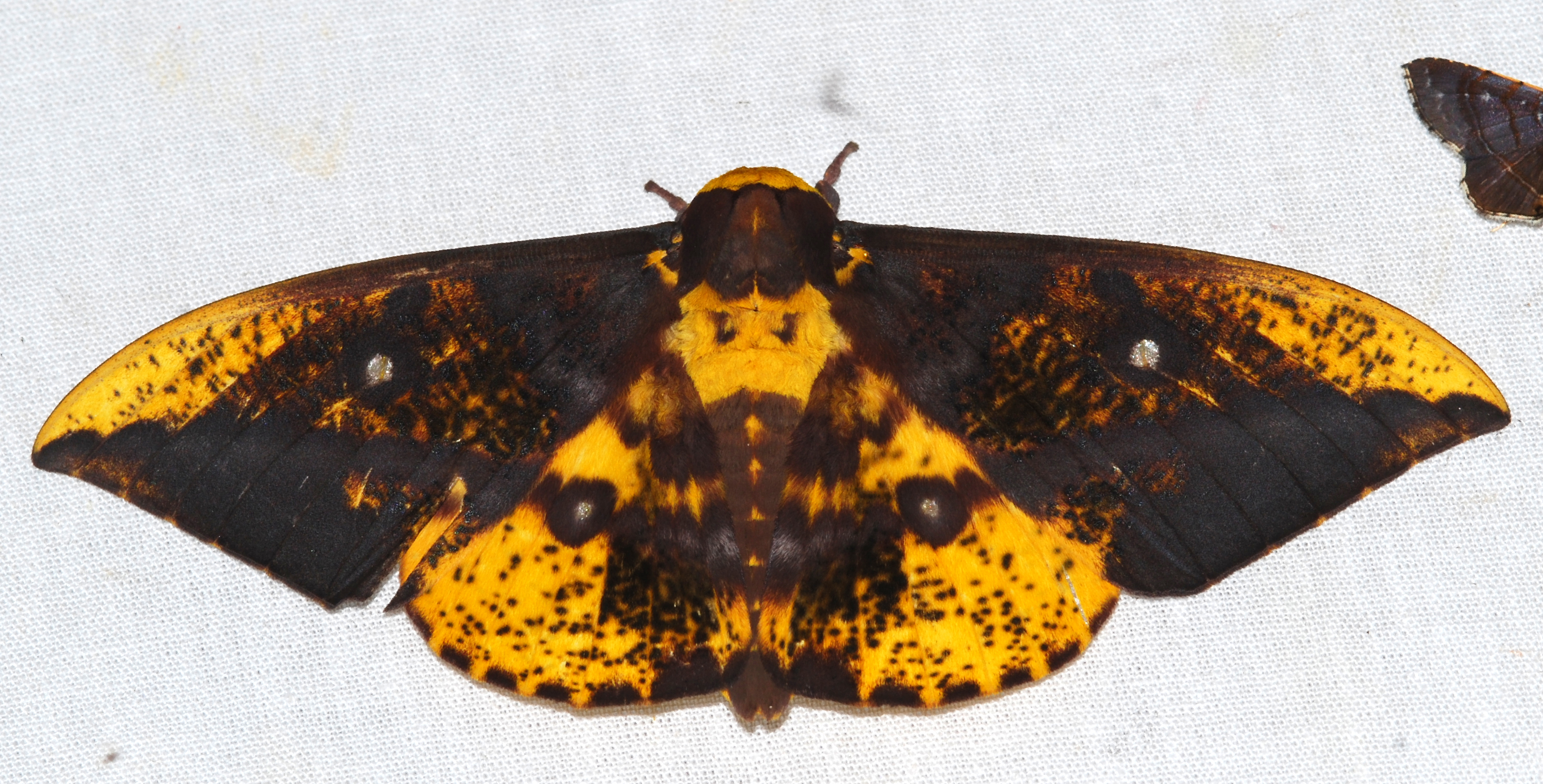

Scientific classification
- Domain: Eukaryota
- Kingdom: Animalia
- Phylum: Arthropoda
- Class: Insecta
- Order: Lepidoptera
- Family: Saturniidae
- Genus: Eacles
- Species: E. guianensis

Binomial name
- Eacles guianensis Schaus, 1905

= Eacles guianensis =

Species of moth

Eacles guianensis is a moth in the family Saturniidae. It is found in Suriname, Venezuela, Guiana, French Guiana, Ecuador, and Brazil.
