= Mayi (surname) =

Mayi is a surname. Notable people with the surname include:

- Kévin Mayi (born 1993), French football player
- Wuta Mayi (born 1949), Congolese recording artist, composer, and vocalist
