= Mayi Bas =

Mayi Bas مي بس
- Village
- Location within Iran
- Coordinates: 30°40′13″N 50°04′22″E
- Country: Iran
- Province: Khuzestan
- County: Behbahan
- Bakhsh: Central
- Rural District: Dodangeh

Population (2006)
  - Total: 63
- Time zone: UTC+3:30 (IRST)
  - Summer (DST): UTC+4:30 (IRDT)

Mayi Bas (Persian: مي بس, also Romanized as Mayī Bas; also known as Māhī Bas) is a village in Dodangeh Rural District, in the Central District of Behbahan County, Khuzestan Province, Iran. At the 2006 census, its population was 63, in 11 families.
