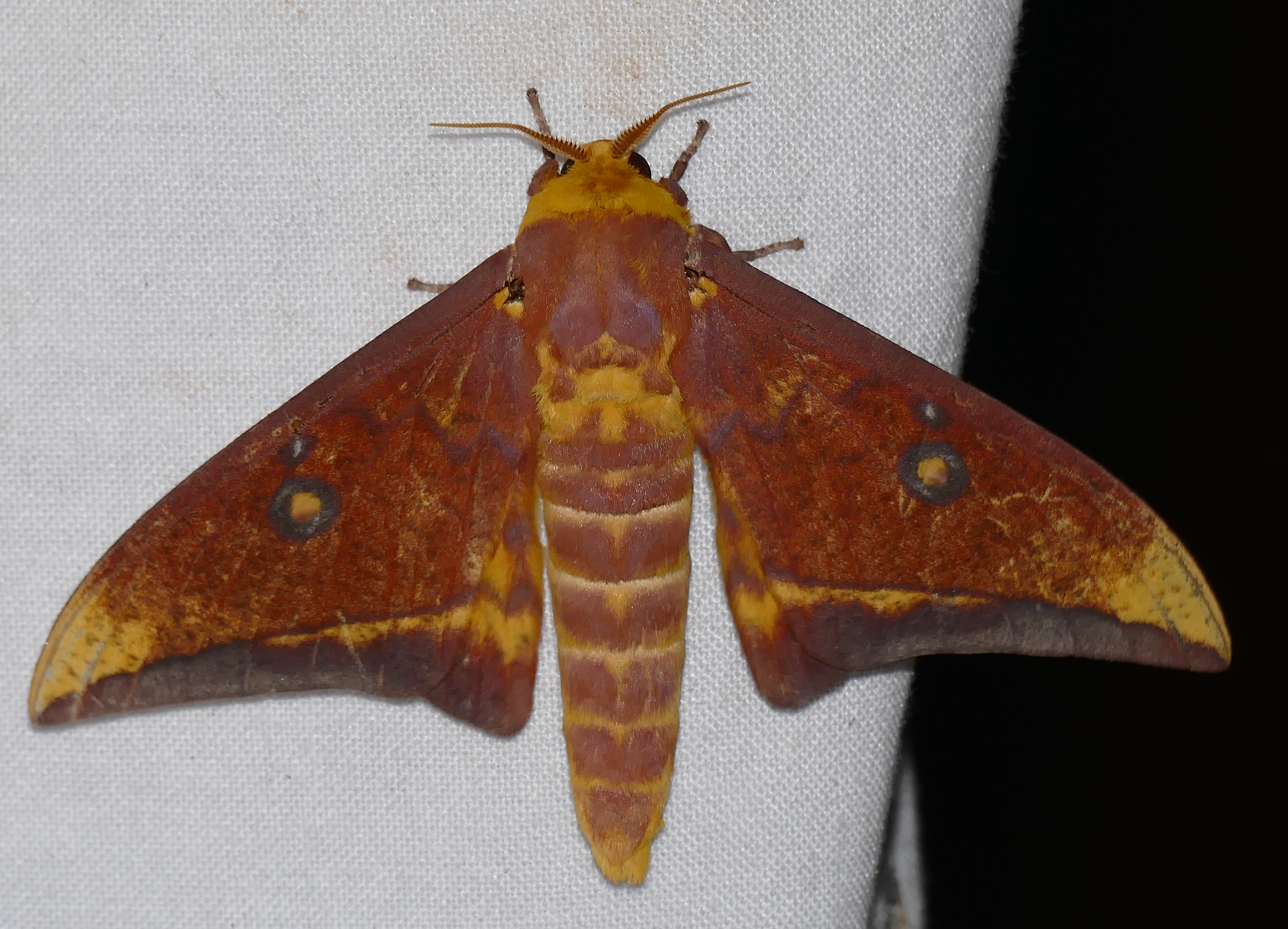
- male

Scientific classification
- Domain: Eukaryota
- Kingdom: Animalia
- Phylum: Arthropoda
- Class: Insecta
- Order: Lepidoptera
- Family: Saturniidae
- Genus: Eacles
- Species: E. acuta

Binomial name
- Eacles acuta Schaus, 1905

= Eacles acuta =

Species of moth

Eacles acuta is a moth of the family Saturniidae. It is found in South America, including French Guiana.

The wings are yellow with large orange patches near the tips and the wingtips are pointed. The body is orange.
