= Buffalo Soldier =

Black American US Army regiments (1866–1951)

Buffalo Soldiers
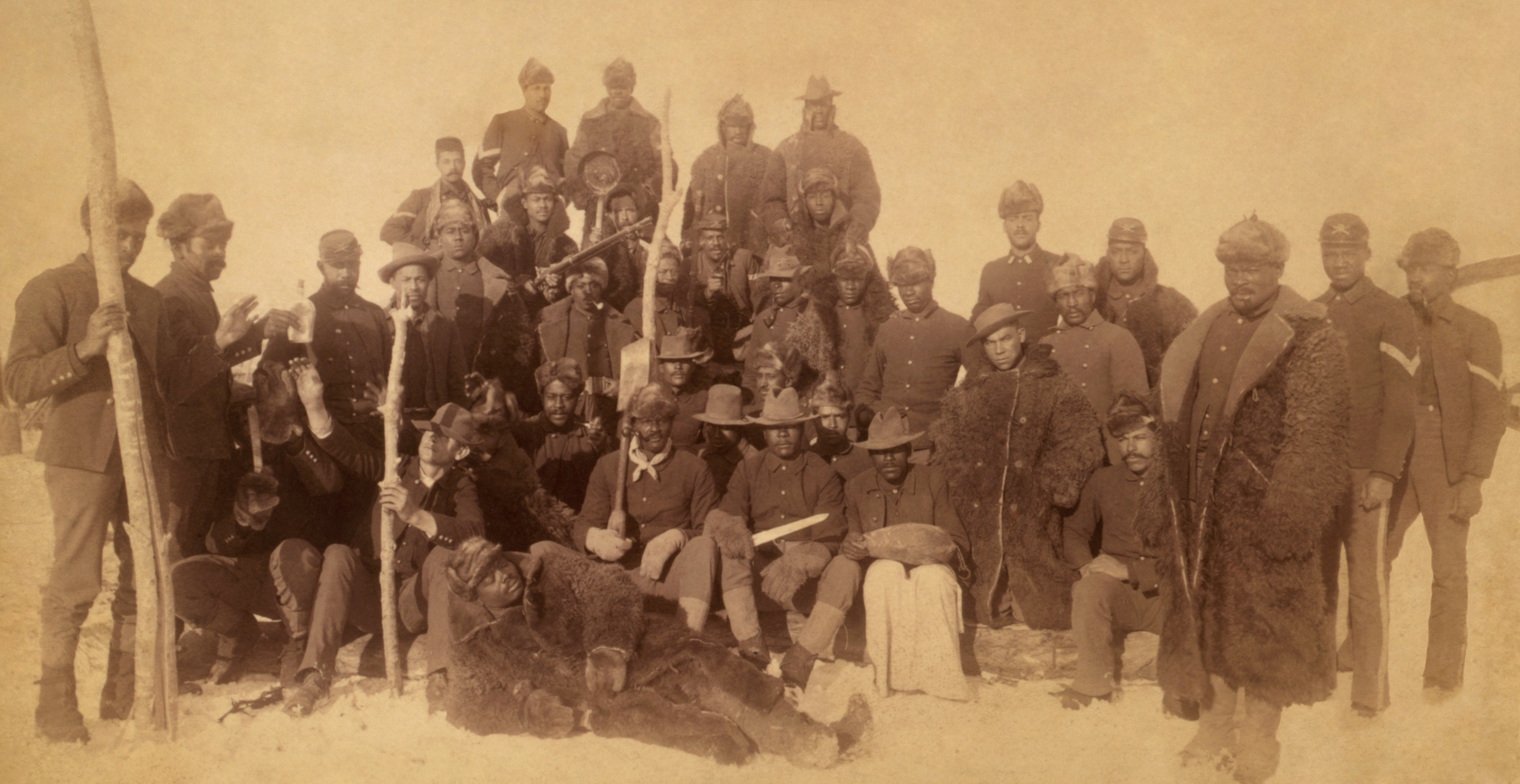
- Buffalo Soldiers of the 25th Infantry Regiment in 1890
- Active: 1866–1951
- Country: United States
- Branch: United States Army: 9th Cavalry Regiment; 10th Cavalry Regiment; 24th Infantry Regiment; 25th Infantry Regiment
- Nickname: "Buffalo Soldiers"
- Colors: Blue
- Engagements: American Indian Wars; Range Wars; Spanish–American War; Philippine–American War; Mexican Border War; World War I; World War II

Buffalo Soldiers were United States Army regiments composed exclusively of Black American soldiers, formed during the 19th century to serve on the American frontier. On September 21, 1866, the 10th Cavalry Regiment was formed at Fort Leavenworth, Kansas. During the exodus of the 1870s, more than 20,000 African Americans migrated to Kansas. They hoped their journey would take them far away from the poverty of the South. Others escaped by being soldiers. They served in the segregated army units and fought in the Western Indian Wars from 1867 to 1896. According to legend, the men were called "buffalo soldiers" by the Apache and Cheyenne. The soldiers adopted the name as a sign of honor and respect. Units of Buffalo Soldiers answered the nation's call to arms mainly in the West, however, also in Cuba, Hawaii, Mexico, and the Philippines. They had a huge impact on the Reconstruction era.

Although numerous Black Union Army regiments were raised during the Civil War (referred to collectively as the United States Colored Troops), "Buffalo Soldiers" were established by the U.S Congress as the first all-black Army regiments in peacetime. The regiments were racially segregated, as the U.S. military would not desegregate until 1948. On November 15, 2024, Robert Dixon, the last surviving Buffalo Soldier, died aged 103. The oldest Buffalo Soldier, Mark Matthews, died in 2005 at the age of 111 and was buried at Arlington National Cemetery.

== Etymology ==
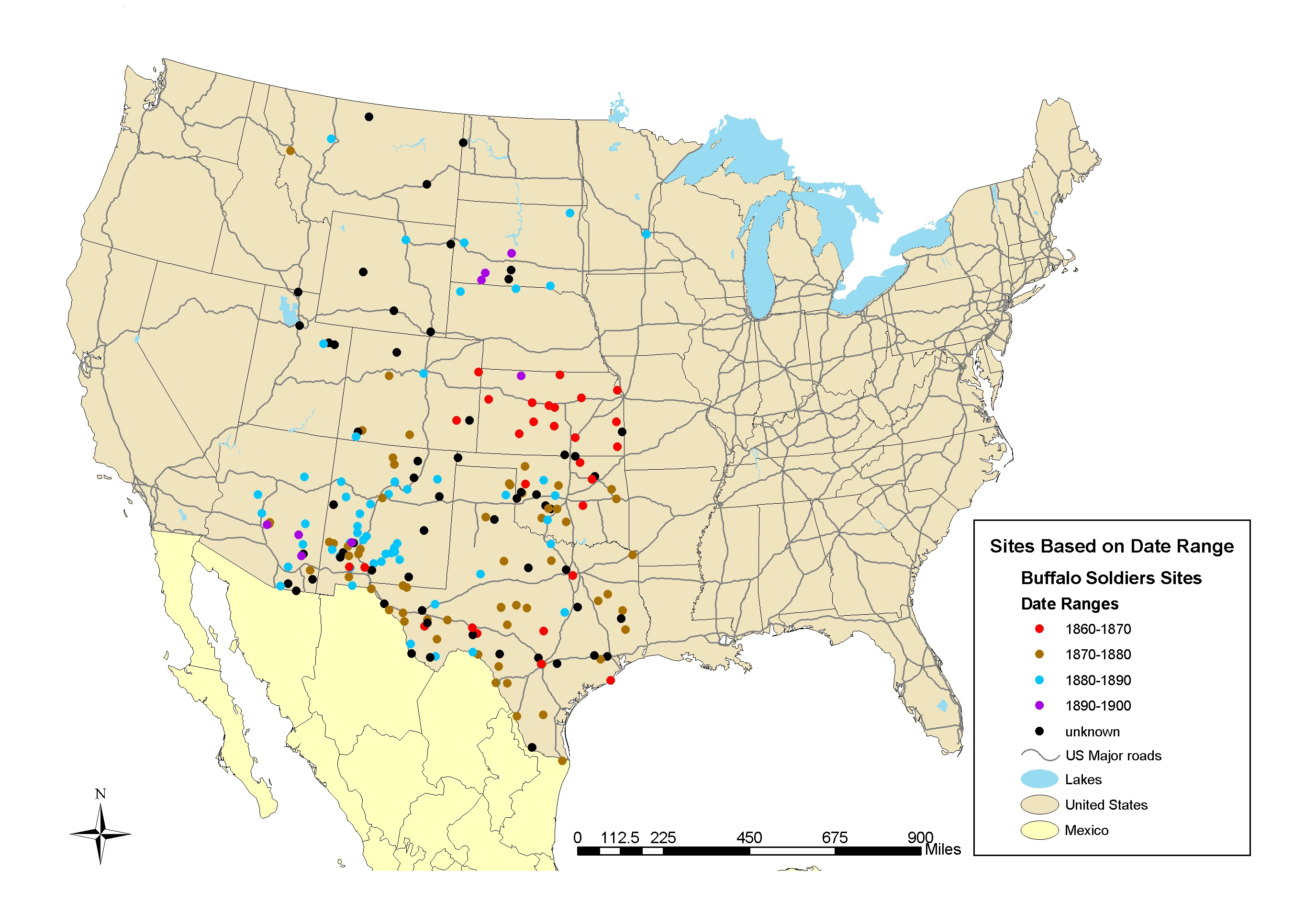
Buffalo Soldier sites from 1860 to 1900

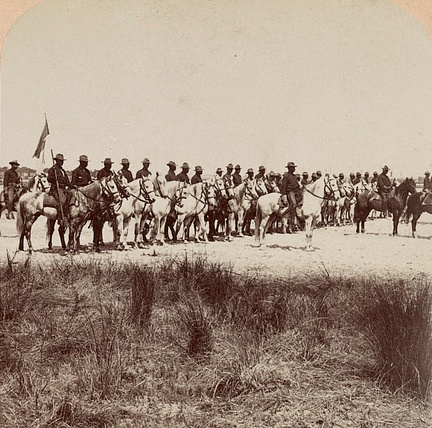
Image taken in 1898 of the 9th U.S. Cavalry.

Sources disagree on how the nickname "Buffalo Soldiers" began. According to the Buffalo Soldiers National Museum the name originated with the Cheyenne warriors in the winter of 1877, the actual Cheyenne translation being "Wild Buffalo". Writer Walter Hill documented the account of Colonel Benjamin Grierson, who founded the 10th Cavalry regiment, recalling an 1871 campaign against Comanches. Hill attributed the origin of the name to the Comanche, due to Grierson's assertions. The Apache used the same term ("We called them 'buffalo soldiers,' because they had curly, kinky hair ... like bison") as supported by other sources. Another possible origin credits the Plains Indians who gave them that name because of the bison coats they wore in winter. The phrase "Buffalo Soldiers" became a generic term for all black soldiers. It is now used for U.S. Army units that trace their direct lineage back to any of the African-American regiments formed in 1866.

== Service ==
During the Civil War, the U.S. government formed regiments known as the United States Colored Troops, composed of black soldiers and Native Americans. The USCT was disbanded in the fall of 1865. In 1867 the Regular Army was set at ten regiments of cavalry and 45 regiments of infantry. The Army was authorized to raise two regiments of Black cavalry (the 9th and 10th (Colored) Cavalry) and four regiments of Black infantry (the 38th, 39th, 40th, and 41st (Colored) Infantry), who were mostly drawn from USCT veterans. The first draft of the bill that the House Committee on Military Affairs sent to the full chamber on March 7, 1866, did not include a provision for regiments of Black cavalry; however, this provision was added by Senator Benjamin Wade prior to the bill's passing on July 28, 1866. In 1869 the Regular Army was kept at ten regiments of cavalry but cut to 25 regiments of Infantry, reducing the Black complement to two regiments (the 24th and 25th (Colored) Infantry). The 38th and 41st were reorganized as the 25th, with headquarters in Jackson Barracks in New Orleans, Louisiana, in November 1869. The 39th and 40th were reorganized as the 24th, with headquarters at Fort Clark, Texas, in April 1869. The two Black infantry regiments represented 10 percent of the size of all twenty-five infantry regiments. Similarly, the two Black cavalry units represented 20 percent of the size of all ten cavalry regiments.

During the peacetime formation years (1865–1870), the Black infantry and cavalry regiments were composed of Black enlisted soldiers commanded by white commissioned officers and Black non-commissioned officers. These included the first commander of the 10th Cavalry Benjamin Grierson, the first commander of the 9th Cavalry Edward Hatch, Medal of Honor recipient Louis H. Carpenter, and Nicholas M. Nolan. The first Black commissioned officer to lead the Buffalo Soldiers and the first Black graduate of West Point, was Henry O. Flipper in 1877.

From 1870 to 1898, the total strength of the US Army totaled 25,000 service members, with Black soldiers maintaining their ten percent representation.

== History ==
=== Indian Wars ===
From 1867 to the early 1890s, these regiments served at a variety of posts in the Southwestern United States and the Great Plains regions. They participated in most of the military campaigns in these areas and earned a distinguished record. Thirteen enlisted men and six officers from these four regiments earned the Medal of Honor during the Indian Wars. In addition to the military campaigns, the Buffalo Soldiers served a variety of roles along the frontier, from building roads to escorting the U.S. mail. On April 17, 1875, regimental headquarters for the 10th Cavalry was transferred to Fort Concho, Texas. Companies actually arrived at Fort Concho in May 1873. The 9th Cavalry was headquartered at Fort Union from 1875 to 1881. At various times from 1873 through 1885, Fort Concho housed 9th Cavalry companies A–F, K, and M, 10th Cavalry companies A, D–G, I, L, and M, 24th Infantry companies D–G, and K, and 25th Infantry companies G and K.

From 1879 to 1881, portions of all four of the Buffalo Soldier regiments were in New Mexico pursuing Victorio and Nana and their Apache warriors in Victorio's War. The 9th Cavalry spent the winter of 1890 to 1891 guarding the Pine Ridge Reservation during the events of the Ghost Dance War and the Wounded Knee Massacre. Cavalry regiments were also used to remove Sooners (whites), who were squatting (illegally occupying) native lands in the late 1880s and early 1890s.

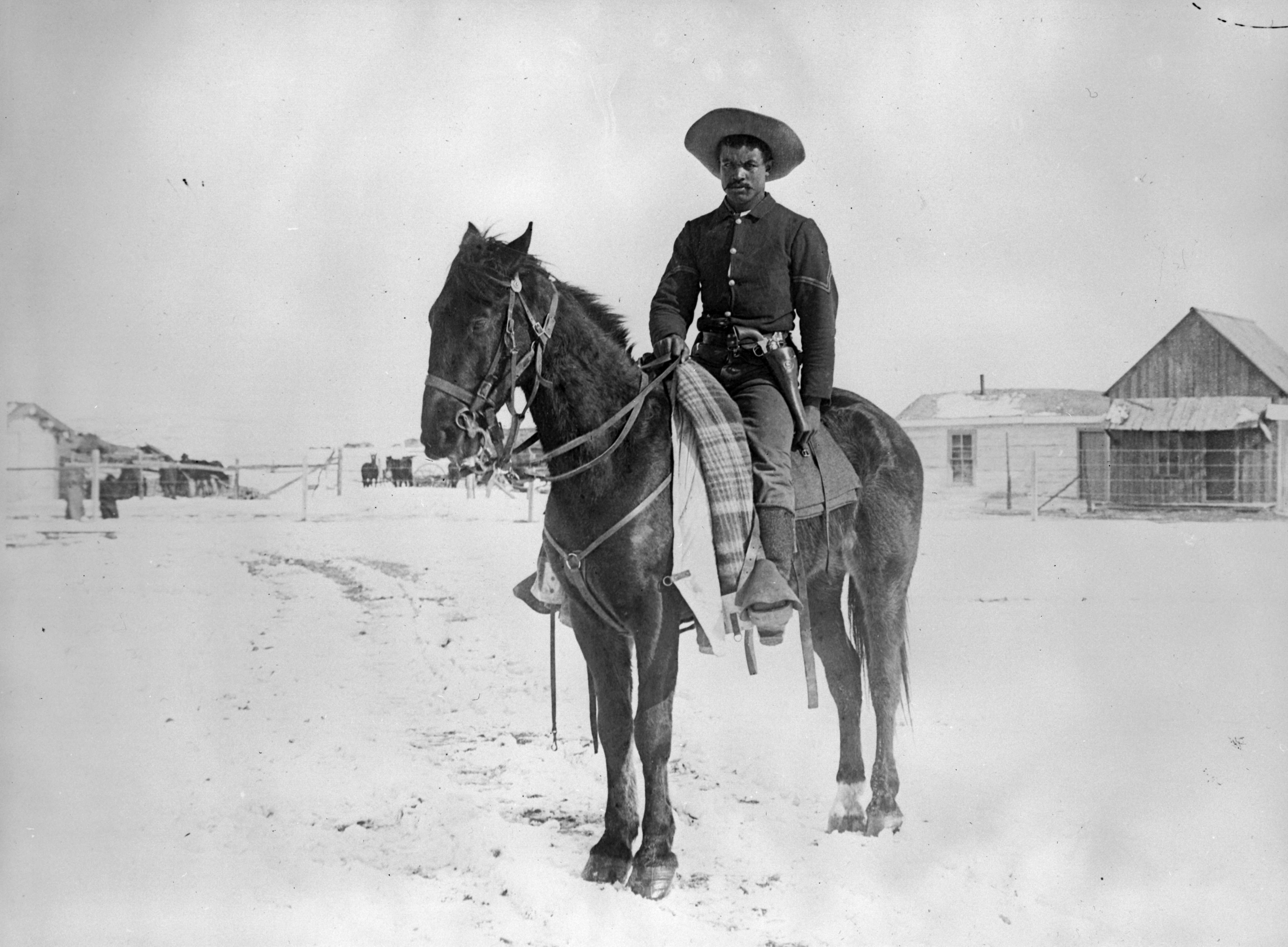
Buffalo Soldier in the 9th Cavalry, 1890

Buffalo Soldiers fought in the last engagement of the Indian Wars, the small Battle of Bear Valley in southern Arizona which occurred in 1918 between U.S. cavalry and Yaqui natives. In total, 23 Buffalo Soldiers received the Medal of Honor during the Indian Wars.

=== Range Wars ===
The Buffalo Soldiers, specifically the 9th Cavalry, participated in two of the largest range conflicts in the American Old West. Range wars were battles fought between large cattle ranchers against smaller ranchers and farmers who competed for land, water, and livestock in the open range. Many of these conflicts resulted in military intervention to pacify and maintain peace. A lesser known action was the 9th Cavalry's participation in the Colfax County War in Colfax County, New Mexico in 1873. Buffalo Soldiers were among the units sent, and on one occasion, some of them had a shootout with a group of Texas cowboys in the St. James Hotel. Three soldiers died during the shootout and a few months later one of the cowboys, Davy Crockett, who was involved, was killed by the local sheriffs. Notorious gunfighter, Clay Allison, shot and killed a Black sergeant in a bar where he was drinking.

The 9th cavalry had a much larger participation in the fabled Johnson County War in Johnson County, Wyoming. It culminated in a lengthy shootout between local farmers, a band of hired killers, and a sheriff's posse. The 6th Cavalry was ordered in by President Benjamin Harrison to quell the violence and capture the band of hired killers. Soon afterward, however, the 9th Cavalry was specifically called on to replace the 6th. The 6th Cavalry was swaying under the local political and social pressures and was unable to keep the peace in the tense environment. The Buffalo Soldiers responded within about two weeks from Nebraska, and moved the men to the rail town of Suggs, Wyoming, creating "Camp Bettens" despite a hostile local population. One soldier was killed and two wounded in a gun battle with locals. Nevertheless, the 9th Cavalry remained in Wyoming for nearly a year to quell tensions in the area.

=== 1898–1918 ===
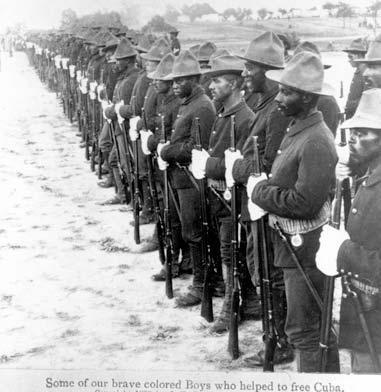
Buffalo Soldiers who participated in the Spanish–American War

After most of the Indian Wars ended in the 1890s, the regiments continued to serve and participated in the 1898 Spanish–American War (including the Battle of San Juan Hill) in Cuba, where five more Medals of Honor were earned.

The men of the Buffalo Soldiers were the only African Americans that fought in Cuba during the war. Additionally, the 6th Massachusetts Volunteer Infantry Regiment had a company of African-American soldiers, company L, that saw action in Puerto Rico. Up to 5,000 "Black men" enlisted in volunteer regiments in the Spanish–American War in Alabama, Illinois, Kansas, North Carolina, Ohio and Virginia, and some had all black officers. Several other African-American regiments of United States Volunteer Infantry (USVI) were formed and nicknamed "Immune Regiments", due to having more natural resistance to malaria, yellow fever & other tropical diseases, but only the 9th Immunes served overseas in the war.

The Buffalo Soldier regiments also took part in the Philippine–American War from 1899 to 1903 and the 1916 Mexican Expedition. There was strong opposition to war in the Philippines among African Americans. Many black soldiers established a rapport with "the brown-skinned natives on the islands," and an unusually large number of black troops deserted during the campaign, some of whom joined the Filipino rebels, of whom the most famous was the celebrated David Fagen.

In 1918, the 10th Cavalry fought at the Battle of Ambos Nogales during the First World War, where they assisted in forcing the surrender of the federal Mexican and Mexican militia forces. In 1917, after being stationed in Houston, Texas, members of the 24th Infantry Regiment participated in the Houston riot of 1917 in which soldiers mutinied and marched on the city of Houston, killing over a dozen whites.

== Park Rangers ==
Another little-known contribution of the Buffalo Soldiers involved eight troops of the 9th Cavalry Regiment and one company of the 24th Infantry Regiment who served in California's Sierra Nevada as some of the first national park rangers. In 1899, Buffalo Soldiers from Company H, 24th Infantry Regiment briefly served in Yosemite National Park, Sequoia National Park, and General Grant (Kings Canyon) National Parks.

U.S. Army regiments had been serving in these national parks since 1891, but until 1899, the soldiers serving were white. Beginning in 1899, and continuing in 1903 and 1904, African American regiments served during the summer in the second and third oldest national parks in the United States (Sequoia and Yosemite). Because these soldiers served before the National Park Service was created in 1916, they were "park rangers" before the term was coined.

A lasting legacy of the soldiers as park rangers is the campaign hat they wore (popularly known as the Smokey Bear hat). Although not officially adopted by the Army until 1911, the distinctive hat crease, called a Montana peak, (or pinch) can be seen being worn by several of the Buffalo Soldiers in park photographs dating back to 1899. Soldiers serving in the Spanish–American War began to re-crease the Stetson hat with a Montana "pinch" to better shed water from the torrential tropical rains. Many retained that distinctive crease upon their return to the U.S. The park photographs, in all likelihood, show Buffalo Soldiers who were veterans from that war.

One particular Buffalo Soldier stands out in history: Captain Charles Young, who served with Troop I, 9th Cavalry Regiment in Sequoia National Park during the summer of 1903. Young was the third African American to graduate from the United States Military Academy. At the time of his death, he was the highest-ranking African American in the U.S. military. He made history in Sequoia National Park in 1903 by becoming Acting Military Superintendent of Sequoia and General Grant National Parks. Young was also the first African American superintendent of a national park. During Young's tenure in the park, he named a giant sequoia for Booker T. Washington. Recently, another giant sequoia in Giant Forest was named in Captain Young's honor. Some of Young's descendants attended the ceremony.

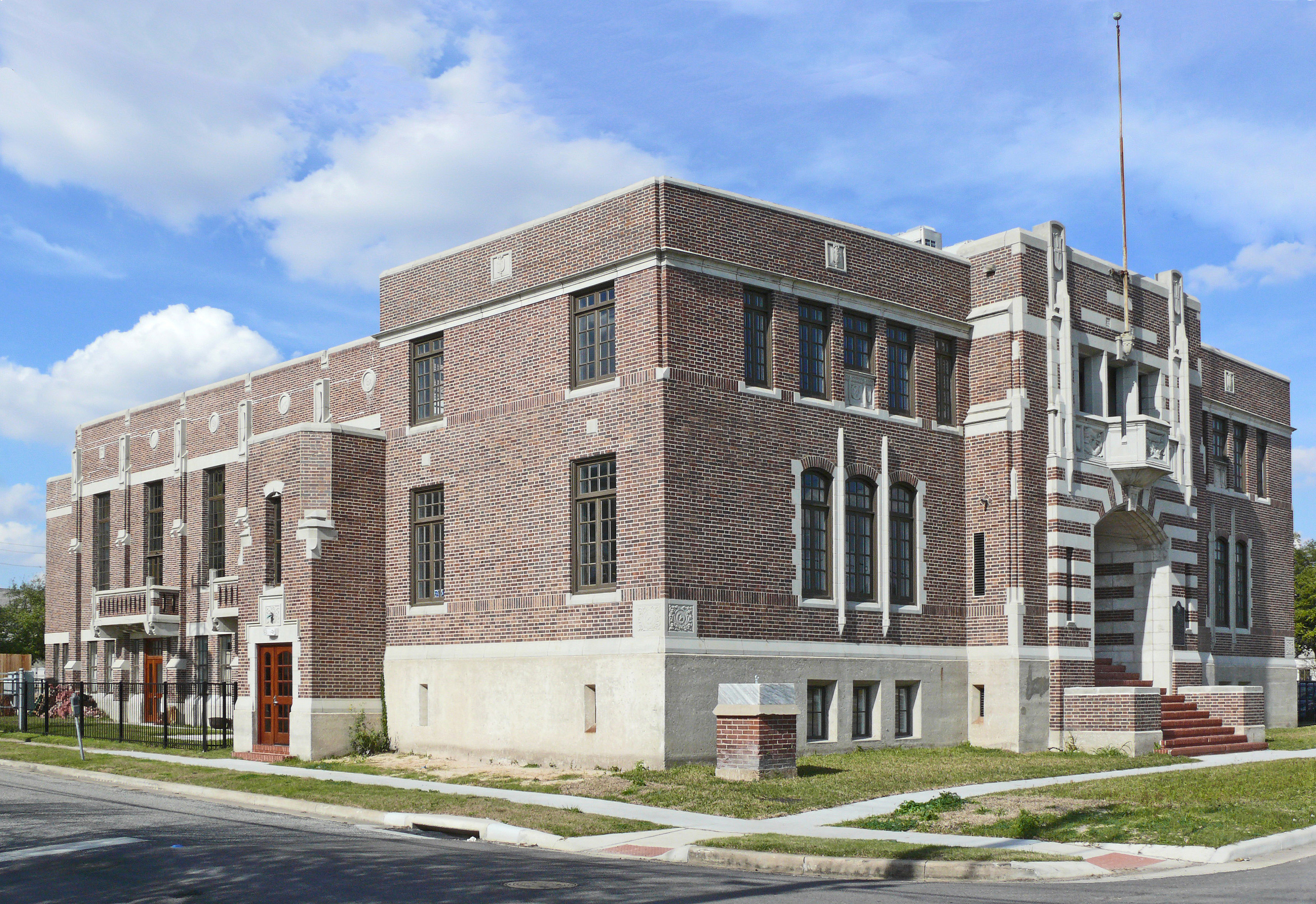
Buffalo Soldiers National Museum in Houston

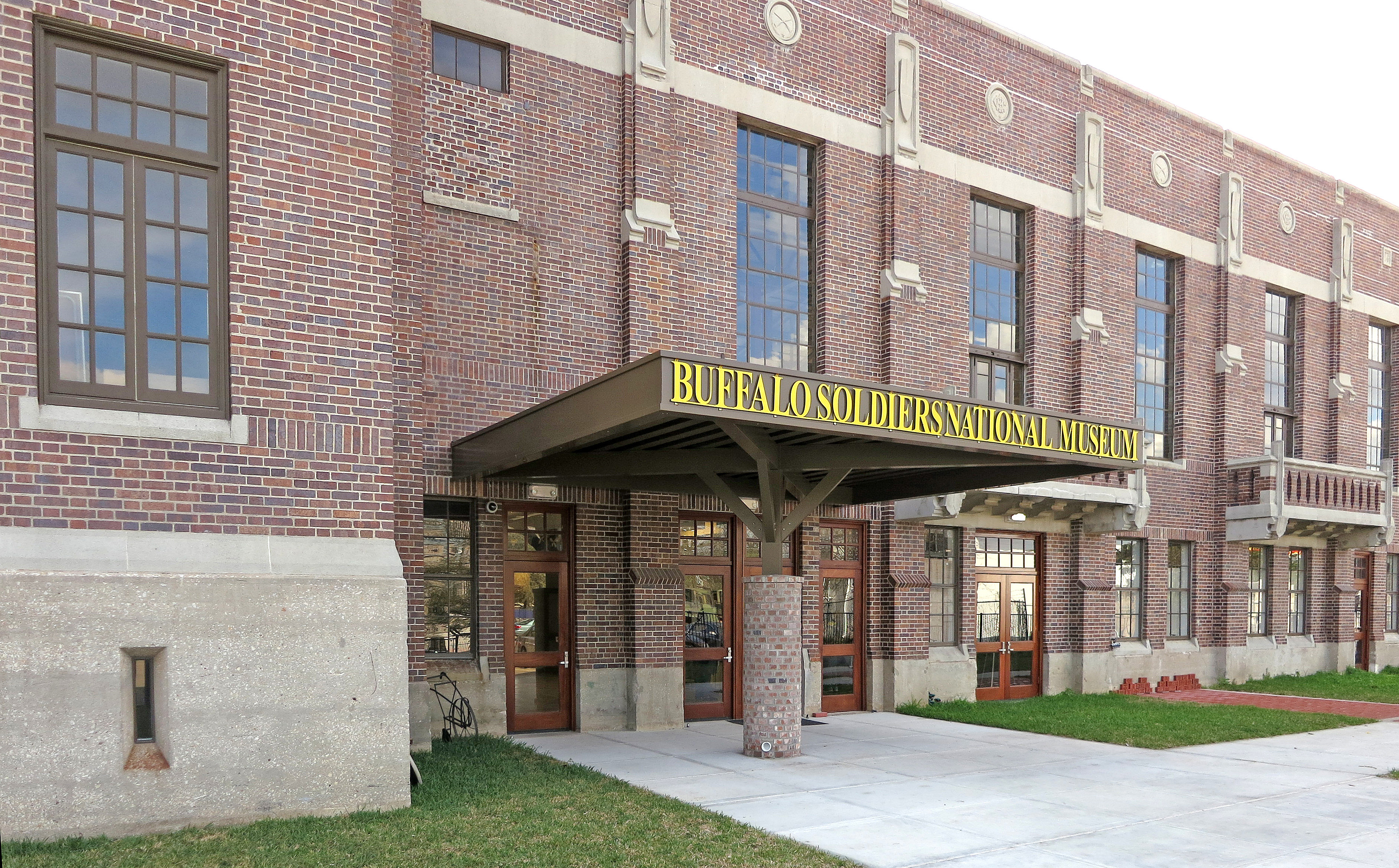
Entrance to Buffalo Soldiers National Museum

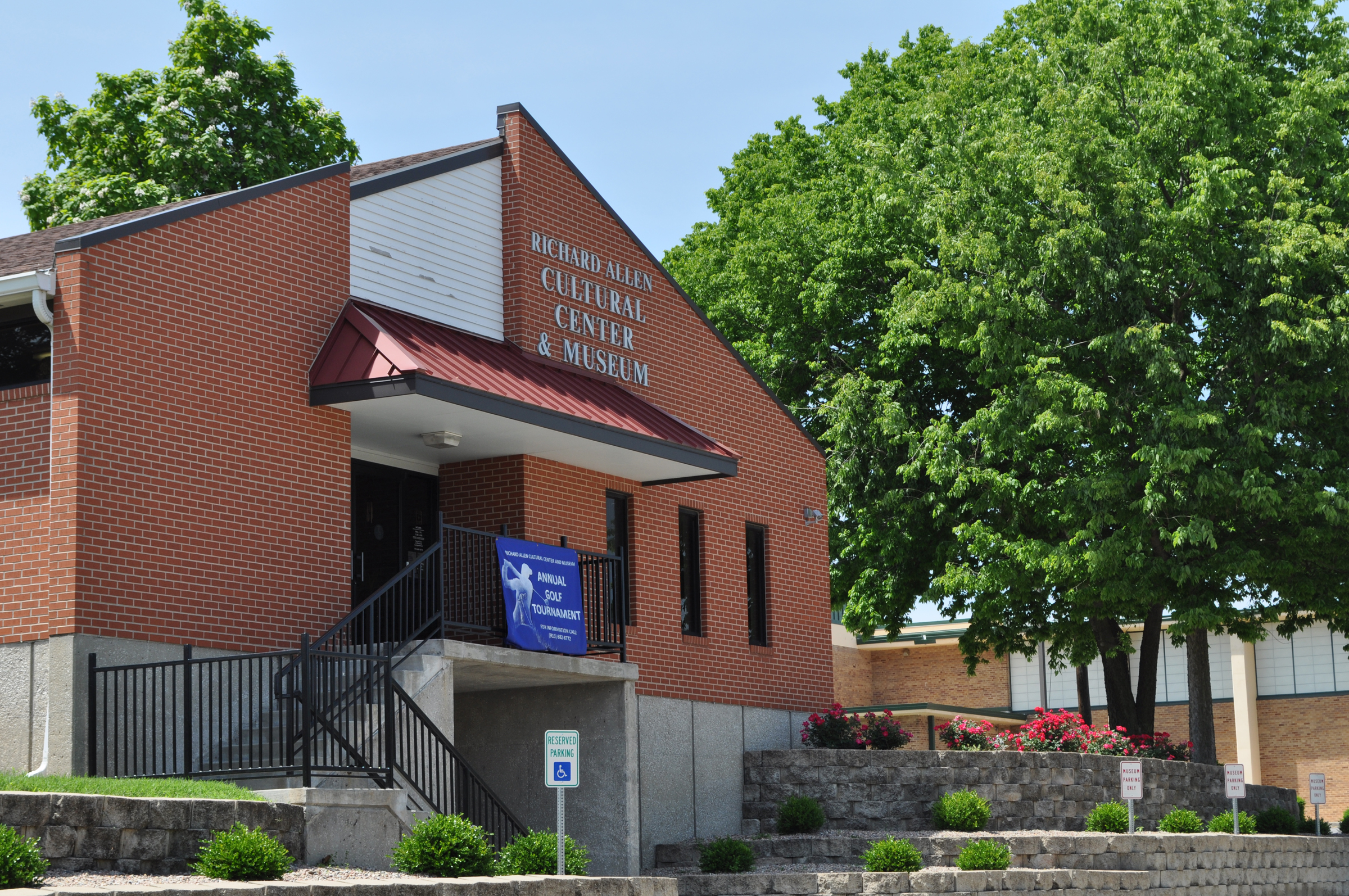
The Richard Allen Cultural Center in Leavenworth, Kansas, includes the home of a former black U.S. Army soldier. The museum shares the histories of African Americans living on the Kansas frontier during pioneer days to the present, especially those serving in the U.S. Army as Buffalo Soldiers.

In 1903, 9th Cavalrymen in Sequoia built the first trail to the top of Mount Whitney, the highest mountain in the contiguous United States. They also built the first wagon road into Sequoia's Giant Forest, the most famous grove of giant sequoia trees in Sequoia National Park.

In 1904, 9th Cavalrymen in Yosemite built an arboretum on the South Fork of the Merced River in the southern section of the park. This arboretum had pathways and benches, and some plants were identified in both English and Latin. Yosemite's arboretum is considered to be the first museum in the National Park System. The NPS cites a 1904 report, where Yosemite superintendent (Lt. Col.) John Bigelow, Jr. declared the arboretum "To provide a great museum of nature for the general public free of cost ..." Unfortunately, the forces of developers, miners, and greed cut the boundaries of Yosemite in 1905 and the arboretum was nearly destroyed.

In the Sierra Nevada, the Buffalo Soldiers regularly endured long days in the saddle, slim rations, racism, and separation from family and friends. As military stewards, the African American cavalry and infantry regiments protected the national parks from illegal grazing, poaching, timber thieves, and forest fires. Yosemite Park Ranger Shelton Johnson researched and interpreted the history in an attempt to recover and celebrate the contributions of the Buffalo Soldiers of the Sierra Nevada.

== West Point ==

On March 23, 1907, the United States Military Academy Detachment of Cavalry was changed to a colored unit. It had been proposed in 1897 at the "Cavalry and Light Artillery School" at Fort Riley, Kansas that West Point cadets learn their riding skills from the black noncommissioned officers who were considered the best. The 100-man detachment from the 9th, and 10th Cavalry served to teach future officers at West Point riding instruction, mounted drill, and tactics until 1947.

The West Point "Escort of Honour" detachment of the 10th Cavalry was distinguished in 1931 by being the last regular army unit to be issued with the M1902 blue dress uniform for all ranks. This parade uniform had ceased to be worn by other regiments after 1917.

The last commanding officer of the West Point detachment of the Buffalo Soldiers, (9th and 10th Cavalry,) was Lt. Col. John "Duke" Nazzaro. Nazzaro was known and recognized for standing with his detachment on and off the field. He established a college scholarship for descendants of the Buffalo Soldiers in his son, Thomas Nazzaro's name.

== Prejudice ==
The Buffalo Soldiers were often confronted with racial prejudice from other members of the U.S. Army. Civilians in the areas where the soldiers were stationed occasionally reacted to them with violence. Buffalo Soldiers were attacked during racial disturbances in Rio Grande City, Texas, in 1899, Brownsville, Texas, in 1906, and Houston, Texas, in 1917.

During the Spanish–American War, the 9th Cavalry faced violent conflict with white citizens in multiple cities in Florida including Lakeland and Tampa.

During the Indian Wars from 1866 to 1891, 416 soldiers were awarded the Medal of Honor. Although the Buffalo Soldiers were 12% of the U.S. Army infantry force and 20% of the cavalry force in this era, Buffalo Soldiers were awarded less than 4% of all Medals of Honor awarded. Other regiments during the era received a greater number of Medals of Honor but were not distinguished enough to see duty in Cuba for the Spanish–American War. For example, the 8th Cavalry Regiment with 84 Medals of Honor, were not assigned duty to fight in Cuba in 1898. Scholars have hypothesized that commanders were reticent to award behavior that they expected from soldiers, the bureaucracy impeded awards, and the posting of black soldiers to remote outposts reduced the visibility of black soldiers (the 1st Cavalry participated in twenty-one campaigns and the 2nd cavalry participated in nineteen campaigns during this era, compared to the 9th Cavalry's eight campaigns). Historian Thomas Phillips counted 2,704 engagements with native tribes during this era, of which the four black regiments participated in 141 or about 5%.

== Camp Logan mutiny ==
The Camp Logan Mutiny, also known as the Houston riot of 1917, was a mutiny and riot by 156 soldiers from the all-black 24th Infantry Regiment of the United States Army, taking place on August 23, 1917, in Houston, Texas. 118 soldiers were tried in three courts-martial; 110 were convicted, of whom 19 were executed; and 63 sentenced to life imprisonment. The Army announced on November 13, 2023, that the convictions of the 110 soldiers were overturned after a thorough review by the Army Board for Correction of Military Records found that the soldiers were wrongly treated because of their race and not given fair trials.

== John J. Pershing ==
General of the Armies of the United States John Pershing and Col. Harry Cootes, commander of Fort Myer, review the Machine Gun Troop of the 10th Cavalry Regiment upon its posting to Fort Myer in 1931.

General of the Armies John J. Pershing is a controversial figure regarding the Buffalo Soldiers. He served with the 10th Cavalry Regiment from October 1895 to May 1897, starting as a first lieutenant when he took command of a troop of the 10th in October 1895.

In 1897, Pershing became an instructor at West Point, where he joined the tactical staff. West Point cadets upset over Pershing's disciplinary treatment and high standards took to calling him "Nigger Jack", because he had learned to have full respect for black soldiers while leading them. Later during the Spanish–American War, where Pershing served with the 10th for six months in Cuba, the press softened the term to "Black Jack", which they continued to use in World War I.

At the start of the Spanish–American War, First Lieutenant Pershing was offered a brevet rank and commissioned a major of volunteers on August 26, 1898. He fought with the 10th Cavalry (Buffalo Soldiers) on Kettle and San Juan Hills in Cuba and was cited for gallantry.

During World War I, Pershing was the Commander-in-Chief (C-in-C) of the American Expeditionary Force (AEF) on the Western Front. While earlier a champion of the African-American soldier, at this time he did not defend their full participation on the battlefield, but bowed to the racist policies of President Woodrow Wilson, Secretary of War Newton D. Baker, and the Southern Democratic Party with its "separate but equal" philosophy.

Baker was cognizant of the many problems of domestic and allied political involvement in military decision-making during wartime, and gave Pershing unmatched authority to run his command as he saw fit, but Pershing practiced careful realpolitik where black participation was concerned, not engaging in issues that might distract or diminish his command. Even so, Pershing allowed American soldiers (African Americans) to be under the command of a foreign power for the first time in American history.

== The Punitive Expedition, U.S.–Mexico border, and World War I ==
The outbreak of the Mexican Revolution in 1910 against the long-time rule of President Porfirio Díaz initiated a decade-long period of high-intensity military conflict along the U.S.–Mexico border as different political/military factions in Mexico fought for power. The access to arms and customs duties from Mexican communities along the U.S.–Mexico boundary made border towns such as Matamoros, Tamaulipas, Ojinaga, Chihuahua, and Nogales, Sonora, important strategic assets. As the various factions in Mexico vied for power, the U.S. Army, including the Buffalo Soldier units, was dispatched to the border to maintain security. The Buffalo Soldiers played a key role in U.S.–Mexico relations as the maelstrom that followed the ousting of Díaz and the assassination of his successor Francisco Madero intensified.

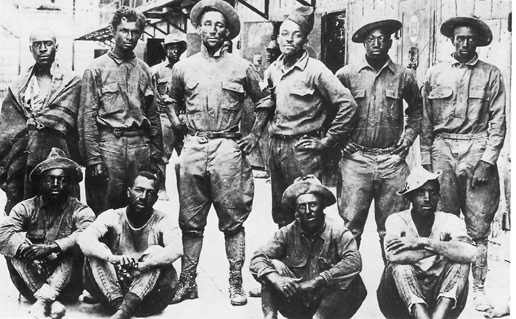
Buffalo Soldiers of the U.S. 10th Cavalry Regiment who were taken prisoner during the Battle of Carrizal, Chihuahua, Mexico in 1916

By late 1915, the political faction led by Venustiano Carranza received diplomatic recognition from the U.S. government as the legitimate ruling force in Mexico. Francisco "Pancho" Villa, who had previously courted U.S. recognition and thus felt betrayed, then attacked the rural community of Columbus, New Mexico, directly leading to further border tensions as U.S. President Woodrow Wilson unilaterally dispatched the Punitive Expedition into Chihuahua, Mexico, under General John Pershing to apprehend or kill Villa. The 9th and 10th regiments were deployed to Mexico along with the rest of Pershing's units. Although the manhunt for Villa failed, small-scale confrontations in the communities of Parral and Carrizal nearly brought about a war between Mexico and the United States in the summer of 1916. Tensions cooled through diplomacy as the captured Buffalo Soldiers from Carrizal were released. Despite the public outrage over Villa's Columbus raid, Wilson and his cabinet felt that the U.S.'s attention ought to be centered on Germany and World War I, not the apprehension of the "Centauro del Norte". The Punitive Expedition exited Mexico in early 1917, just before the U.S. declaration of war against Germany in April 1917.

The Buffalo Soldiers did not participate with the American Expeditionary Forces (AEF) during World War I, but experienced noncommissioned officers were provided to other segregated Black units for combat service—such as the 317th Engineer Battalion. The soldiers of the 92nd and the 93rd infantry divisions were the first Americans to fight in France. The four regiments of the 93rd fought under French command for the duration of the war.

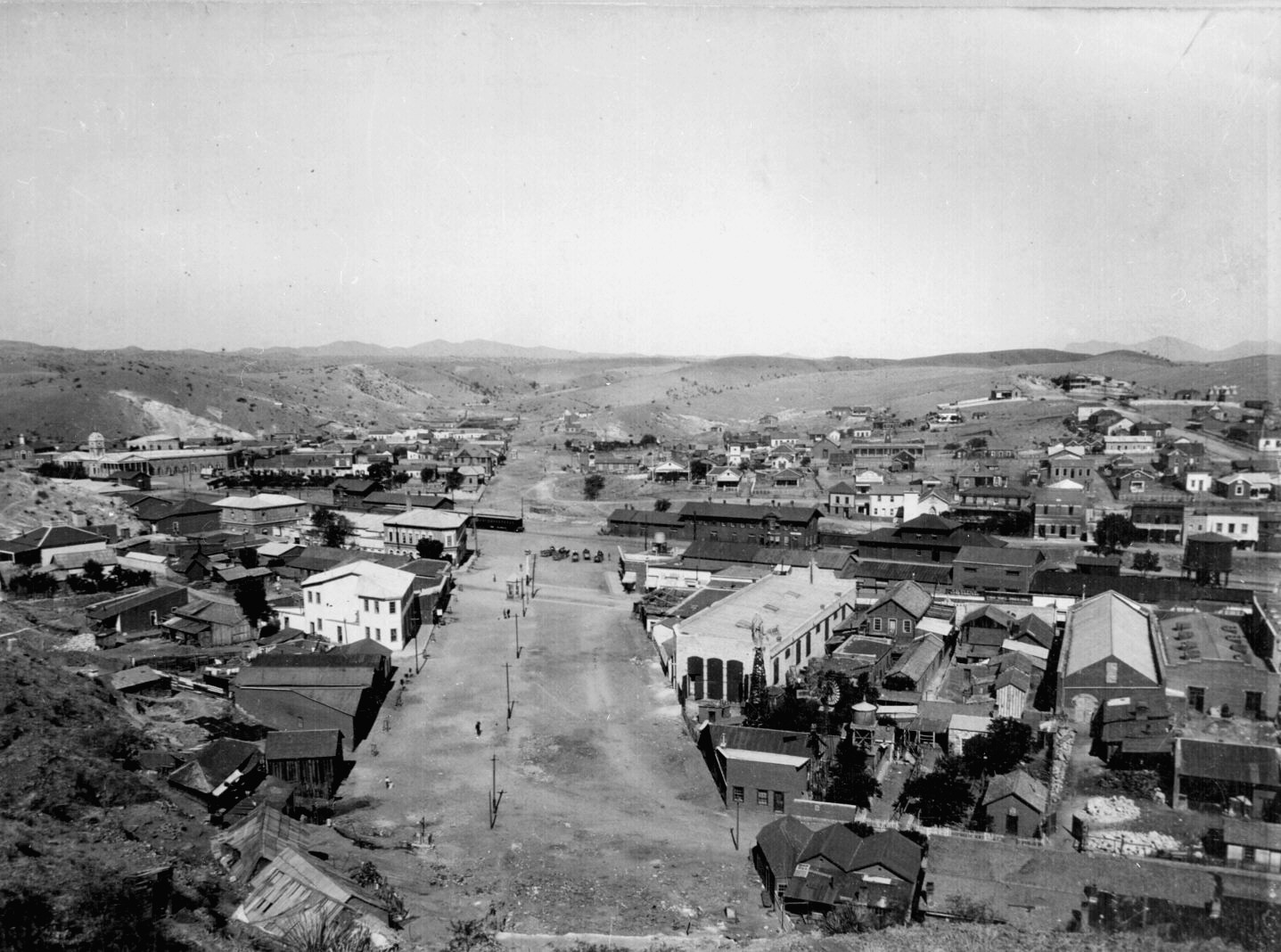
The U.S.-Mexico border in Nogales in 1898: International Street/Calle Internacional runs through the center of the image between Nogales, Sonora (left), and Nogales, Arizona (right). Note the wide-open international boundary. A Customs House is located near the center of the image.

On August 27, 1918, the 10th Cavalry supported the 35th Infantry Regiment in a border skirmish in the border towns of Nogales, Arizona, and Nogales, Sonora, between U.S. military forces, Mexican Federal troops, and armed Mexican civilians (militia) in the Battle of Ambos Nogales. This was the only incident in which German military advisers allegedly fought along with Mexican soldiers against United States soldiers on North America soil during World War I.

=== Battle of Ambos Nogales ===
The 35th Infantry Regiment was stationed at Nogales, Arizona, on August 27, 1918, when at about 4:10 p.m., a gun battle erupted unintentionally when a Mexican civilian attempted to pass through the border, back to Mexico, without being interrogated at the U.S. Customs house. After the initial shooting, reinforcements from both sides rushed to the border. On the Mexican side, the majority of the belligerents were angry civilians upset with the killings of Mexican border crossers by the U.S. Army along the vaguely defined border between the two cities during the previous year (the U.S. Border Patrol did not exist until 1924). For the Americans, the reinforcements were the 10th Cavalry, off-duty 35th Regiment soldiers, and militia. Hostilities quickly escalated, and several soldiers were killed, and others wounded on both sides, including the mayor of Nogales, Sonora, Felix B. Peñaloza (killed when waving a white truce flag/handkerchief with his cane). A cease-fire was arranged later after the US forces took the heights south of Nogales, Arizona.

Due in part to the heightened hysteria caused by World War I, allegations surfaced that German agents fomented this violence and died fighting alongside the Mexican troops they led. U.S. newspaper reports in Nogales before the August 27, 1918, battle documented the departure of part of the Mexican garrison in Nogales, Sonora, to points south that August in an attempt to quell armed political rebels.

Despite the Battle of Ambos Nogales controversy, the presence of the Buffalo Soldiers in the community left a significant impact on the border town. The famed jazz musician Charles Mingus was born in the Camp Stephen Little military base in Nogales in 1922, son of a Buffalo Soldier. The African American population, centered on the stationing of Buffalo Soldiers such as the 25th Infantry in Nogales, was a significant factor in the community, though they often faced racial discrimination in the binational border community in addition to racial segregation at the elementary-school level in Nogales's Grand Avenue/Frank Reed School (a school reserved for black children). The redeployment of the Buffalo Soldiers to other areas and the closure of Camp Little in 1933 initiated the decline of the African American community in Nogales.

== World War II ==
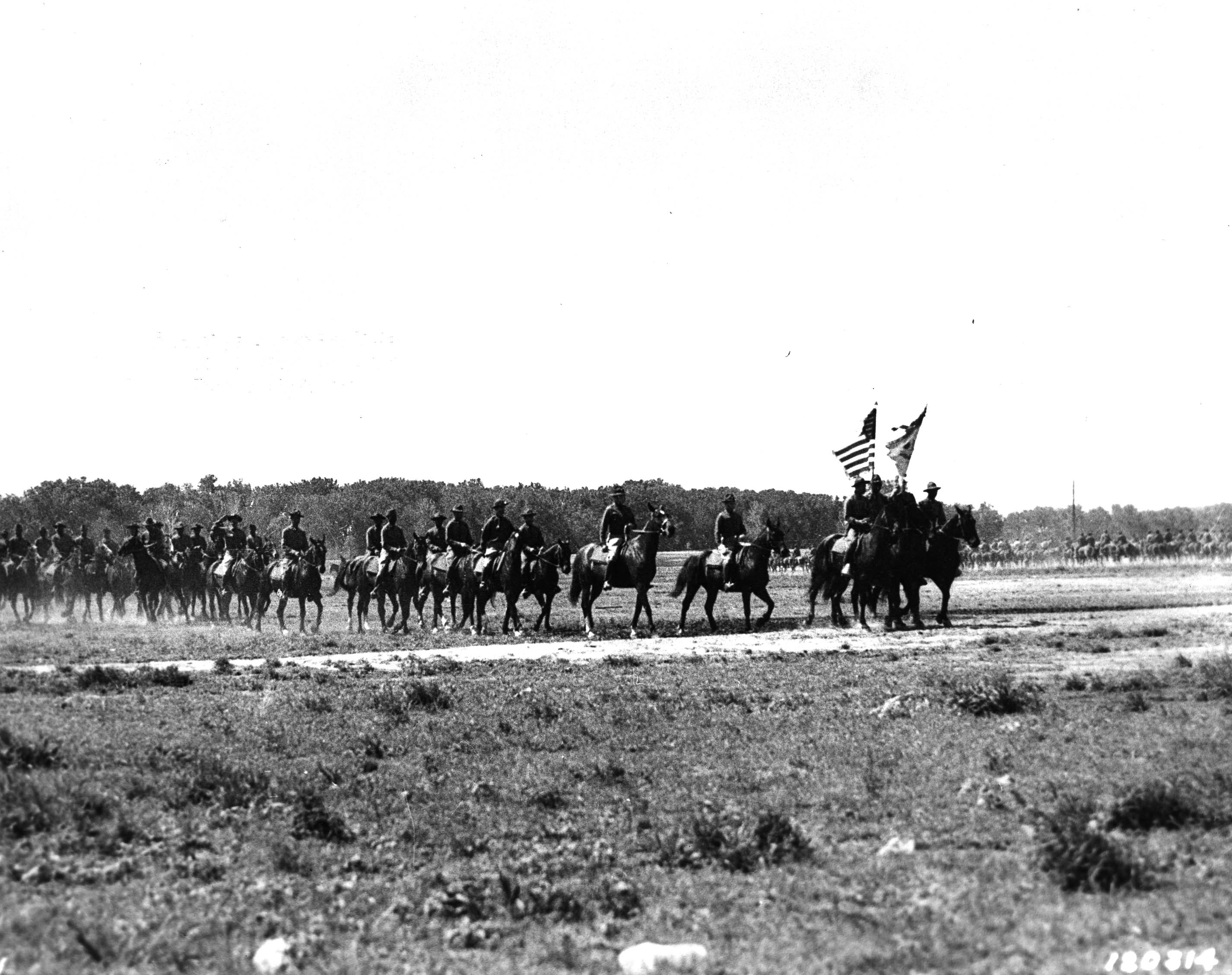
With colors flying and guidons down, the lead troops of the famous 9th Cavalry pass in review at the regiment's new home in rebuilt Camp Funston, Ft. Riley, Kansas, May 1941.

Before World War II, the black 25th Infantry Regiment was based at Ft Huachuca (Arizona). During the war, Ft Huachuca served as the home base of the Black 92nd and 93rd Infantry Divisions. The 9th and 10th Cavalry Regiments were mostly disbanded, and the soldiers were moved into service-oriented units, along with the entire 2nd Cavalry Division. The 92nd Infantry Division, the "Buffalo Division", served in combat during the Italian campaign. The 93rd Infantry Division—including the 25th Infantry Regiment—served in the Pacific theater. Separately, independent Black artillery, tank, and tank destroyer battalions, as well as quartermaster and support battalions served in World War II. All of these units to a degree carried out the traditions of the Buffalo Soldiers.

Despite some official resistance and administrative barriers, Black airmen were trained and played a part in the air war in Europe, gaining a reputation for skill and bravery (see Tuskegee Airmen). In early 1945, after the Battle of the Bulge, American forces in Europe experienced a shortage of combat troops, so the embargo on using black soldiers in combat units was relaxed. The American Military History says:

Faced with a shortage of infantry replacements during the enemy's counteroffensive, General Eisenhower offered black soldiers in service units an opportunity to volunteer for duty with the infantry. More than 4,500 responded, many taking reductions in grade to meet specified requirements. The 6th Army Group formed these men into provisional companies, while the 12th Army Group employed them as an additional platoon in existing rifle companies. The excellent record established by these volunteers, particularly those serving as platoons, presaged major postwar changes in the traditional approach to employing Black troops.

== Korean War and Desegregation ==
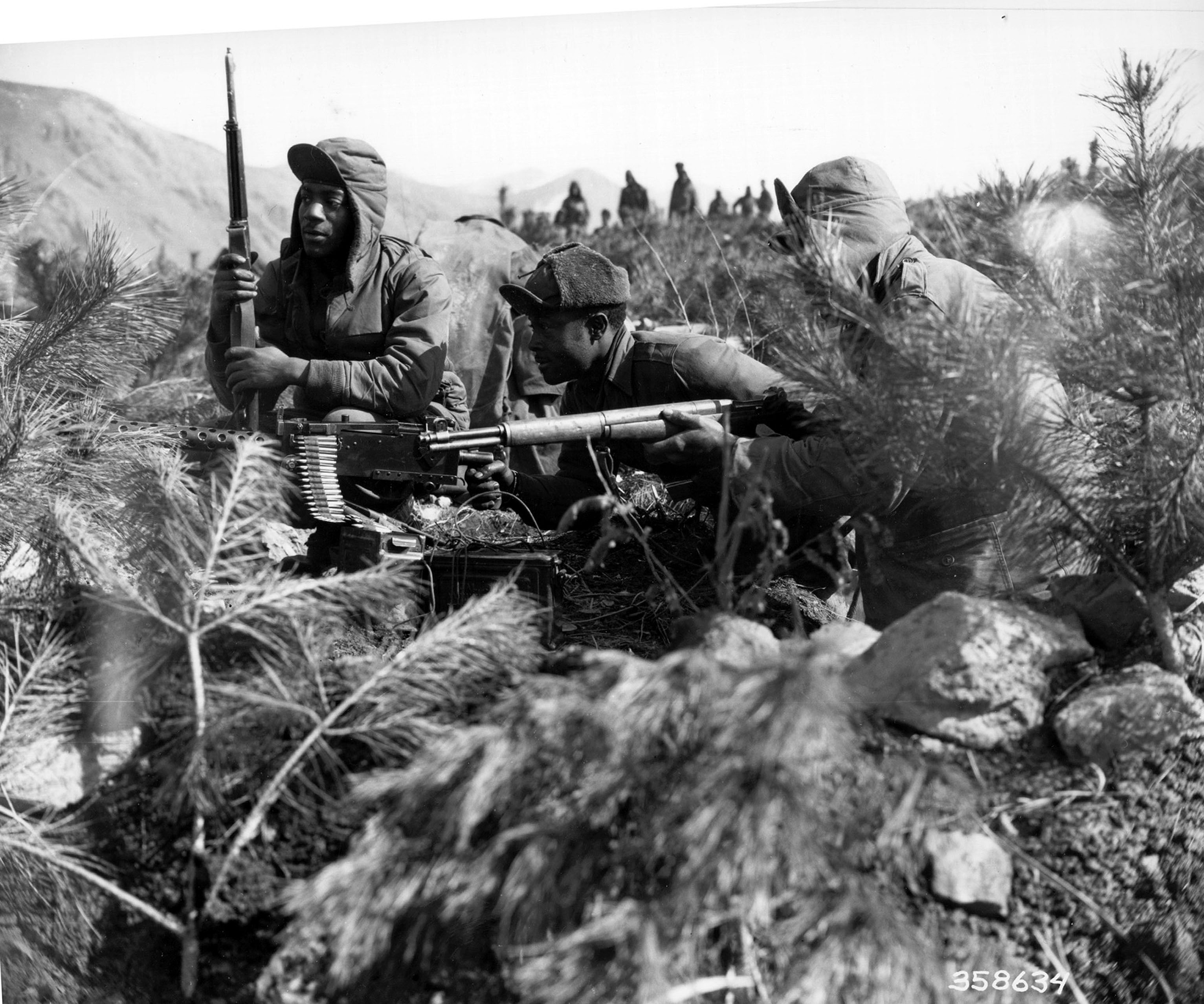
A machine gun crew of Co. A, 24th Infantry Regiment, during Korean War, 21 February 1951

In 1948, President Harry Truman signed Executive Order 9981, which desegregated the military and marked the first federal piece of legislation that went against the societal norms implemented through Jim Crow laws. During the Korean War, black and white troops operated in integrated units for the first time.

The 24th Infantry Regiment saw combat during the Korean War and was the last segregated regiment to engage in combat. The 24th was deactivated in 1951, and its soldiers were integrated into other units in Korea. On December 12, 1951, the last Buffalo Soldier units, the 27th Cavalry and the 28th (Horse) Cavalry, were disbanded. The 28th Cavalry was inactivated at Assi-Okba, Algeria, in April 1944 in North Africa, and marked the end of the regiment.

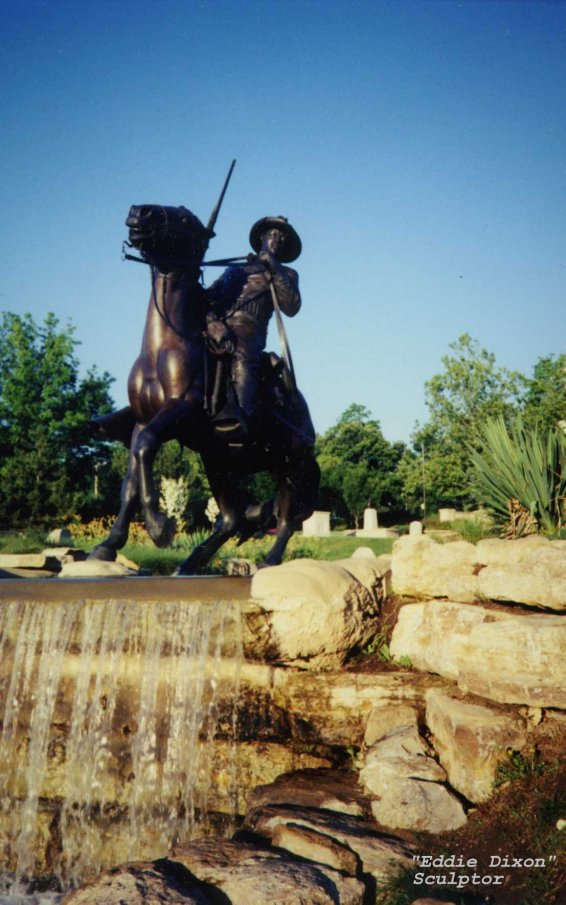
Buffalo Soldier Monument on Fort Leavenworth, Kansas

Monuments to the Buffalo Soldiers are in Kansas at Fort Leavenworth and Junction City. Then–Chairman of the Joint Chiefs of Staff Colin Powell, who initiated the project to get a statue to honor the Buffalo Soldiers when he was posted as a brigadier general to Fort Leavenworth, was guest speaker for the unveiling of the Fort Leavenworth monument in July 1992.

== American Indian Wars ==
In the 21st century, the employment of the Buffalo Soldiers by the United States Army in the American Indian Wars has led some to call for the critical reappraisal of the African American regiments. In the opinion of some, the Buffalo Soldiers were used as mere shock troops or accessories to the forceful settler-colonialist and westward expansionist ambitions of the Federal U.S. government done at the expense of American Indian tribes.

== Legacy and honors ==
=== Memorials ===
In 1973, West Point Academy would become the first military academy to honor the Buffalo Soldier, renaming the area at the academy where the Buffalo Soldiers trained future officers "Buffalo Soldier Field" and placing a memorial rock at the northeast corner of the field.

The Buffalo Soldier Monument by American sculptor Eddie Dixon was installed at the United States Military Academy in West Point, New York, in 2021.

A monument dedicated to the Buffalo Soldiers, Fort Leavenworth, Kansas, were initiated and dedicated in 1992 by Gen. Colin Powell to the memory of the 9th & 10th Cavalry Regiments in the United States Army that were once only made up of black soldiers.

On March 25, 2013, the Charles Young Buffalo Soldiers National Monument under the Antiquities Act of 1906 was designated by United States President Barack Obama as a unit of the National Park Service. The 19th-century house museum also has an exhibit on African American soldier, Charles Young and the Buffalo Soldiers.

On February 20, 2014, officials at the United States Army post, Fort Bliss, changed the name of Robert E. Lee Road to Buffalo Soldier Road, recognizing the African-American units that moved through the fort in the 19th century; it also honors them since they protected American settlers in the west during the aftermath of the American Civil War.

On June 23, 2020, The El Paso, Texas City Council voted unanimously to rename Robert E. Lee Road in east-central El Paso as Buffalo Soldiers Road.

In September 2021, a new monument featuring a black soldier on horseback would be erected in honor of the Buffalo Soldiers on the west side of West Point Academy's Buffalo Soldier Field. The plaque from the original memorial rock that was dedicated in 1973 would also be relocated and placed at the base of the new statue.

=== Historical markers ===
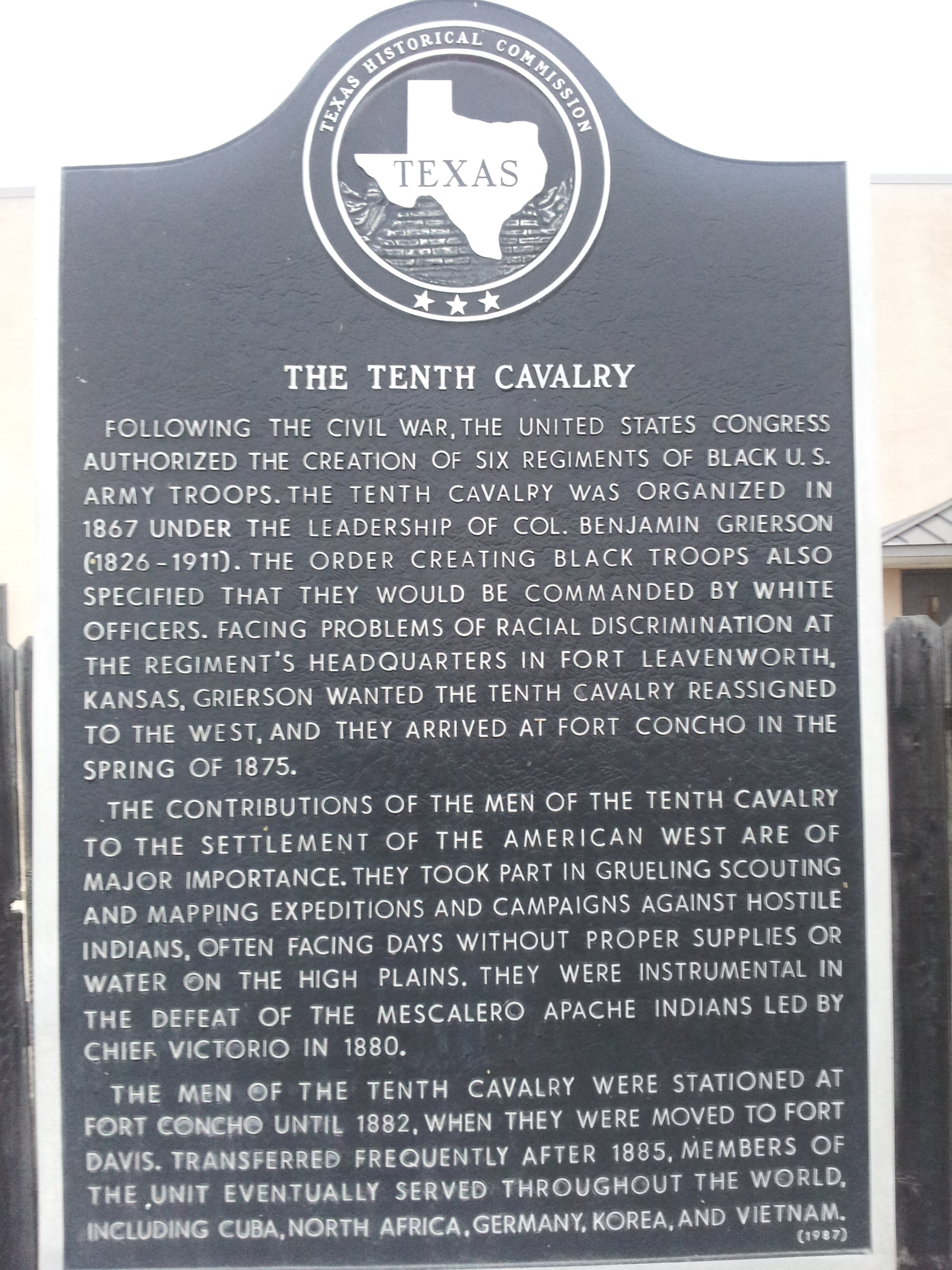
Fort Concho

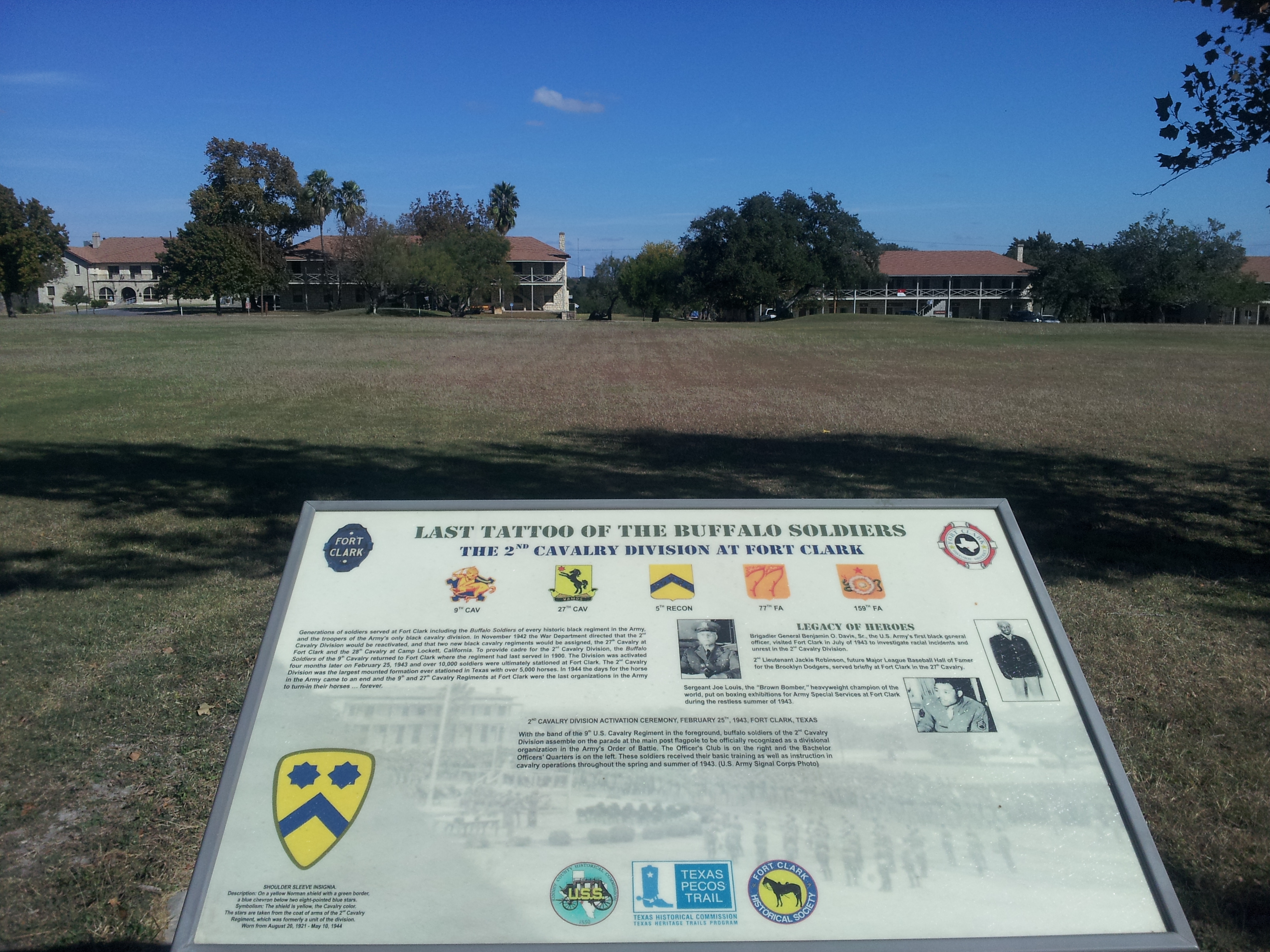
Fort Clark

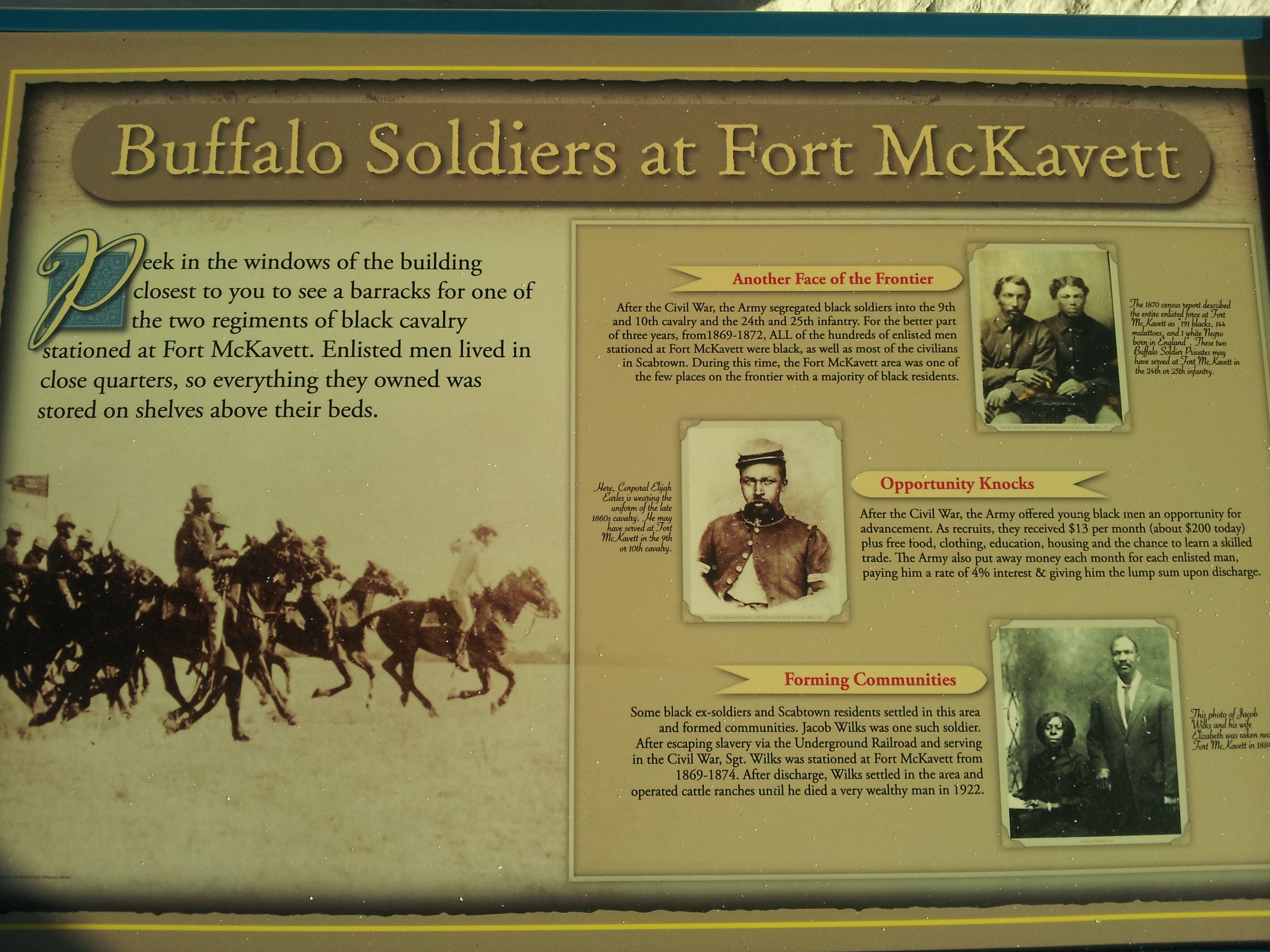
Fort McKavett

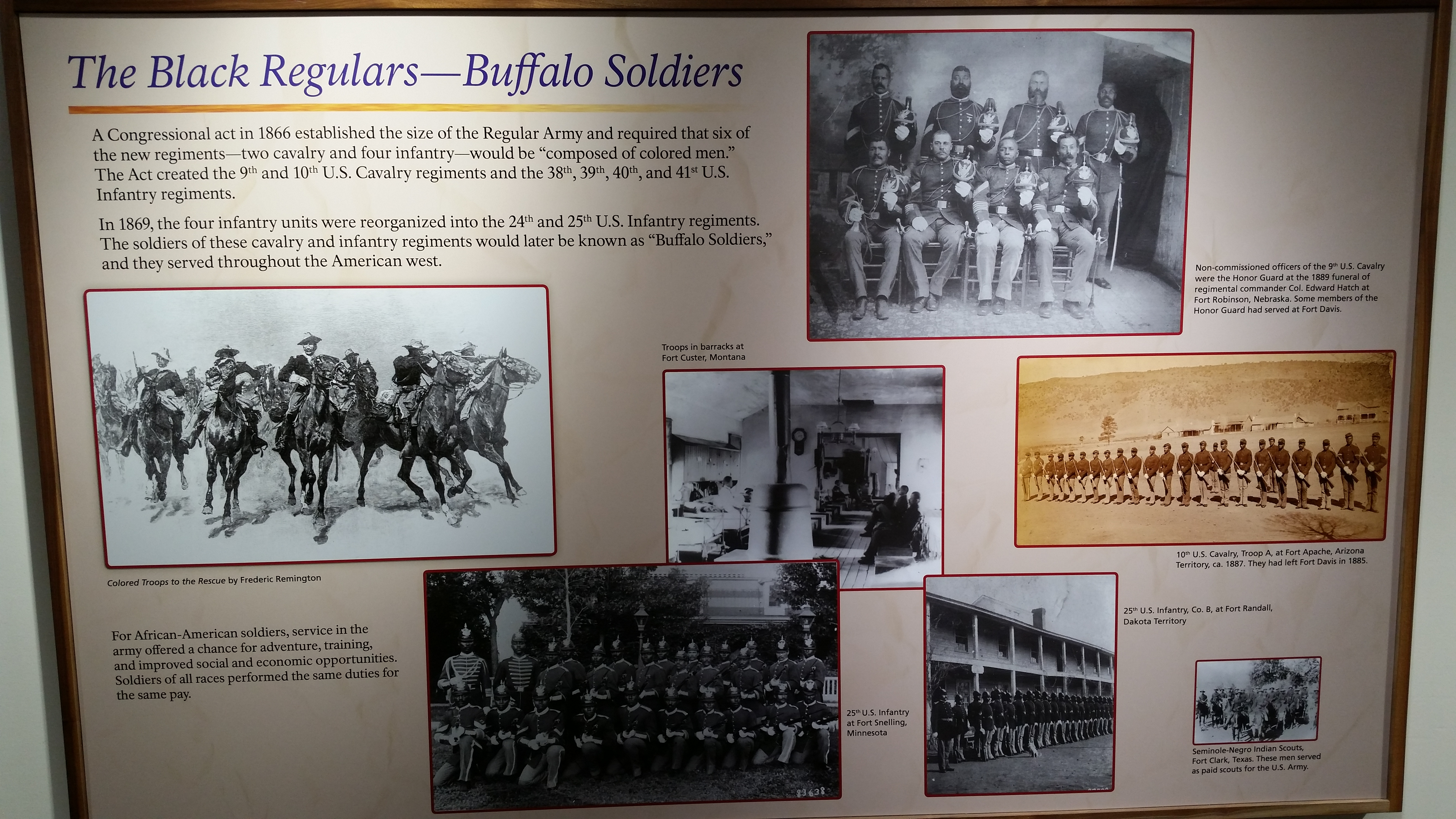
Fort Davis National Historic Site

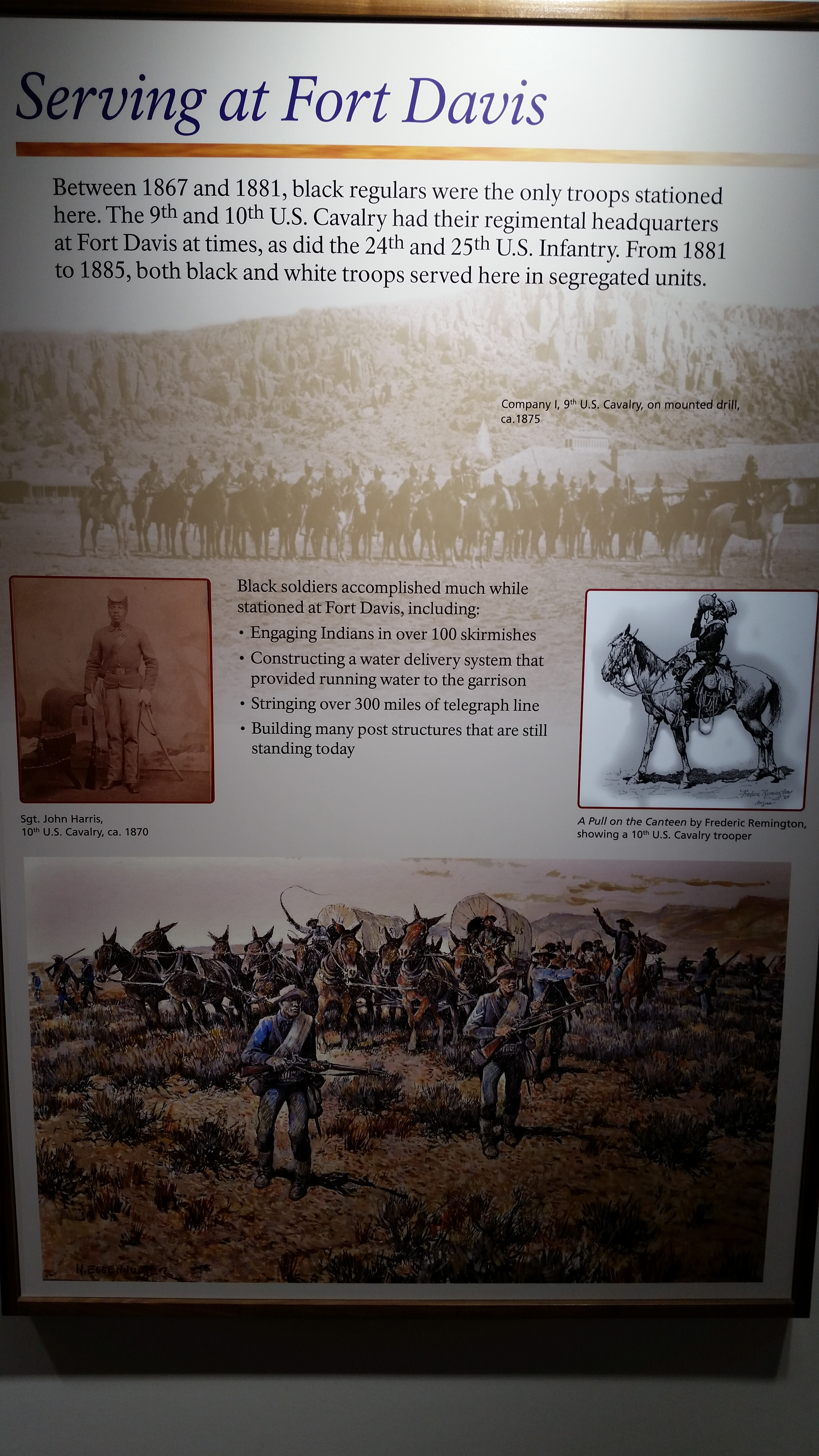
Buffalo Soldiers serving at Fort Davis

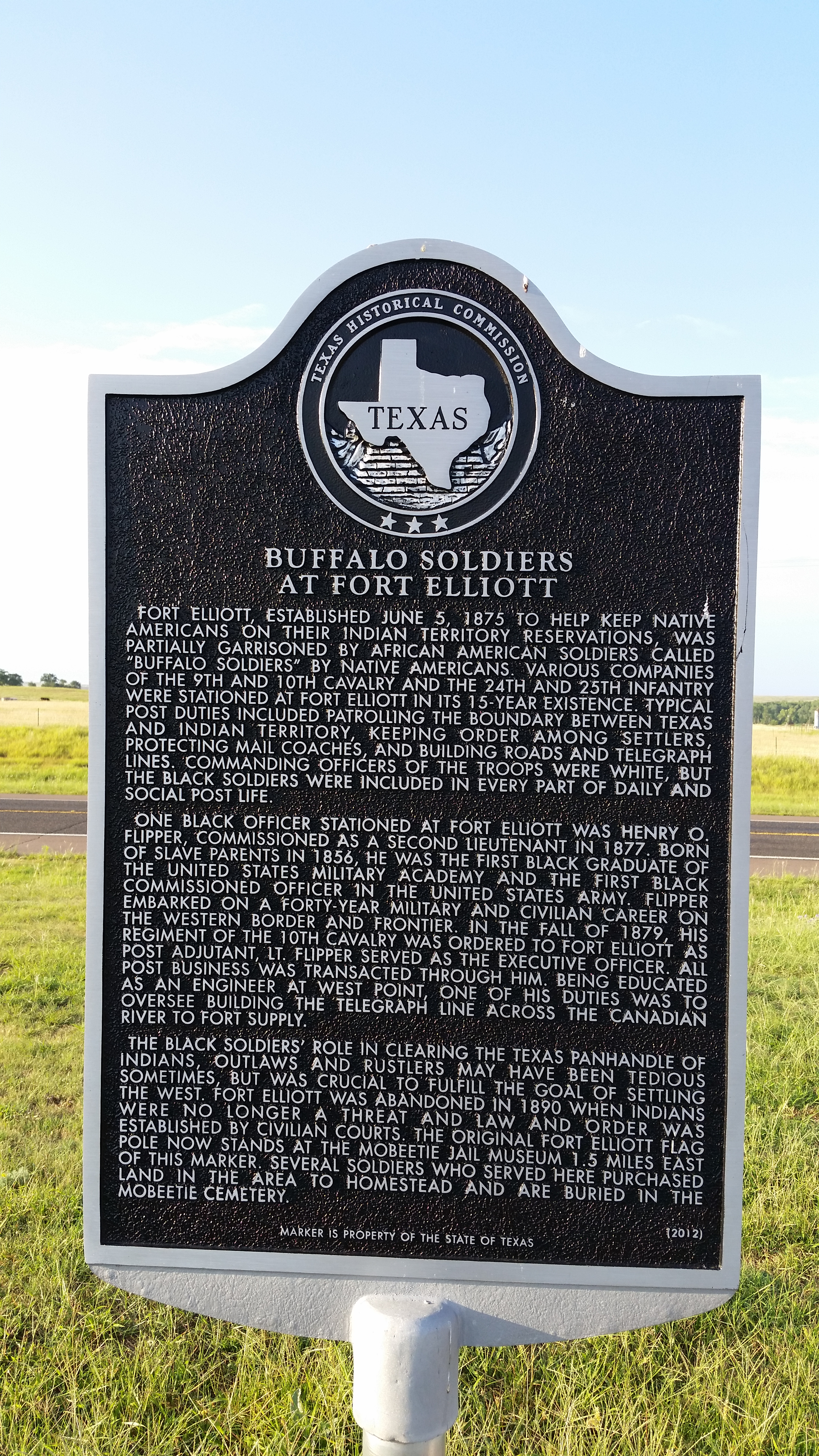
Fort Elliott

== In popular culture ==
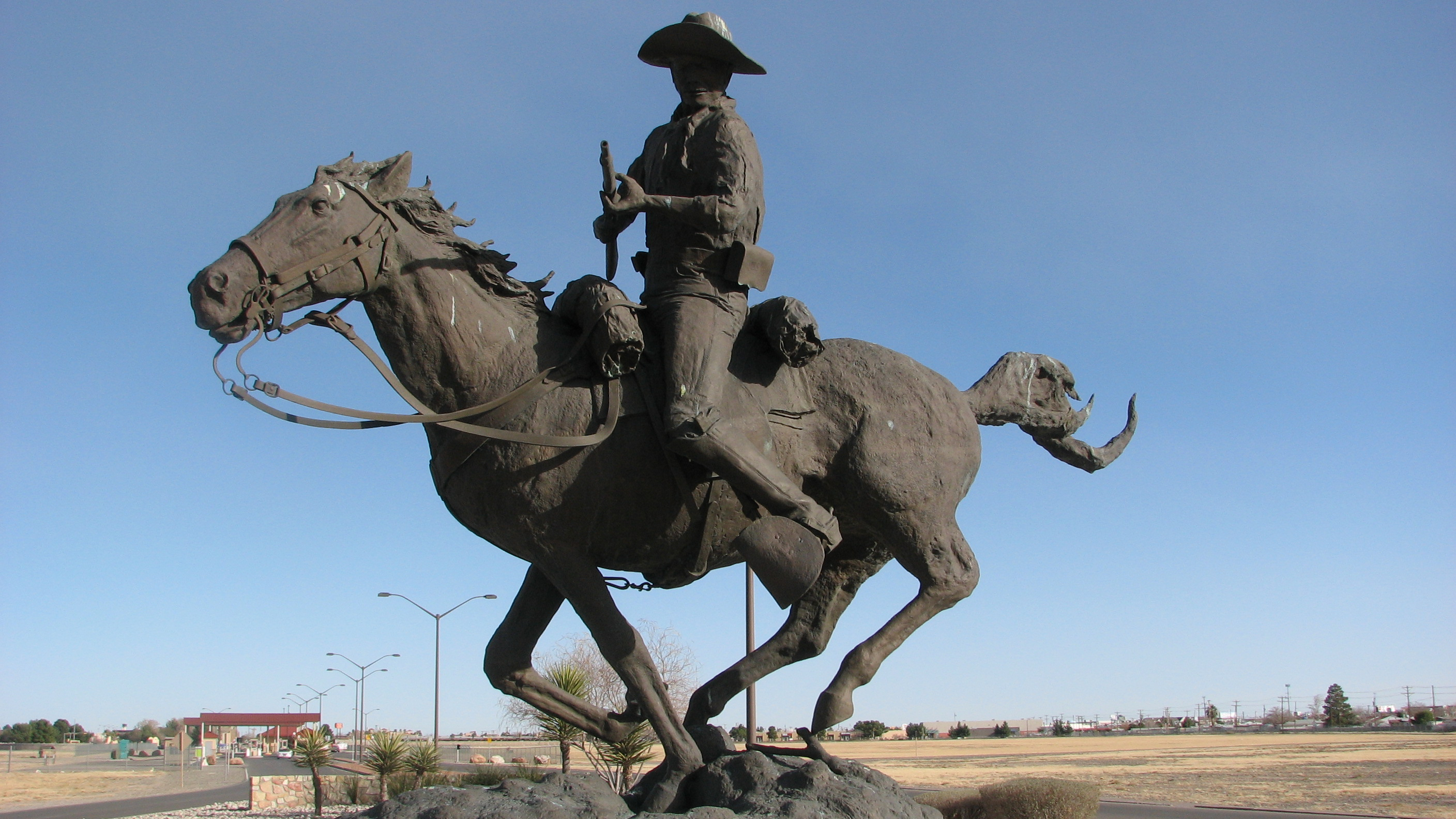
Buffalo Soldier Memorial of El Paso, in Fort Bliss, depicting CPL John Ross, I Troop, 9th Cavalry, in an encounter in the Guadalupe Mountains during the American Indian Wars

- At Fort Bliss, there is Buffalo Soldier Gate and Buffalo Soldier Visitor Center.
- The song and music of "Soul Saga (Song of the Buffalo Soldier)" has had several renditions. In 1974, it was produced by Quincy Jones in the album Body Heat. In 1975, the album Symphonic Soul contained another variation and was released by Henry Mancini and his Orchestra.
- The song "Buffalo Soldier", co-written by Bob Marley and King Sporty, first appeared on the 1983 album Confrontation. Many Jamaicans, especially Rastafarians like Marley, identified with the "Buffalo Soldiers" as an example of black men who performed with exceeding courage, honor, valor, and distinction in a field that was dominated by whites and persevered despite endemic racism and prejudice. Activist Dick Gregory criticised Marley for the song as early as 1979, allegedly referring to a demo tape recorded in 1978. The song aroused a great deal of interest and research and contributed to a differentiated reception.
- The song "Buffalo Soldier" by The Flamingos specifically refers to the 10th Cavalry Regiment. The song was a minor hit in 1970. A cappella group The Persuasions remade the song on their album Street Corner Symphony. This version was produced by David Dashev and Eric Malamud.
- The 1960 film Sergeant Rutledge directed by John Ford and starring Jeffrey Hunter, Constance Towers, Woody Strode and Billie Burke. The film starred Strode as Sergeant Rutledge, a Black first sergeant in a colored regiment of the United States Cavalry, the "Buffalo Soldiers". At a U.S. Army fort in the early 1880s, he is being tried by a court-martial for the rape and murder of a white girl as well as for the murder of the girl's father, who was the commanding officer of the fort.
- A 1961 episode of the television series Rawhide ("Incident of the Buffalo Soldier", season 3, episode 10, aired January 6, 1961) was about a former top sergeant Buffalo Soldier stationed at Fort Wingate.
- A 1964 episode of Rawhide ("Incident at Seven Fingers", season 6, episode 30, aired May 7, 1964) was about a top sergeant of Troop F, 110th Cavalry Regiment (played by William Marshall) who is accused of being a coward and a deserter. Other Buffalo Soldiers and an officer track him down.
- A 1968 episode of television series The High Chaparral ("The Buffalo Soldiers", season 2, episode 10, aired November 22, 1968), starring Yaphet Kotto, had the 10th Cavalry, C Company called in to establish martial law at the request of the citizens of Tucson, to help relieve it from the grip of a crime boss.
- The 1976 film Joshua, starring Fred Williamson, tells the story of a black soldier who, returned from fighting for the Union in the Civil War, becomes a bounty hunter determined to track down his mother's killers.
- The 1997 television film Buffalo Soldiers directed by Charles Haid and starring an ensemble cast including Lamont Bentley, Tom Bower, Timothy Busfield, Gabriel Casseus, Danny Glover, Bob Gunton, Keith Jefferson, Robert Knott, Carl Lumbly, Clifton Powell, Matt Ross, Glynn Turman, Michael Warren, and Mykelti Williamson. Set in 1880, the film tells the true story of the black cavalry corps known as the Buffalo Soldiers, who protected the Western territories after the end of the Civil War.
- A character named Buffalo Soldier makes an appearance in Rockstar Games' 2004 Red Dead Revolver. Buffalo Soldier also makes an appearance in the Red Dead Redemption Legends and Killers pack as a returnable character.
- The 2017 Netflix Western series Godless has a camp of former Buffalo Soldiers that have turned to farming (their fighting days behind them). In the series it is explained that the term "Buffalo Soldier" is derived from when John Randall held off 70 Indians with only a pistol, having killed 13 of them while he sustained multiple wounds. This explanation however is largely fictitious.

== Medal of Honor recipients (1866–1918) ==
This list is of the officers and men who received the Medal of Honor for service with the original units called "Buffalo Soldiers".

- Edward L. Baker, Jr.
- Dennis Bell
- Thomas Boyne
- Benjamin Brown
- George Ritter Burnett
- Louis H. Carpenter
- Powhatan Henry Clarke
- John Denny
- Pompey Factor
- Clinton Greaves
- Henry Johnson
- George Jordan
- Fitz Lee
- Isaiah Mays
- William McBryar
- Adam Paine
- Isaac Payne
- Thomas Shaw
- Emanuel Stance
- Freddie Stowers
- William H. Thompkins
- Augustus Walley
- George H. Wanton
- John Ward
- Moses Williams
- William Othello Wilson
- Brent Woods

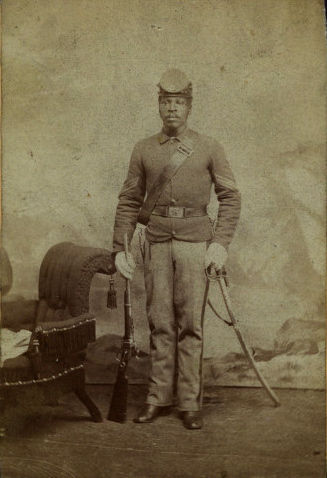
Sgt. John Harris of the 10th U.S. Cavalry with a Sharps rifle, c. 1868.

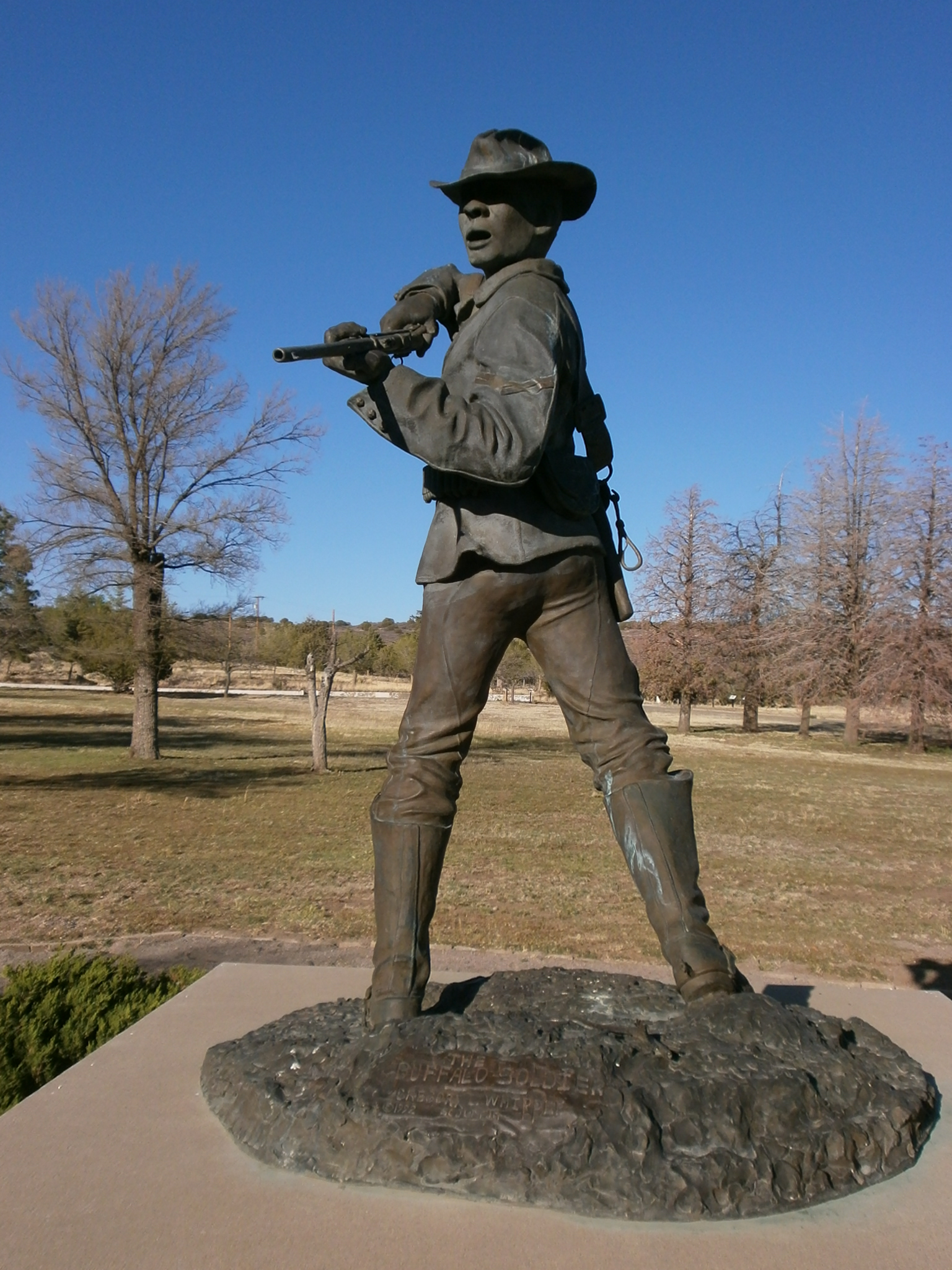
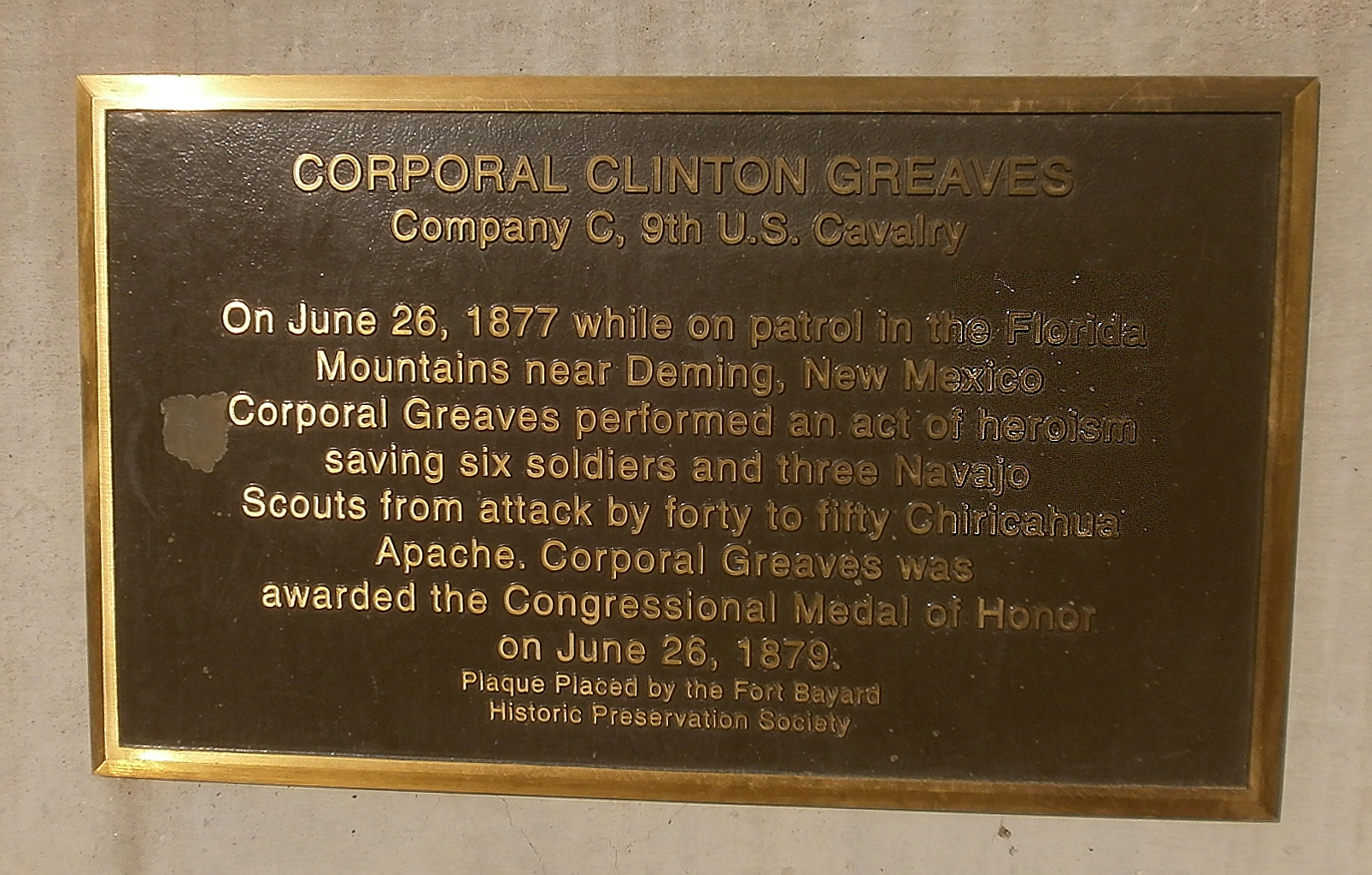
Memorial to Medal of Honor recipient Corporal Clinton Greaves, 9th US Cavalry, at Fort Bayard, New Mexico

== Other prominent members ==
This list is of other notable African Americans who served in the original units as "Buffalo Soldiers" from 1866 to 1918.

- John Hanks Alexander
- Allen Allensworth
- Lewis Broadus
- Charles C. Dawson
- Henry Ossian Flipper
- Edward W. Pearson, Sr.
- Charles Young
- Cathay Williams

== See also ==
- Bicycle infantry
- Bisbee Riot
- Battle of the Saline River – one of the first combats of the 10th
- Black Seminoles (Cimarrones)
- Black Seminole Scouts
- List of African-American Medal of Honor recipients
- Military history of African Americans
- Racial segregation in the United States Armed Forces
- Camp Lockett
- Buffalo Soldier tragedy of 1877, also known as the "Staked Plains Horror"
- "Colonel" Charles Long
- The Buffalo Saga, memoirs of James H. Daugherty of the 92nd Infantry in World War II
- Tuskegee Airmen
- 1st Louisiana Native Guard
- 2nd Cavalry Division
- 92nd Infantry Division
- 93rd Infantry Division
- 366th Infantry Regiment
- 761st Tank Battalion
- 784th Tank Battalion
- MV Buffalo Soldier, a maritime prepositioning ship, used by the Military Sealift Command
- Tangipahoa African American Heritage Museum & Black Veteran Archives
- Buffalo Soldiers MC, a motorcycle club.
