= Lewis Broadus =

American Buffalo Soldier (1877–1961)

Captain Lewis Broadus
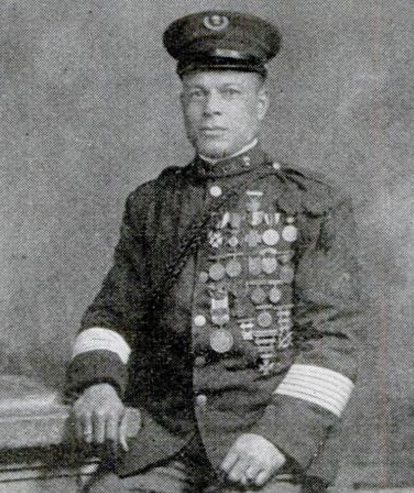
- Born: Louis Cunningham; July 24, 1877; Henrico County, Virginia, U.S.
- Died: June 23, 1961 (aged 83); Jamaica, Queens, U.S.
- Spouse(s): Florence Blackwood (m. 1897) Edith McClenny (m. 1931)
- Military career
- Allegiance: United States
- Branch: United States Army
- Service years: 1897–1923
- Rank: Captain
- Nickname: "Cap"
- Units: 25th Infantry Regiment; 92nd Division
- Conflicts: Spanish–American War; Battle of El Caney; Siege of Santiago; Philippine–American War; World War I
- Awards: Distinguished Service Cross
- Other work: Special Officer, Mount Vernon PD; Alcohol Tax Division, New York City

Captain Lewis Cunningham Broadus (1877–1961) was a Buffalo Soldier born in Henrico County, Virginia, who served his country with distinction in the 25th Infantry Regiment and the 92nd Division of the United States Army. He served from 1897 to 1923, and was a combat veteran of the Spanish–American War, Philippine–American War, and World War I.

He began his military career as a private in Company D, 25th Infantry Regiment. Over the course of many military campaigns and special assignments, Lewis rose to the ranks of regimental-sergeant major, and ordnance sergeant. With the United States' entry into World War I, and after many petitions and commendations, he attended officer training with the 17th Provisional Training Regiment at Fort Des Moines in 1917. He successfully commissioned as a captain, one of 639 newly commissioned African-American line-officers, at a time where only three existed previously.

Lewis was awarded a Certificate of Merit for "coolness, presence of mind, and bravery in saving lives of others at Fort Niobrara," by President Theodore Roosevelt in 1906. After the Certificate of Merit Medal was declared obsolete in 1918, his medal was first exchanged for the newly established Distinguished Service Medal, and, after a change in award regulations by Congress in 1934, converted into the Distinguished Service Cross.

== Background and personal life ==
Born on July 24, 1877, in Richmond, Virginia, he was the son of an Irish slave owner, Louis Cunningham, and an enslaved African woman, who today is known only as Lizzie. He appears in the U.S. Census dated June 3, 1880, Henrico County, Virginia, as Louis Cunningham, age three. After the untimely death of his mother, he was raised by the Broadus family, listed in the census as "Arthur- stable hand", his son "David- tobacco hand", and daughter "Mary- washerwoman". He later changed his name to Lewis Broadus.

While stationed at Fort Custer, Montana, he met and married Florence Blackwood, a young Native American woman of the Lakota (Sioux) born of the Burnt Thigh Tiyóšpaye Band, which was later named the Rosebud Sioux, during the time period when the Dakota Territory became the State of South Dakota. After marrying, Lewis decided to make the U.S. Army his career, which involved frequent postings to many different areas of the country. Postings required many adjustments to new communities such as new local military schools and new neighborhoods for his young family, which then consisted of Lewis, Florence, daughter Mabel, and son Ernest. After the death of his first wife, Florence, Lewis remarried in 1931. He and his second wife Edith McClenny had a daughter, Elizabeth.

== Military career ==
After the end of the Civil War and just eight years before his birth, the U.S. Army had established four African American regiments which became the 24th and the 25th Infantry, and the 9th and the 10th Cavalry. At age twenty, on January 20, 1897, he enlisted as a young volunteer in the 25th Infantry and was sent to Fort Custer, Montana. Shortly after, he was sent to fight in America's first overseas conflict, the Spanish American War.

=== Spanish–American War ===
Since 1885, Cuba had been fighting for independence from Spain. In 1898, when the battleship USS Maine exploded in Havana Harbor, American troops were mobilized for war. The African American regiments of the 24th and 25th Infantry and 9th and 10th Cavalry were in the forefront of the fighting. Lewis Broadus saw combat at the Battle of El Caney. The following excerpt is an eyewitness account of charging the blockhouse at El Caney:

It has been reported that the 12th U.S. Infantry made the charge, assisted by the 25th Infantry, but it is a recorded fact that the 25th Infantry fought the battle alone, the 12th Infantry coming up after the firing had nearly ceased. Private T.C. Butler, Company H, 25th Infantry, was the first man to enter the blockhouse at El Caney, and took possession of the Spanish flag for his regiment. An officer of the 12th Infantry came up while Butler was in the house and ordered him to give up the flag, which he was compelled to do, but not until he had torn a piece off the flag to substantiate his report to his Colonel of the injustice which had been done to him. Thus, by using the authority given him by his shoulder straps, this officer took for his regiment that which had been won by the hearts' blood of some of the bravest, though black, soldiers of Shafter's army. The charge of El Caney has been little spoken of, but it was quite as great a show of bravery as the famous taking of San Juan Hill.

— Frank W. Pullen, Jr., Ex-Sergeant-Major 25th U.S. Infantry. Enfield, N.C., March 23, 1899.

African American troops bravely served their country, but the U.S. War Department refused to promote African American men as commissioned officers. Lewis nonetheless requested promotion as he had distinguished himself by recovering the horses of the mounted officers at great personal risk, and also saved the lives of four men of the regiment. In a letter to Captain W.S. Scott, Company G, 25th Infantry, Fort McIntosh, Texas, dated September 4, 1899, he wrote the following:

Sir

I have the honor to request that the Capt. will recommend me to the War Dept. for an appointment as a commissioned officer in the Volunteer regiment which was ordered a few days ago. My service in the army is from Jan. 28/97 to the present time and in the present company. I served in the Spanish American War in early 1898. Battles El cancy [sic], under fire July 2nd and 3rd, and before Santiago, 10th and 11th, 1898. I was among the first to charge the blockhouse at El cancy [sic] and on the night of July 2, I volunteered to go back through the bamboo jungles and got some papers, horses, and a part of the lost platoons. I brought them to the firing line in the morning of the 3rd and I volunteered to go with Lt. O'Neil over on the bluff to take observation of the Spanish guns, which the Captain knows was a danger in it. Hoping this will meet your approval.

Very respectfully,

Lewis Broadus

Company G, 25th Infantry, Fort McIntosh, Texas

=== Philippine-American War ===
Following the surrender of Spain and ceding of Puerto Rico, Guam, and the Philippines to the United States, Filipino nationalists (Insurectos) began launching attacks against the American forces. Lewis reported to the Presidio, which was then a military training base located on the tip of the San Francisco Peninsula, while on the way to the Philippines in early 1899. Upon arrival in the pacific on August 1, the 25th regiment was stationed on Mindanao, the second-largest island of the archipelago, and engaged in numerous skirmishes. Lewis was recommended for a commission as a Lieutenant to serve with the Philippine Scouts but was denied.

=== Inter-war Service ===
Upon the regiment's return to the U.S. in 1902, he was sent back to the frontier to patrol and defend what was called the "Indian Territories"—the Western Plains region. An incident occurred while he served as 1st sergeant at Fort Niobrara, Nebraska on July 3, 1906. A memorandum from the acting secretary of the U.S. War Department, Office of the Chief of Staff, Washington, dated September 1906 states:

At breakfast on July 3, 1906, Sergeant Thompson gave orders to Private William Burnett, Co. M, 25th Infantry, who replied in abusive language and reported Thompson to the company commander for abuse. The company commander investigated the complaint and ordered Burnett in arrest and to prepare for trial by summary court. Burnett seemed sullen after this, and a little before 1 p.m. was again warned to prepare for trial. About 1 p.m. Thompson was near the outer door of the 2d squad room of Co. M, 25th Infantry, many men, including 1st Sergeant Broadus, being in the room. The door opened, and Private Burnett stepped in with a rifle and pointed it at Thompson. Broadus sprang forward, seized the rifle near the muzzle, and deflected it upward just as it was fired, the flame and bullet passing between his face and upraised shoulder. Broadus was in imminent danger in performing this act, and had just time to seize the rifle before it was fired. If Broadus had not seized the rifle just as he did, Thompson or one of the many men in line of fire would have been shot.

He was awarded the Certificate of Merit Medal on Sept. 25, 1906, by President Theodore Roosevelt.

Later that year, the 25th was transferred to Texas, with Lewis garrisoned at Fort McIntosh. In 1907, he, along with sergeant “Doc” L. Harril and Private William Parks, represented the garrison in a department-wide shooting competition in San Antonio, Texas.

The 25th Infantry Regiment deployed to the Philippines for a second time in 1906. Unlike their first tour during the war, they primarily served guard, escort, and police duties. A few minor expeditions against the Moros were the only military confrontations of the tour. The regiment returned to the U.S. in 1907, assuming various postings in the West.

On May 2, 1914, Lewis was designated an ordnance sergeant, the staff non-commissioned officer responsible receiving and issuing all ordnance(artillery, weapons, ammunition) for a military installation. Additionally, he received orders to Oahu, Hawaii, where approximately 800 African American soldiers were housed in the Schofield Barracks, and later reported to the commanding general for duty with the Hawaii Department.

On April 24, 1916, he was assigned to special duty at the State Armory in Hartford, Connecticut, once again as ordnance sergeant, "assisting the property and disbursing officer for the State of Connecticut, per Special Orders #281 C.D. of Long Island Sound, Fort H.G. Wright, N.Y." Once again, he petitioned for appointment as "Commissioned Officer in the Colored Regiments" citing his exemplary service record:

Enlisted Jan. 20, 1897
Appointed Corporal and Sergeant Sept 25, 1898 Company D 25th Infantry
Promoted to 1st Sergeant July 26, 1900.
Served in Company D 25th Infantry to Feb 26, 1901
Transferred to Company M
Appointed Corporal Sergeant and 1st Sergeant Company M 25th Infantry
Served in Company M to May 19, 1912
Battalion Sergeant Major 25th Infantry to May 2, 1914
Ordnance Sergeant US Army from May 2, 1914 to 1917.
Awarded Certificate of Merit
Qualified as Expert Rifleman 1904, 05, 06, 07, 1910, 1912 and 1914.
Qualified as Expert Pistol Shot 1910, 1911, 1912, and 1913

==== Feature in The Crisis ====
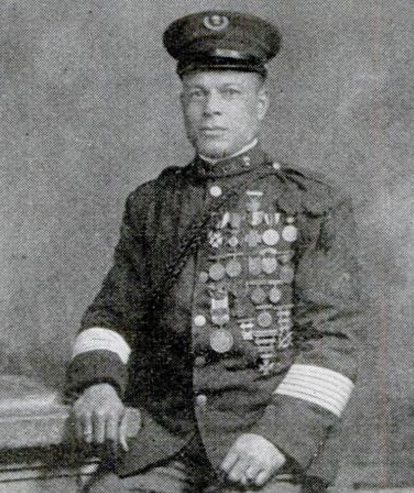
Lewis Broadus, as featured in The Crisis Magazine, June 1917

As W.E.B. DuBois had founded The Crisis magazine in 1910—the official publication of the National Association for the Advancement of Colored People, the June 1917 issue featured Broadus as one of four "outstanding men of the month." His photograph shows him in formal military dress wearing rank insignia on his left arm, black and gold service stripes above his wrists, ornamental braided cord across his chest, and over twenty medals from shoulder to waist. His feature in the magazine reads:

AN ARMY SERGEANT

Mr. Lewis Broadus has been in the U. S. Army for twenty-six years and has served in Cuba, Hawaii and the Philippines. In Cuba he distinguished himself by recovering the horses of the mounted officers at a great personal risk, and also saved the lives of four men of the regiment. He received a certificate of merit from President Roosevelt in 1906 for saving the life of Sergeant J. M. Thompson of Fort Niobrara, Nebraska. Mr. Broadus is now stationed at the State Armory at Hartford, Conn., by request of the Adjutant General of the State of Connecticut, to assist in the preparation of the ordnance returns.

=== World War I ===
As the United States entered World War I, the military experienced a rapid buildup, including the addition of over 350,000 colored recruits and draftees, and required additional colored officers to train the draftees, as well as lead them in the field.

Lewis took this opportunity to once again petition for promotion as commissioned officer and received another commendation. The letter was in support of sending him to, "the Reserves Officers Training Camp at Fort Des Moines, Iowa, for the term of his instruction commencing June 18, 1917 … [as] he is in a high degree the type of a soldier desired there." The 17th Provisional Training Regiment at Fort Des Moines was the first officer candidate class for African-Americans in history, consisting of 1,000 college graduates and 250 noncommissioned-officers. Lewis successfully completed the training and received his commission as a Captain in the National Army (one of 106 captains out of the total 639 newly commissioned African-American officers) on October 15, 1917. He was subsequently assigned duty at Camp Funston.

For the duration of the war, Lewis served with the 317th Train Headquarters and Military Police, 92nd Division under Colonel Isaac Jenks, who later commanded the unit which the soldiers alleged to have committed the Elaine massacre after the war's end belonged to.

Upon arrival in France and direct deployment of the division, the unit's primary mission was "to provide battlefield circulation control to support the division's move into the Marbache sector near Pont a Mousson," which entailed operating traffic control points, and evacuating and managing enemy prisoners of war. This mission was notably achieved with great efficiency that enabled the division to advance without a break in momentum.

After the war, the 92nd Division was dissolved, and Lewis continued his service in the military police, once again with the 25th Infantry Regiment.

== Retirement and legacy ==
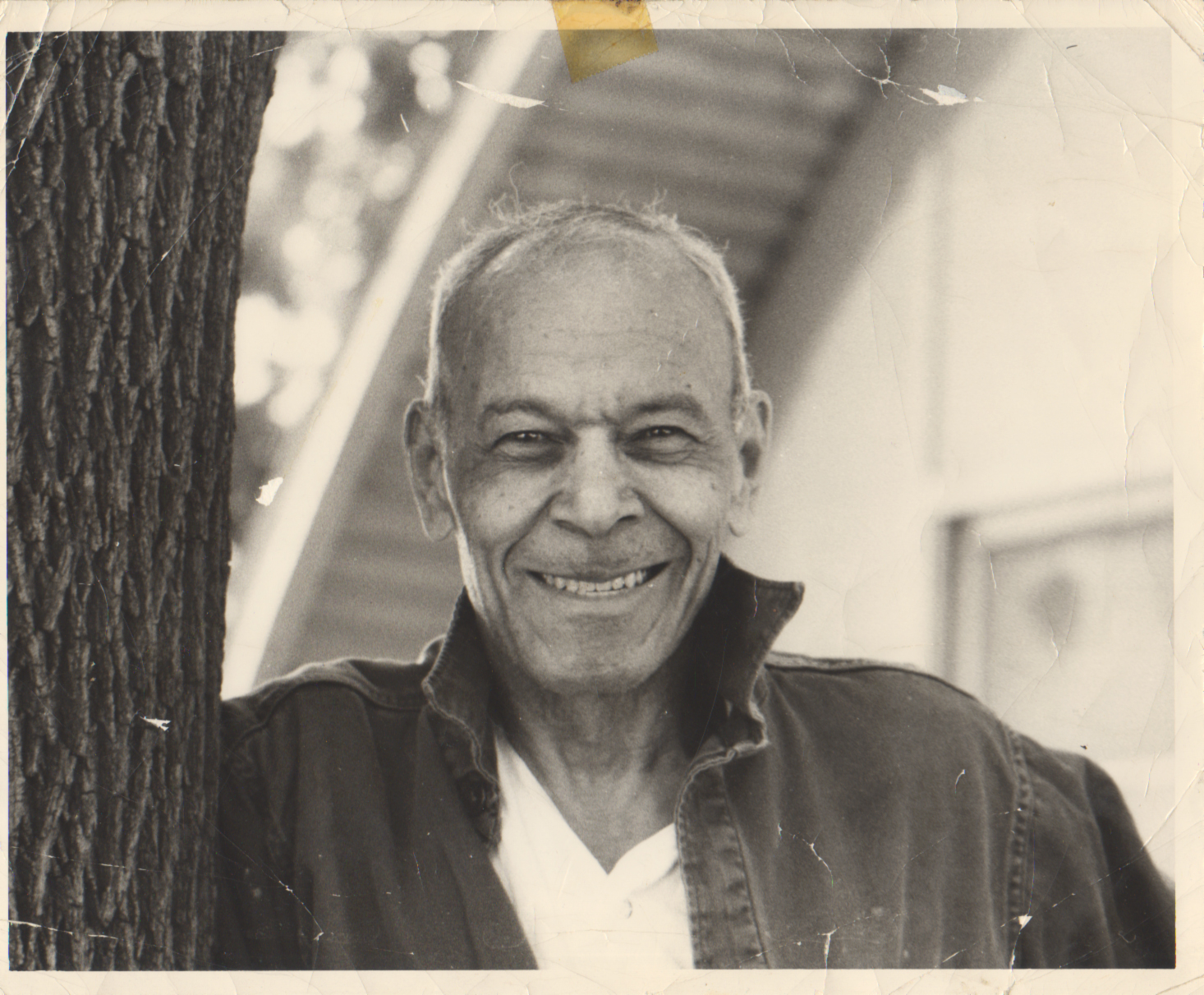
An elderly Lewis Broadus

After his military career ended, Lewis settled in the town of Mount Vernon, New York, where he worked as special officer for the Mount Vernon police department and was employed by the Alcohol Tax Division of NYC until his retirement in 1947. By 1961, he had served his country for 26 years with "impeccable military and combat credentials" and was one of the last remaining Spanish–American War veterans. He died at age 83 in Veterans Hospital in Jamaica, New York.

The Certificate of Merit Medal that he was awarded as a young man in 1906 by President Roosevelt had been converted to the Distinguished Service Medal in 1919. By the "Act of Congress approval March 5, 1934, authorization of the U.S. War Department," the Distinguished Service Medal was converted into the Distinguished Service Cross. This award was sent to his surviving family, who presented it as a gift to the Smithsonian National Museum of African American History and Culture in Washington, D.C., and accepted by the Museum's Curator of Collections. His military papers were donated to the Library of Virginia Foundation, on behalf of the Library of Virginia.

=== Citation ===
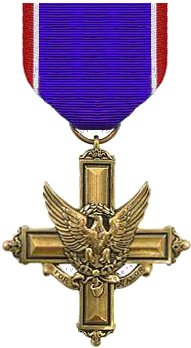

The President of the United States of America, authorized by Act of Congress, July 9, 1918, takes pleasure in presenting the Distinguished Service Cross, in lieu of a previously issued Certificate of Merit and Distinguished Service Medal, to First Sergeant Lewis Broadus, United States Army, for coolness, presence of mind, and bravery in saving lives of others at Fort Niobrara, Nebraska, on 3 July 1906, while serving as a member of Company M, 25th Infantry Regiment.

== Awards and decorations ==

Distinguished Service Cross (United States); Upgraded from a Distinguished Service Medal, converted from an initially awarded Certificate of Merit.	World War I Victory Medal (United States)	Spanish Campaign Medal	Philippine Campaign Medal
Mexican Service Medal	Indian Campaign Medal	Army of Cuban Occupation Medal	Mexican Border Service Medal

- Expert Rifleman (1904, 1905, 1906, 1907, 1910, 1912, 1914)
- Expert Pistol Shot (1910, 1911, 1912, 1913)
