= Robert Dixon (soldier) =

American World War II veteran (1921–2024)

Robert Walter Dixon (September 11, 1921 – November 15, 2024) was an American World War II veteran who was the last surviving member of the U.S. Army’s all-Black regiment known as the Buffalo Soldiers.

== Early life ==
Dixon was born in Manhattan. He was one of five children born to Benjamin Dixon and Louise Dixon (née Williams). Dixon grew up in New York City.

== Military service ==
At the start of World War II in 1941, Dixon enlisted in the Army, serving as a corporal in Buffalo Soldiers. Dixon would be stationed at West Point Academy in Hudson Valley, where he was among the Buffalo Soldiers who trained cadets in mounted tactics and horseback riding.

== Post-World War II life ==
After World War II ended, Dixon opted to stay in the Hudson Valley area, working at an I.B.M. facility in Poughkeepsie, New York. At the time of his retirement from I.B.M. in 1977, Dixon served as manager for a unit that built computer motherboards.

== Later life ==
After retiring from I.B.M., Dixon, who was now also remarried, moved his extended family to Albany, New York. From 1977 to 2013, Dixon worked in the Central Baptist Church in Salt Point, New York, eventually serving as the church's part time pastor for 19 years. As a pastor, he was also active in civic affairs. He would help create the Community Police Review Board in Albany, serving as its chair from 1984 to 1998. He also led a commission to build a memorial for Rev. Dr. Martin Luther King Jr. in Albany. From 1998 to 2005, Dixon was president of the Empire Baptist Missionary Convention of New York, an association of Black churches.

Dixon returned to West Point in 2021 to visit a newly erected Buffalo Soldiers monument later on the open grasslands where the Buffalo Soldiers at the academy had trained future officers. The area would in 1973 become known as "Buffalo Soldier Field."

== Personal life and death ==
By 1977, Dixon was married to Georgia Bryant. He and Georgia each had children from previous marriages.

Dixon died at a rehabilitation center located near Albany, New York, on November 15, 2024, at the age of 103.
