= Charles Long (ABSRA) =

American criminal

"Colonel" Charles "Chuck" Long (born 1945) is the founder of the America's Buffalo Soldiers Re-Enactors Association. (The title of colonel is self-styled. Long only attained the rank of Lance Corporal while serving in the United States Marines.)

Long is best known as the operator of two controversial and short-lived youth recruit training boot camps in Arizona based on the Buffalo Soldiers, African American cavalry regiments of the 19th century, and the teachings of fundamentalist Christianity.

Long, a history buff, founded the ABSRA as an entertainment venture, allegedly for a Western movie that was never filmed. Long earned several awards for his re-enacting work and appeared in photographs shaking hands with Secretary of State Colin Powell and then-Texas Governor George W. Bush. Later the ABSRA focused on history education: giving speeches at schools and marching in military parades.

In 2000, Long first had the idea of establishing a youth boot camp on the Fort Apache Reservation from NBA legend (and fellow history buff) Kareem Abdul-Jabbar, who had recently coached a basketball camp for Apache children.

A first boot camp established by Long near Whiteriver, Arizona was investigated and ordered off of tribal land in July 2000 by the Apache Tribal Council after youths told of being kicked and choked by camp drill instructors. No charges were pressed as a result of this incident.

A second camp was opened by Long near Buckeye, Arizona in the Spring of 2001. Shortly afterward, on July 2, Anthony Haynes, a 14-year-old boy who had been enrolled in the camp by his mother, died after apparently hallucinating in 111 °F (43 °C) temperatures. Witnesses reported seeing Haynes eating handfuls of dirt and shouting that he was being attacked by Indians. Long maintains that Haynes committed suicide.

After the death of Haynes, troubling reports of violence and deception in Long's past began to emerge:

- In 1989, Long was arrested by Phoenix police after bashing in his ex-girlfriend's front door with a sledgehammer.
- In 1991, Long was arrested again for punching the same woman during a dispute over their 3-year-old son. According to court records, the woman told police Long had previously abused her and the child. Long was fined and put on probation.
- On his 1992 résumé, Long claimed to hold a political science degree from Wilberforce University. The school denies that Long ever earned a degree.
- Long also claimed to be a former director of the National Academy of Broadcasting. The academy maintains that there is no record of his employment.

Long was harshly criticized by Maricopa County Sheriff Joe Arpaio, himself well known for a "get tough" attitude towards prisoners, who pressed criminal charges against Long and several counselors at his camp. Long faced a charge of second degree murder, but was ultimately convicted in January 2005 of manslaughter and aggravated assault. Long was sentenced to six years in prison. The ABSRA continues to operate, though is no longer involved with youth boot camps.
