= 25th Infantry Regiment (United States) =

Racially-segregated infantry unit of the U.S. Army (1866–1957)

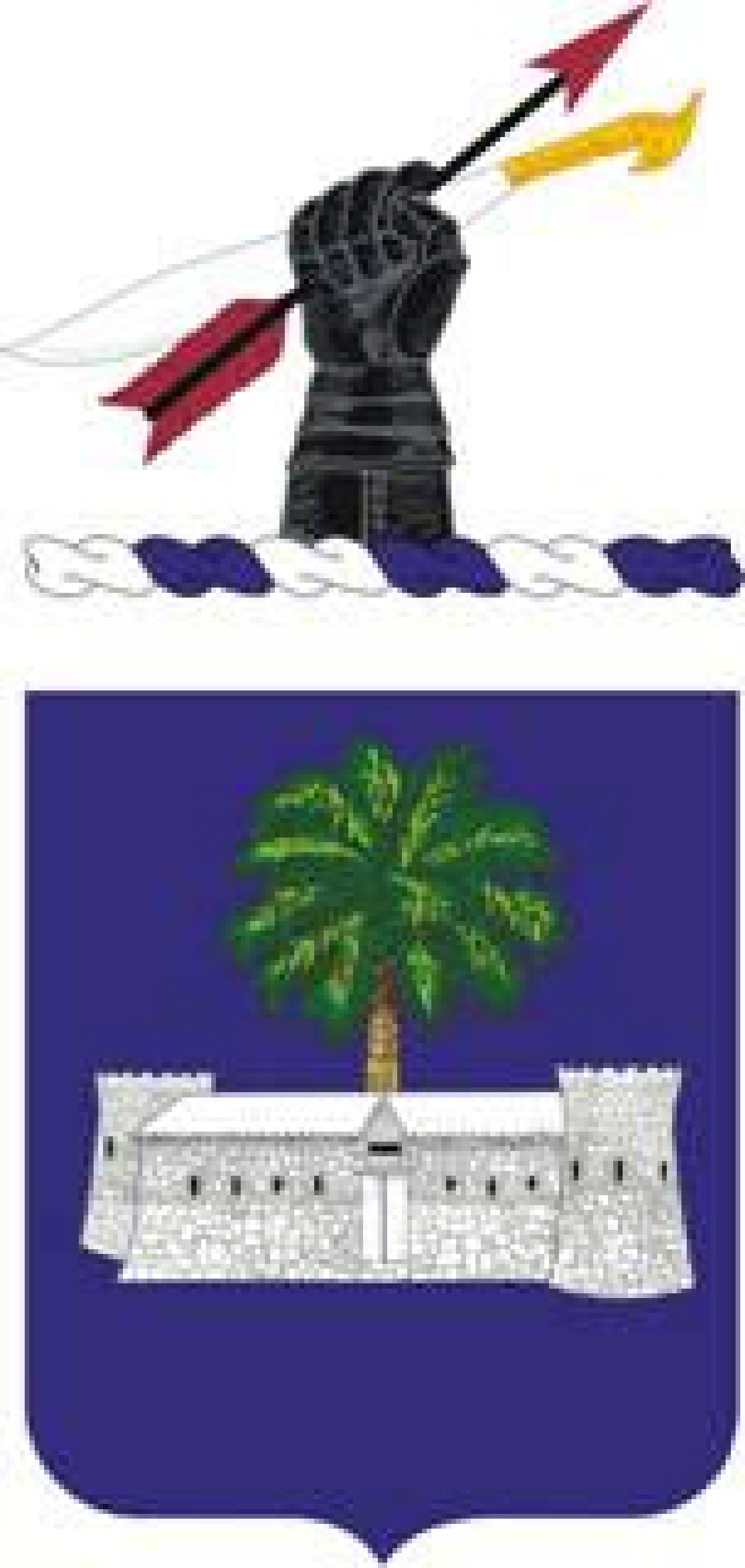
- Coat of arms of the 25th Infantry Regiment
- Active: 1866–1957
- Country: United States of America
- Branch: United States Army
- Type: Infantry
- Size: Regiment
- Motto: "Onward"
- Colors: Blue for Infantry
- Engagements: Indian Wars; Spanish–American War; Siege of Santiago; Philippine–American War; World War II

Insignia
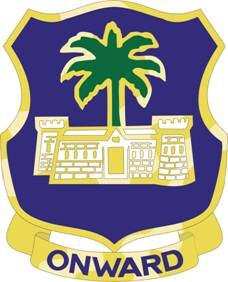
- Distinctive unit insignia

The 25th Infantry Regiment was an infantry regiment of the United States Army activated in 1866 and deactivated in 1957. One of the "Buffalo Soldier" units, the racially segregated regiment saw action during the American Indian Wars, Spanish–American War, Philippine–American War and World War II.

== Other units known as "25th Infantry Regiment" ==
There was a 25th Infantry Regiment, raised in 1812, that served on the Lake Champlain front and the Niagara Frontier in the War of 1812. In 1815, during a postwar reduction in force, it was consolidated with four other regiments to form the 6th Infantry Regiment.

Beginning in January 1864, the 25th United States Colored Infantry Regiment was recruited and trained at Camp William Penn near Philadelphia, Pennsylvania. This regiment mustered out of service on 6 December 1865.

On 28 July 1866 the 2nd Battalion, 18th Infantry, raised in 1861 for service in the American Civil War, was separated and designated the 25th Infantry Regiment. In 1869, it was consolidated back into the 18th.

== History ==
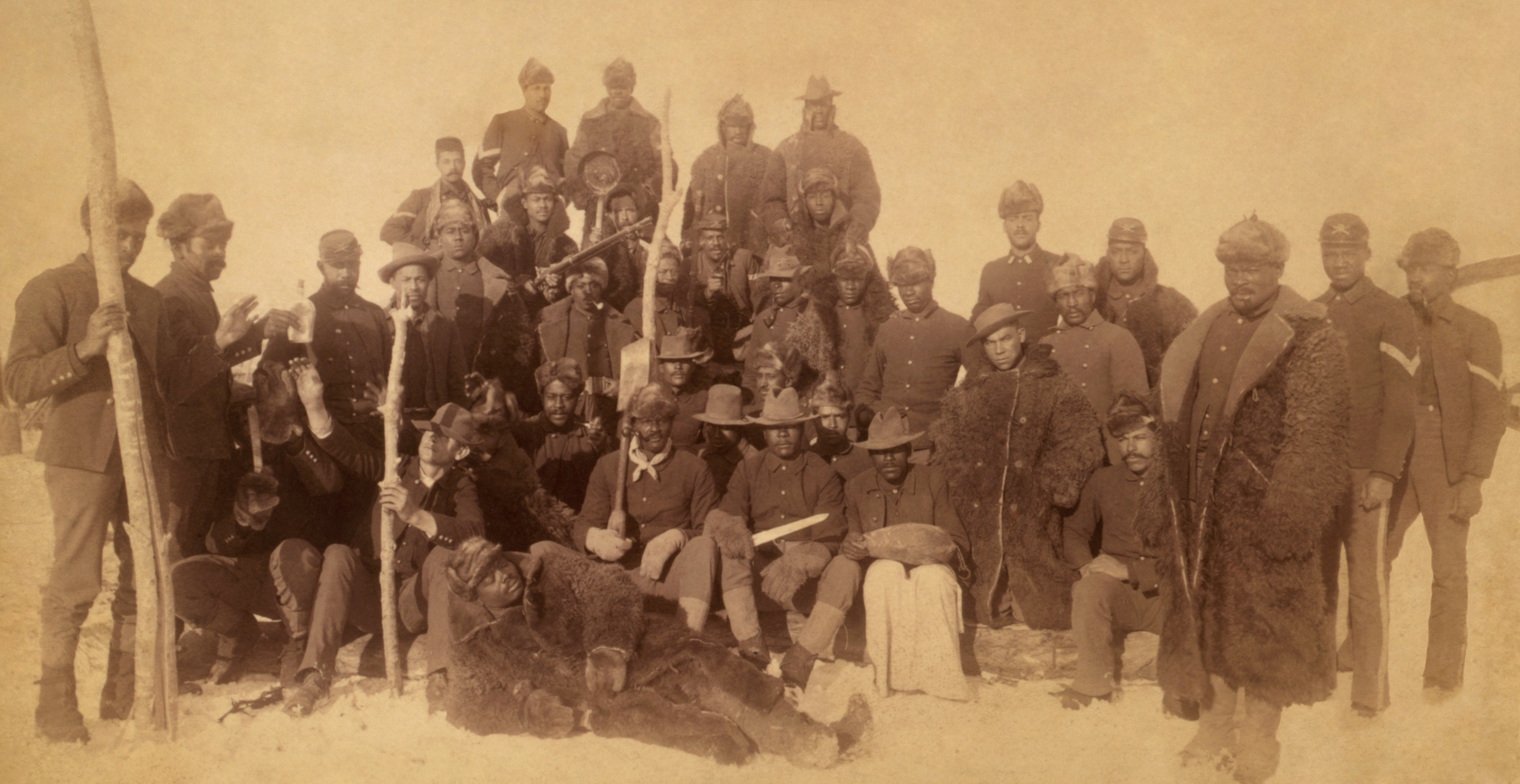
Soldiers of the 25th Infantry, Fort Keogh, Montana, 1890.

After the Civil War, the regular army was expanded to 45 infantry regiments from its wartime strength of 19. The act of Congress that authorized this included the creation of four regiments of "Colored Troops", racially segregated units with white officers and African American enlisted men. The army had raised a number of volunteer United States Colored Troops (USCT) regiments during the war. The new regiments were the 38th, 39th, 40th and 41st Infantry Regiments, and they set about recruiting mostly from USCT veterans. This was the first time that the Regular Army had non-white regiments as part of its organization. The U.S. Army continued to have racially segregated units until 1950.

By an act of 3 March 1869, Congress reduced the 45 regiments to 25, and the four colored regiments to two. The 39th and 40th Regiments were consolidated and renumbered as the 25th Infantry Regiment. In April the 25th established its first headquarters at Jackson Barracks, Louisiana, under command of Colonel Joseph A. Mower.

=== Indian Wars ===
In May 1870 the regiment was ordered to San Antonio, Texas. After a short period there, its companies were distributed across a number of small west Texas posts, including Forts Bliss, Clark, Davis, and Stockton. The 25th was posted along the Mexican border in Texas and New Mexico for the next ten years, providing border security, building roads and telegraph lines, and on occasion participating in operations against Indian bands. In 1878, a detachment entered Mexico on a punitive expedition.

In 1880 the 25th was transferred to the northern Great Plains, operating mostly in Dakota Territory, Montana and Minnesota. In Minnesota the 25th garrisoned at Fort Snelling. Elements of the 25th took part in the last major Indian campaign, the Pine Ridge Campaign of 1890–91.

Several companies of the 25th were deployed to break the Northern Pacific Railroad strike of 1894.

=== 25th Infantry Regiment Bicycle Corps ===
Following a promotion in 1895, General Nelson A. Miles expanded on an initiative involving the introduction of bicycle troops in the U.S. Army. The volunteer corps was led by Lieutenant James A. Moss and the 25th and the volunteer group tested the feasibility of the bicycles by completing long-distance trips. The first trip was a four-day, 126-mile trip to Lake McDonald, directly north of Fort Missoula. Carrying roughly 120 pounds of supplies and 50 pounds of ammunition, the cyclists endured rough roads, steep hills, muddy boots, and constant bicycle repairs. Despite the obstacles, the trip was named as a success and six days later they embarked on their next trip: a 325-mile trip to Fort Yellowstone. Travelling about 45 miles a day, the regiment arrived at Yellowstone after an 8-and-a-half-day trek. The men had to carry extra food and supplies for the trip, increasing the weight of the bicycles. Technical issues (mainly tires) continued to create problems for the soldiers, with tires constantly needing replaced due to damage and poor design. More technical issues were found during the trip back to Fort Missoula from Yellowstone, with the mud making the terrain very difficult to traverse.

After more training maneuvers and small-scale tests, the 25th completed a trip from Fort Missoula to St. Louis, Missouri. The 1,900-mile trip involved differing climates and altitudes as well as both wet and dry terrain, which each posed its own problems for the 25th. 20 men who met the Army's physical specifications were joined by fort physician Dr. James M. Kennedy and journalist Edward Boos of The Daily Missoulian for the trip. They set off for St. Louis on 14 June 1897. The group suffered from thirst, hunger, and the ill effects of alkali water, cold, heat, and loss of sleep. Shifting from the snow and sleet of the Rocky Mountains to the warm temperatures of the lower elevations proved to be a challenge for the corps. The contaminated water made several members ill, including Lt. Moss, who had to catch up to the group by train once they recovered. Mud and poor road conditions slowed the group down as well, causing their rations to run out ahead of schedule. The bicycles could not ride through the mud, so the men often carried them when attempting to traverse mud. Lt. Moss estimated that the corps had to dismount every seven miles due to road conditions. They did not reach their destination until 24 July. The group was greeted by celebration in St. Louis by locals and cyclists alike. After submitting his report, Moss petitioned for the group to ride to St. Paul, Minnesota, then continue back to Fort Missoula by train, but his request was denied, and the men traveled back by train from St. Louis.

On 7 February 1898, Lt. Moss requested another trip for the corps, this time from Fort Missoula to San Francisco. As the Spanish-American War broke out in April 1898, the 25th was reassigned to active duty in Cuba and all further tests were cancelled. Lt. Moss was reassigned to the 24th Infantry and petitioned for bicycles to be utilized in their campaign in Cuba. This was rejected by the U.S. Army, who would go on to use motorcycles and automobiles in future conflicts.

=== Spanish–American War ===
All four colored regiments were transferred to Florida in the spring of 1898 in preparation for the war with Spain. They were assigned to Major General William R. Shafter's V Corps, which moved to Cuba to capture the major eastern city, Santiago de Cuba.

The 25th participated in the 1 July 1898 assault on El Caney, commanded by Brigadier General Henry W. Lawton. Men from the 25th were among the first to reach the summit. Private T.C. Butler of H Company was first into the blockhouse at the summit, capturing the Spanish flag. An officer of the 12th Infantry ordered Butler to turn over the flag, and the 12th later claimed credit for the capture. Lieutenant Colonel A. S. Daggett, commanding the 25th, filed an official protest over the incident.

On 14 July, when the Spanish surrendered the city, the 25th had advanced closer to Santiago than any other unit.

=== Philippine–American War ===
In 1899 the 25th returned from Cuba to posts in the southern Rockies. Late in the year they shipped out to the Philippine Islands under the command of Colonel Andrew S. Burt to participate in operations against the Philippine nationalist movement of Emilio Aguinaldo. They returned to the U.S. in 1902.

=== Brownsville Affair ===
In 1906 a company of 167 soldiers of the 25th Infantry was dishonorably discharged without a trial on grounds of having shot at whites in Brownsville, Texas. In 1972 the accused were found to be innocent of the charges and the 1906 order was reversed.

=== The Forest Fires of 1910 ===
In the summer of 1910, the newly created United States Forest Service was fighting hundreds of fires across northern Idaho, Western Montana and eastern Washington. Drought conditions, high winds, high temperatures and lightning had created hundreds of forest fires. Dispatched by the Army to assist in the firefighting efforts, members of Company G, 25th Infantry Regiment, stationed at Fort George Wright in Spokane, Washington were sent to Avery, Idaho. Arriving on 17 August 1910, the soldiers worked on the fire threatening the town over the next four days. On 21 August the forest fire, pushed by strong winds and joining other fires, forced the evacuation of Avery, and the Soldiers of the 25th Infantry Regiment were instrumental in the safe evacuation of hundreds of townsfolk. By the time the fire ended a few days later, over three million acres had been burned. After the fire the soldiers assisted with the cleanup and in the search and recovery of the many that were killed during the fire.

In the PBS documentary titled "The Big Burn", historians credit the Buffalo Soldiers with saving the town of Avery by building a "back" fire that collided and then consumed the "front" fire until there was no fire. Their "wit" saved the town from utter destruction.

=== World War I ===
During World War I, the 25th was assigned to garrison duty at Schofield Barracks in Hawaii and did not see combat.

=== Interwar period ===
The 25th Infantry was stationed at Camp Stephen D. Little, Arizona, as of June 1919 as a separate regiment. The 2nd Battalion was transferred in July 1922 from Camp Shannon, Hachita, New Mexico, to Camp Furlong, New Mexico. The 1st Battalion was transferred in 1926 to Camp Harry J. Jones, Arizona. The 3rd Battalion was transferred in March 1928 to Fort Huachuca, Arizona. The regiment deployed on 12 March 1929 to Naco, Arizona, to conduct border patrols as a result of the Escobar–Topete Revolution, and remained on border patrols until 10 May 1929. The 1st Battalion was transferred from Camp Harry J. Jones to Fort Huachuca and was inactivated there on 6 January 1933. Concurrently, the 2nd Battalion was transferred from Camp Stephen D. Little to Fort Huachuca. In April 1933, the regiment assumed command and control of the Arizona Civilian Conservation Corps District. The regimental headquarters was transferred in December 1933 to Fort Huachuca. First Sergeant William McCauley, the last active duty member of the regiment who participated in the charge at El Caney, Cuba, on 1 July 1898, retired at Fort Huachuca in April 1934.

=== World War II ===
In World War II the 25th Infantry Regiment (Colored) was an organic element of the 93rd Infantry Division (Colored) and served in the Pacific Theater of Operations. The regiment departed San Francisco on 24 January 1944 and arrived on Guadalcanal in echelons between 7 February and 5 March 1944. From there the regiment was transferred to Bougainville and attached to the Americal Division to take part in offensive operations against Japanese forces on that island in April and May of the same year. From 26 May to 21 June the regiment was stationed on the Green Islands where it received further training and was employed for the construction of defensive fortifications and installations. From 10 November 1944 to 30 March 1945 the 25th Infantry Regiment was involved as defense regiment around Finschafen New Guinea. The regiment's final transfer during World War II was to Morotai Island where it arrived by 12 April 1945 where it once again participated in offensive operations until the end of the war. For World War II the 25th Infantry Regiment (Colored) received campaign credit for the Northern Solomons, Bismarck Archipelago and New Guinea. The regiment was inactivated at Camp Stoneman, California on 3 February 1946, and relieved from assignment to the 93d Infantry Division on 5 February 1946. Within a few years, the entire U.S. military was ordered desegregated by President Harry Truman, ending all segregation in the American armed forces.

=== Post World War II ===
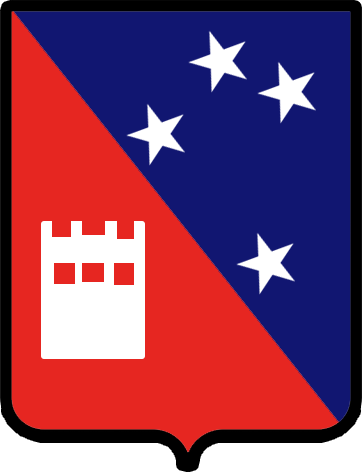
25th Regimental Combat Team SSI 1946-1947

Right after the 25th Infantry Regiment was inactivated in February 1946 at Camp Stoneman, California, it was brought back to life during the period February–May 1946 at Fort Benning, Georgia. But first, the 107th Regimental Combat Team (RCT) (Colored) is worth mentioning and is part of this story. First Army activated the 107th RCT at Fort Benning, Georgia on 21 February 1946. Built around the 107th Infantry Regiment, it was activated with all the required supporting forces: the 571st Field Artillery Battalion (105mm Howitzer, Truck Drawn); 22d Medium Tank Company; 973d Engineer Combat Company; and the 375th Medical Collecting Company. The 107th had recently been assigned the 196th Army Ground Forces Band (Colored) from Camp Shelby, Mississippi. The 107th RCT had an assigned strength of 139 officers, 7 warrant officers, and 2,662 enlisted men. Officer personnel were white and colored while enlisted personnel were all colored. The 107th RCT history would be short-lived. On 21 March 1946, the 107th would be reflagged as the 25th Regimental Combat Team (Colored) assigned to Fourth Headquarters, First Army and would inherit all the units of the 107th RCT minus the 107th Infantry Regiment. The first commander of the 25th RCT was Colonel (later BG) Robert L. Dulaney a veteran of WWII in Europe.

On 6 April, the regiment was selected to march in the Army Day parade down Constitution Avenue in Washington, D.C. representing all veterans from WWI and WWII. On 18 April 1946, the entire 25th RCT moved to the Sand Hill area of Fort Benning. In May 1946, the 25th RCT activated its 3d Battalion which had been unfilled since 21 March 1946. With the new 3d battalion now part of the 25th RCT, personnel would increase by 139 officers, 5 warrant officers, and 2810 enlisted personnel for a 25th RCT total of approximately 4,000 soldiers. In early November 1946, the 25th RCT regimental colors were returned to the unit in a ceremony at the 25th RCT parade grounds at the Sand Hill area. Also in November 1946, the 25th RCT established a new two-year educational program geared towards enlisted soldiers lacking education below the 8th grade. As part of their training, the program was designed to raise to an 8th grade level those students that fell into the educational sub-par brackets of IV and V on the Army General Classification Test. Some 1,900 25th RCT students began the program in early November 1946 at Fort Benning, Georgia.

=== Cold War ===
Now that the 25th RCT had been brought up to full personnel strength, it would soon be supporting its old friend the 24th Infantry Regiment (Colored). The 24th was now on occupation duty in the Far East. The Army was going to try an experiment of integrating the entire 24th Infantry Regiment (Colored) into the white 25th Infantry Division also on occupation duty in Japan. This would leave the 27th and 35th Infantry Regiments in the division. The 4th Infantry Regiment was pulled out of the division and returned to the states. To bring the 24th Infantry Regiment up to full strength, the War Department approved transferring soldiers from the 25th Infantry Regiment to the 24th Infantry Regiment on very short notice. Over 20 officers and 515 soldiers from the 25th Infantry Regiment at Fort Benning were intensively trained for this assignment. This contingent of soldiers left Fort Benning, Georgia, on 5 February 1947, under the command of Capt. Raymond A. Diggs on their first leg of a long-distance journey by ship to Japan. These soldiers arrived in Japan in late February 1947.

In a ceremony at the Sand Hill parade grounds early in March 1947, the 25th Infantry Regiment received its three WWII Asiatic-Pacific campaign streamers for New Guinea, Northern Solomons, and Bismarck Archipelago. In a major reorganization of the 25th RCT, the regimental combat team organization was no more on 15 February 1947. The 25th Infantry Regiment organization would remain along with the same supporting units with the addition of the 999th Field Artillery Battalion. The number of 25th Infantry rifle battalions would drop from three to two. The First Battalion was designated to furnish personnel for the Air Indoctrination Course that was to be conducted at Lawson Field, Fort Benning. The Second Battalion was attached to the 325th Airborne Infantry Regiment and acting as demonstration troops for the Infantry School at Fort Benning and working problems for students. The 25th would celebrate its 78th anniversary the week of 4 May 1947, during "Organization Day" at Fort Benning. It had been organized on 20 April 1869, by an Act of Congress. The 25th Infantry Regiment had fought in four wars in its 78-year history. The regiment had participated in the Indian Wars, the War with Spain, the Philippine Insurrection, and World War II. In July 1947, the 25th Infantry Regiment would lose one of its units, the 571st Field Artillery Battalion. It was being transferred to Fort Riley, Kansas, to the Army's Field Artillery Center where it would serve as a "School Troops" unit for Artillery Officer Candidate classes at Riley. The 571st performed similar functions while assigned to Fort Benning.

== Campaigns ==
- Indian Wars 1869–1890
- Spanish–American War
- Philippine–American War
- World War II

== Notable soldiers and officers ==
- Carroll Augustine Devol (1859–1930), quartermaster.
- Lewis Broadus (1897–1917)
- Gilbert W. Lindsay (1900–1990), Los Angeles City Council member, 1963–1990
- Dobie Moore, A Company, 1916–1920
- Clarence Leonard Tinker (1887–1942).
- Bullet Rogan
- Prince Romerson (c. 1840–1872), a Native Hawaiian soldier from the Kingdom of Hawaii who also fought in the Civil War.
