= Buffalo Soldier Monument =

Statue in West Point, New York, U.S.

Coordinates: 41°22′44″N 73°57′48″W

- Interactive map of Buffalo Soldier Monument
- Location: United States Military Academy, West Point, New York
- Designer: Eddie Dixon
- Dedicated date: 2021

The Buffalo Soldier Monument by American sculptor Eddie Dixon was installed at the United States Military Academy in West Point, New York, in 2021.
