= Charles M. Bussey =

World War II and Korean War officer, U.S. Army

- Born: April 23, 1921; Bakersfield, California
- Died: October 26, 2003 (aged 82); Las Vegas, Nevada
- Burial place: Daly City, California
- Education: San Francisco State University, Political science (Bachelor's degree)
- Military career
- Allegiance: United States
- Branch: United States Army; United States Army Corps of Engineers; United States Army Aviation Branch
- Service years: 1941–1945; 1948–1966
- Rank: Lieutenant colonel
- Units: 332d Fighter Group, World War II; 74th Engineer Battalion
- Commands: 77th Engineer Combat Company, attached to 24th Infantry Regiment, Korea; 521st Engineer Company, attached to 30th Engineer Group
- Conflicts: World War II; Udine, June 9, 1944; Korean War; Battle of Yechon; Battle of the Pusan Perimeter
- Awards: Air Medal; Oak leaf cluster (3); Silver Star; Purple Heart (2); Bronze Star Medal with "V" device; Legion of Merit
- Other work: Co-founder and President, Patimik Corporation; President, San Francisco Container Corporation; Author, Firefight at Yechon

Charles M. Bussey (April 23, 1921 – October 26, 2003) was a decorated soldier in the U.S. military who served with the Tuskegee Airmen in World War II, and with the Army Corps of Engineers in the Korean War. Bussey was awarded an Air Medal for service in World War II, as well as the Bronze Star Medal with "V" device, the Silver Star and two Purple Hearts (Note: The first Purple Heart was for wounds suffered while preventing the NKPA from outflanking the 24th Infantry Regiment in capturing Yechon. The second was for wounds suffered while rescuing members of the 77th ECC from behind enemy lines at Haman.) for service in Korea. Bussey also received the Legion of Merit for service rendered in California in 1964. He retired as a Lieutenant Colonel in 1966.

== Early life ==
Bussey was born April 23, 1921, in Kern, California, and raised in Bakersfield, California. He attended Bakersfield High School and participated in the Citizens' Military Training Camp while he was a student there. After high school, he studied engineering at Los Angeles City College. Before joining the military, Bussey worked as a framebuilder at Vega Aircraft Corporation.

== Military service ==
=== World War II ===
Bussey joined the U.S. Army in September 1941, training as an aviation cadet at the Tuskegee Army Flying School, with unit training at Selfridge as a member of the 302nd 'Hellions'. He graduated with class 43-E. He served as a P-47 Thunderbolt pilot in the 332d Fighter Group, and was one of the five pilots who shot down ME-109s in the Udine area of Italy, June 9, 1944. He flew 115 missions before being rotated out to be an instructor at Tuskegee in the spring of 1945. He received an Air Medal with three oak leaf clusters for his actions, and was honorably discharged at the rank of First Lieutenant in the fall of 1945.

=== Interim ===
After World War II, Bussey enrolled in the Los Angeles Police Academy, graduating first in his class, and then worked as a Los Angeles police officer assigned to the Black ghetto. He joined the California National Guard in 1946. He attended both the University of Southern California and San Francisco State University, earning a Bachelor's degree in political science in 1949.

Bussey also purchased surplus training planes to run his own business flying signs and dropping leaflets before he re-enlisted in the U.S. Army in 1948, assigned to the 74th Engineer Battalion of the United States Army Corps of Engineers at Fort Campbell. In January 1950, he was transferred to Japan. On arrival, he was assigned to the 538th Engineer Service Battalion. Bussey commanded the 77th Engineer Combat Company from May 26, 1950. The 77th ECC left Japan for Korea on July 11.

=== Korean War ===
On July 20, 1950, then-First Lieutenant Bussey, alongside three truck drivers, (Note: As quoted from Secretary of Defense William Cohen from May 1998 in the Chronicle article.) set up two machine guns, a .30-caliber and a .50-caliber, and prevented the Korean People's Army from outflanking the 24th Infantry Regiment, killing 258 enemy soldiers while under mortar fire. Bussey received both a Silver Star and a Purple Heart for his actions at the Battle of Yechon, the first victory for U.S. troops in Korea.

During the Battle of the Pusan Perimeter, on August 6, 1950, seven men from the 77th ECC were seriously wounded and left for dead when a platoon withdrew from the front lines near Haman. Two of the men were able to leave the area despite being surrounded by enemy combatants. The remaining five bound their wounds before Private first class Edward Sanders set out to find aid; it took two days and nights for Sanders to locate the 77th ECC, where he reported the others' location to Bussey. On August 11, Bussey led a rescue party into enemy territory, administered emergency care, and led the entire group out from behind enemy lines. Bussey was awarded a Bronze Star Medal with the "V" device for his part in the action, as well as a second Purple Heart for wounds sustained while rescuing his men.

On August 15, 1950, Bussey received a field promotion to Captain for his actions in fighting near Chinju where he remained on the front lines for 22 hours.

Bussey's tour in Korea ended in January 1951, but he remained on active duty until April 1, 1951.

Bussey's actions at Yechon resulted in a recommendation that he receive the Medal of Honor, and his actions at Haman resulted in a recommendation for the Distinguished Service Cross. Bussey, his fellow officer David K. Carlisle, and, later, Congressman Augustus Hawkins believed racism to be the reason Bussey received the Silver Star and the Bronze Star Medal instead. Congressman Ronald Dellums chaired the United States House Committee on Armed Services in 1994, and suggested the matter be investigated.

=== Post war ===
Following his tour in Korea, Bussey went to the Army Flying School at Fort Rucker in 1952. He took command of the 521st Engineer Company, stationed in Stockton, California and attached to the 30th Engineer Group, in December 1956.

On July 19, 1965, Bussey received the Legion of Merit for aid provided during the Christmas flood of 1964 as the military liaison officer to Eureka, California's Office of Emergency Planning. Bussey retired from the army as a Lieutenant Colonel in 1966.

== After the military ==
In July 1967, Bussey co-founded Patimik Corporation, a Black-owned business in Hunter's Point, California. He was also the president of the San Francisco Container Corporation.

Bussey was appointed as a member of then-Governor Reagan's Task Force on Aerospace–Aviation Education, formed in 1969, on the committee for elementary and junior high schools.

He was employed by Bechtel on the Trans-Alaska Pipeline System and in Jubail. He also worked on constructing buildings in Riyadh, as well as going to Somalia to provide reports on U.S. involvement.

In 1989, Bussey and fellow retired officer Captain Carlisle spoke out against Neil Sheehan's depiction of the 24th Infantry Regiment's actions in Korea when Sheehan was awarded the Pulitzer Prize for A Bright Shining Lie. Carlisle and Bussey had been gathering records that directly contradicted the U.S. Army's official characterization of the 24th Infantry Regiment before Sheehan's book was published. In 1991, Bussey wrote Firefight at Yechon: courage and racism in the Korean War to depict "the life and times of fighting men."

== Personal life ==
He had several children.

== Death ==
Bussey died from complications due to diabetes and heart disease in Las Vegas, Nevada, October 26, 2003. He was buried in Daly City, California.
