= Battle of Sangju =

Battle of Sangju may refer to:

- Battle of Sangju (1592), one of the first battles in the Imjin War
- Battle of Sangju (1950), a battle in the Korean War
