= Firefight at Yechon =

Autobiography by Charles M. Bussey

Firefight at Yechon: Courage and Racism in the Korean War
- Author: Charles M. Bussey
- Language: English
- Subject: War History
- Genre: Non-fiction
- Publisher: Brassey's
- Publication date: 1991
- Publication place: United States
- Media type: Paperback
- Pages: 264
- ISBN: 0-0803-7448-4
- OCLC: 48399158
- Dewey Decimal: 951.904/23 21
- LC Class: DS921.6 .B87 2002

Firefight at Yechon: Courage and Racism in the Korean War, is an autobiography by Charles M. Bussey.

Bussey joined the Tuskegee Airmen, an all-black air unit, which protected Allied bombers on missions over Europe during World War II in over North Africa, Italy and finally Germany.

Bussey later served as an Army officer in the Korean war.

On July 20, 1950, Bussey was returning to his 77th Engineer Combat Company with mail from the states for one of his platoons, when he came across a dozen "lollygagagging" (resting) army truck drivers. Bussey heard fighting in the town ahead, in which Bassey states his company was supposed to provide back up support. He climbed a nearby hill. A kilometer to the rear of the vehicle column he spotted a large body of white-clad Koreans coming toward them.

Bussey ordered the drivers to unload the two machine guns and ammunition in their trucks and drag them to the top of the hill.

I watched the group of farmer-soldiers coming ever closer and reckoned that farmers scatter and run if you send a long burst of machine-gun fire over their heads, but soldiers flatten out like quail and await orders from their leader...I sent a burst from the .50 caliber machine gun dangerously close above the heads of the approaching group...True to the form of soldiers, they flattened into the paddy as the bullets flew past them...Bullets raked and chewed them up mercilessly...The advancing column was under tight observation from somewhere on the mountain because large mortar rounds started...overhead. I was knicked by a fragment. the gunner on the .30 caliber machine gunner was hit badly, and his assistant was killed. The enemy mortar was accurate. The shells were bursting about twenty to forty feet overhead, showering us with shell fragments. And we were now drawing small-arms fire from the rice paddies below...I chopped the North Korean troops to pieces...I was ashamed of the slaughter before me, but this was my job, my duty, and my responsibility. I stayed with it until not one white rag was left intact.

The enemy unit was destroyed. Bussey's group was given credit for killing 258 enemy soldiers in the battle. A day after United States forces occupied Yechon, an Associated Press reporter filed a story about the entire battle and said it was "the first sizable ground victory in the Korean war".

Bussey stated that he was denied the Medal of Honor in the battle because a racist white officer, Lt. Col. John T. Corley, felt the nation's highest medal for valor should only be awarded to a black man posthumously.

Thirty-nine years after the conflict, Bussey could not pinpoint the mass grave site of the dead North Korean soldiers and local civilians could not recall anything about the incident.

The Washington Post states that "prejudiced Army historians later insisted, against the evidence...[the Battle of Yechon]...never really happened".
