= Benjamin Brown (Medal of Honor) =

United States Army soldier, Medal of Honor recipient

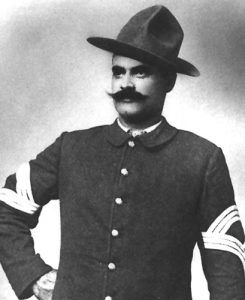
- Benjamin Brown in his Army Uniform
- Born: 1859; Spotsylvania County, Virginia, US
- Died: September 5 1910 (aged 50–51); Washington, D.C., US
- Burial place: United States Soldiers' and Airmen's Home National Cemetery Washington, D.C.
- Military career
- Allegiance: United States
- Branch: United States Army
- Service years: early 1880s-1905
- Rank: Sergeant
- Unit: 24th Infantry Regiment
- Conflicts: American Indian Wars
- Awards: Medal of Honor

Benjamin Brown (1859 – September 5, 1910) was a Buffalo Soldier in the United States Army and a recipient of America's highest military decoration—the Medal of Honor—for his actions during the Wham Paymaster Robbery in the Indian Wars of the western United States.

== Biography ==
Brown was born in Spotsylvania County, Virginia, in 1859.

He enlisted in the Army, and served in Companies C and H, as well as the Band, in the 24th Infantry Regiment. Over his career, Brown held the ranks of Private, Corporal, Sergeant, Drum Major and Sergeant Major. He served in several places in the American West, as well as in the Philippines.

On May 11, 1889, Brown was serving as a Sergeant in Company C of the 24th Infantry in the Arizona Territory when his unit was involved in an engagement with robbers during the Wham Paymaster Robbery. Major Joseph W. Wham was transporting a payroll consisting of more than US$28,000 in gold and silver coins from Fort Grant to Fort Thomas when he and his escort of eleven Buffalo Soldiers were ambushed. At the site of the ambush, the bandits had rolled a boulder across the road the Wham convoy was using to block it. Sergeant Brown led his men forward to try to move the boulder out of the road. The bandits opened fire on the convoy from positions on a slope above the road. The other soldiers then grabbed their weapons and ran for cover. Brown and two privates were separated from the other soldiers and forced down the road. Brown was wounded in his arm by the fire. After finding cover, Brown, though wounded, fired his revolver at the bandits. After emptying his revolver, he took a rifle from one of the privates and continued the fight. After one of the two privates was wounded, and Brown shot a second time, the three men retreated to a dry creek bed about 300 feet (91 m) away. After about an hour and a half of fighting, eight of the eleven soldiers were wounded, with Brown being wounded again in his other arm. The bandits then took the payroll and left the scene. After the battle, Brown and one other man were deemed too severely injured to move and were tended by one of the escort party until the surgeon from Fort Thomas could be dispatched to retrieve them.

For his actions during the engagement, Brown was awarded the Medal of Honor, a year later, on February 19, 1890. Corporal Isaiah Mays was also awarded the Medal of Honor for his actions that day while eight other soldiers received a Certificate of Merit. Eleven men, most from the nearby Mormon community of Pima, were arrested, with eight of them ultimately tried on charges of robbery. All of the accused were found not guilty, and the stolen money was never recovered.

Brown was an expert rifleman and was ranked fifty-fourth in the entire U.S. Army in 1904. He was forced to retire in 1904 after being disabled by a stroke.

Brown spent the rest of his life at the United States Soldiers' Home in Washington, D.C. He died in 1910 and was buried at the United States Soldiers' and Airmen's Home National Cemetery.

== Medal of Honor citation ==
Rank and organization: Sergeant, Company C, 24th U.S. Infantry. Place and date: Arizona, May 11, 1889. Entered service at: ------. Birth: Spotsylvania County, Va. Date of issue: February 19, 1890.

Citation:

Although shot in the abdomen, in a fight between a paymaster's escort and robbers, did not leave the field until again wounded through both arms.

== See also ==
- List of Medal of Honor recipients
- List of Medal of Honor recipients for the Indian Wars
- List of African American Medal of Honor recipients
