= Henry Blanchard Freeman =

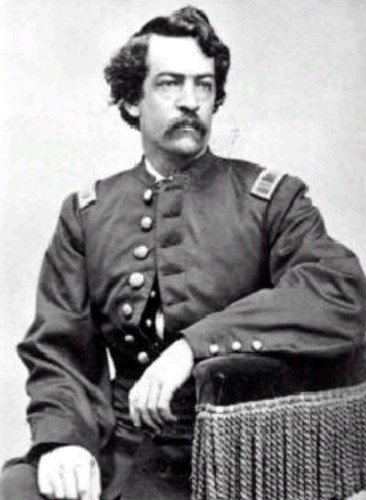
- Medal of Honor Winner Henr Blanchard Freeman
- Born: January 17, 1837; Mount Vernon, Ohio, US
- Died: October 16, 1915 (aged 78); Douglas, Wyoming, US
- Burial place: Arlington National Cemetery
- Military career
- Allegiance: United States
- Branch: United States Army (Union Army)
- Service years: 1855 - 1856, 1861 - 1901
- Rank: Brigadier General
- Unit: 18th Infantry Regiment
- Commands: 24th Infantry Regiment
- Conflicts: American Civil War: Stones River Campaign; Battle of Stones River; Chickamauga Campaign; Battle of Chickamauga
- Awards: Medal of Honor

Henry Blanchard Freeman (January 17, 1837 – October 16, 1915) was an American soldier who received the Medal of Honor for valor during the American Civil War.

== Biography ==
Henry Blanchard Freeman was born in Mount Vernon, Ohio and enlisted in the Army in 1856 at the age of 19. Within a few months of the outbreak of the American Civil War, he was commissioned as a 2nd Lieutenant of the 18th Infantry in October 1861. He served with the 18th Infantry throughout the Civil War.

He received the Medal of Honor on February 17, 1894, for his actions at the Battle of Stones River in December 1862. He was taken prisoner at the Battle of Chickamauga and was held at Libby Prison in Richmond, Virginia. He escaped from prison, was re-captured and again escaped.

He remained on active duty with the regular Army after the Civil War and served in campaigns against the Sioux tribe and in the Spanish-American War. He was promoted to colonel and became commander of the African-American 24th Infantry on October 4, 1898.

He was promoted to brigadier general on January 16, 1901 and was retired the next day, having reached the mandatory retirement age of 64.

General Freeman was a Companion of the Kansas Commandery of the Military Order of the Loyal Legion of the United States.

General Freeman is buried in Arlington National Cemetery.

== Awards ==
- Medal of Honor
- Civil War Campaign Medal
- Indian Campaign Medal
- Spanish War Service Medal
- Army of Cuban Occupation Medal
- Philippine Campaign Medal

=== Medal of Honor citation ===
Citation:

The President of the United States of America, in the name of Congress, takes pleasure in presenting the Medal of Honor to First Lieutenant (Infantry) Henry Blanchard Freeman, United States Army, for extraordinary heroism on 31 December 1862, while serving with 18th U.S. Infantry, in action at Stone River, Tennessee. First Lieutenant Freeman voluntarily went to the front and picked up and carried to a place of safety, under a heavy fire from the enemy, an acting field officer who had been wounded, and was about to fall into enemy hands.

== Legacy ==
A transport ship, the USS General H. B. Freeman (AP-143), was named in his honor.

== Dates of rank ==
- Private, Company G, 10th Infantry - 16 July 1855 to 5 February 1856
- Private and First Sergeant, Company B, 2nd Battalion, 15th Infantry - 8 July to 4 November 1861
- Second Lieutenant - 18th Infantry, 30 October 1861
- First Lieutenant - 30 May 1862
- Brevet Captain - 31 December 1862 for gallant and meritorious service in the Battle of Murfreesboro, Tennessee
- Brevet Major - 30 September 1863 for gallant and meritorious service in the battle of Chickamauga, Georgia
- Captain - 28 July 1866
- Transferred to 27th Infantry - 21 September 1866
- Unassigned - 14 June 1869
- Assigned to 7th Infantry - 7 January 1870
- Major, 16th Infantry - 19 June 1891
- Lieutenant Colonel, 5th Infantry - 30 January 1895
- Colonel, 24th Infantry - 4 October 1898
- Brigadier General - 16 January 1901
- Brigadier General, Retired - 17 January 1901

== See also ==
- List of American Civil War Medal of Honor recipients: A-F
