= Isaiah Mays =

United States Army soldier, Medal of Honor recipient

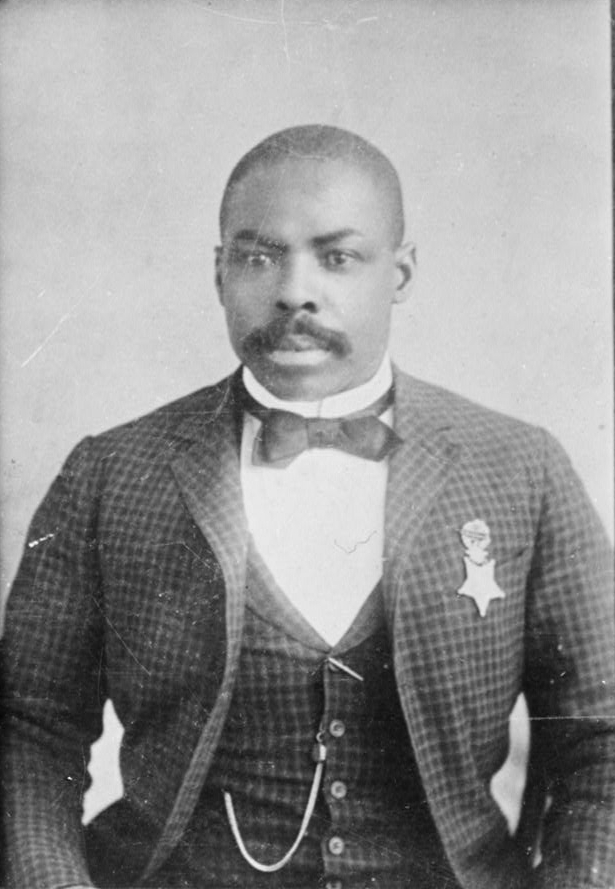
- Born: February 16, 1858; Carters Bridge, Virginia, U.S.
- Died: May 2, 1925 (aged 67); Phoenix, Arizona, U.S.
- Burial place: Arizona State Hospital Cemetery, Phoenix, Arizona; Arlington National Cemetery, Arlington, Virginia, U.S.
- Military career
- Allegiance: United States
- Branch: United States Army
- Service years: 1881 – 1893
- Rank: Corporal
- Unit: 24th Infantry Regiment
- Conflicts: American Indian Wars; Wham Paymaster Robbery
- Awards: Medal of Honor

Isaiah Mays (February 16, 1858 – May 2, 1925) was a Buffalo Soldier in the United States Army and a recipient of America's highest military decoration—the Medal of Honor—for his actions during the Wham Paymaster Robbery in Arizona Territory.

== Biography ==
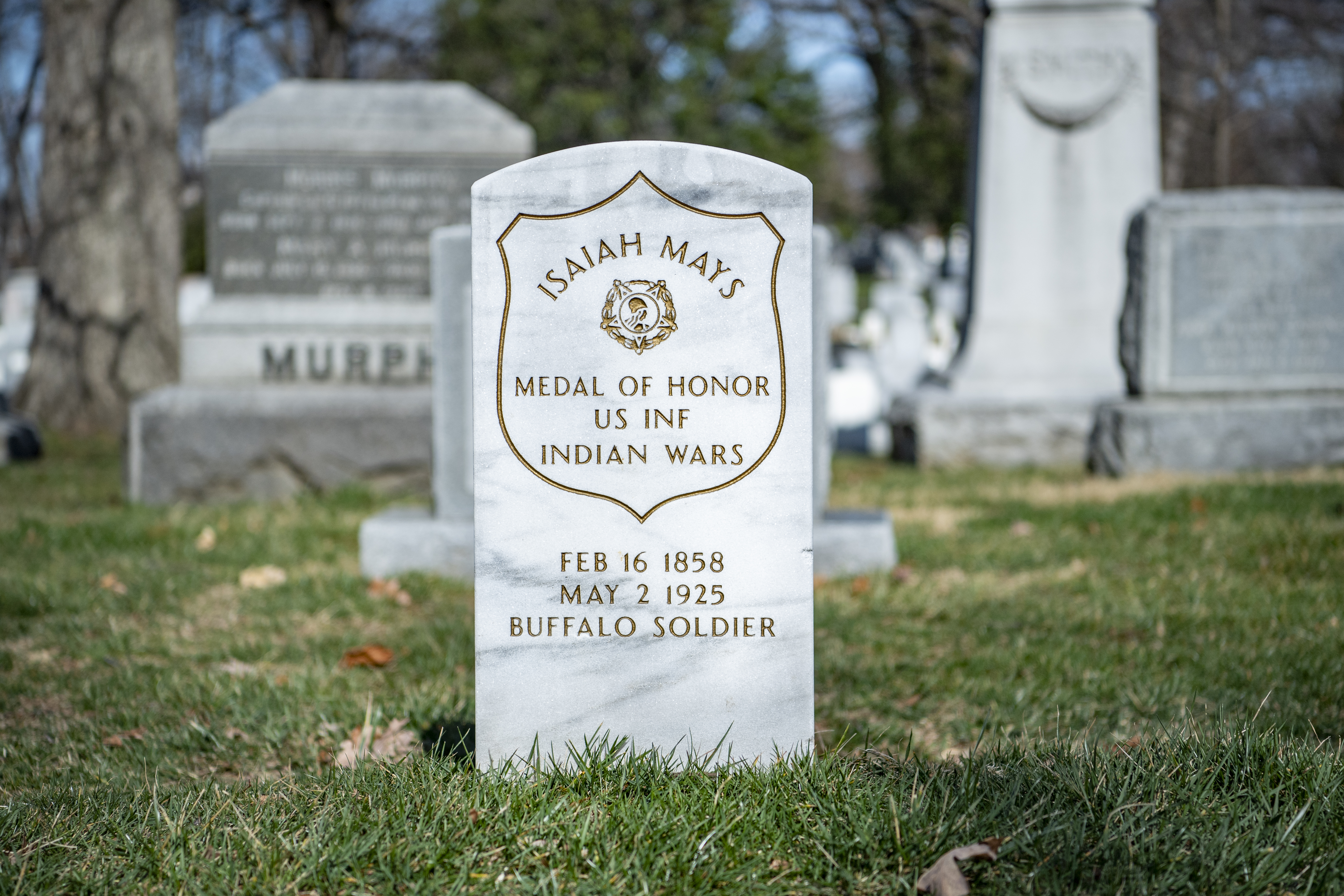
Grave at Arlington National Cemetery

Mays was born into slavery in Virginia. He joined the Army from Columbus Barracks, Ohio in September 1881. By May 11, 1889, he was serving as a corporal in Company B of the 24th Infantry Regiment in the Arizona Territory.

On that day, he was among the troops attacked during the Wham Paymaster Robbery. Major Joseph W. Wham was transporting a payroll consisting of more than US$28,000 in gold and silver coins from Fort Grant to Fort Thomas when he and his escort of eleven Buffalo Soldiers were ambushed. At the site of the ambush, the bandits had rolled a boulder across the road the Wham convoy was using to block it. After the convoy halted, Sergeant Benjamin Brown led his men forward to try to move the obstacle out of the road while Corporal Mays took a position at the rear of the convoy. The bandits then opened fire from a fortified position above the road. The soldiers grabbed their weapons and ran for cover. Mays initially returned fire with his revolver from behind the convoy’s escort wagon. This position soon proved untenable and he joined Wham who had taken cover behind a rocky ledge on the west side of the road. The bandits maneuvered along the top of the ridge to get the soldiers into a crossfire. About 30 minutes after the battle began, Mays, who had assumed command of the escort after Sergeant Brown had become separated from it, informed Wham that their position was no longer defensible and that he was ordering his men to withdraw. Wham initially objected to this choice but later admitted that Mays had made the correct military decision. From the rocky ledge, Wham and Mays withdrew to a nearby dry creek bed, about 300 yards (270 m) from their initial defensive position. There Wham attempted to rally the soldiers to retake the lock box holding the payroll, but realized that was not a viable option after seeing that eight of his eleven soldiers were wounded. The bandits continued to fire at the soldiers and ultimately descended the hill to open the lock box. After about an hour and a half altogether, the bandits departed and the battle was concluded.

The next year, on February 19, 1890, Mays was awarded the Medal of Honor for his actions during the engagement. Sergeant Brown was also awarded the Medal of Honor for his actions that day, while eight other soldiers received a Certificate of Merit. Eleven men, most from the nearby Mormon community of Pima, were arrested, with eight of them ultimately tried on charges of robbery. All of the accused were found not guilty, and the stolen money was never recovered.

After his discharge in September 1893, Mays worked as a laborer in Arizona and New Mexico. He applied for a federal pension in 1922, but was denied. He entered the Territorial Insane Asylum, now known as the Arizona State Hospital, in Phoenix, which housed not only the mentally ill but also people with tuberculosis and those living in poverty. He died at the hospital in 1925, at age sixty-seven, and was buried in the adjoining cemetery. His grave was marked with only a small stone block, etched with a number. In 2001, the marker was replaced with an official United States Department of Veterans Affairs headstone which stated his name, service history, and his status as a Medal of Honor recipient. Eight years later, in March 2009 under the care of the Old Guard Riders Inc., Cpl Mays' remains were disinterred, cremated and placed in an urn designed especially for him. On 29 May 2009, in a ceremony befitting a Medal of Honor recipient, Mays was interred in Arlington National Cemetery.

== Medal of Honor citation ==
Rank and organization: Corporal, Company B, 24th U.S. Infantry. Place and date: Arizona, 11 May 1889. Entered service at: Columbus Barracks, Ohio. Born: 16 February 1858, Carters Bridge, Va. Date of issue: 19 February 1890.

Citation:

Gallantry in the fight between Paymaster Wham's escort and robbers. Mays walked and crawled 2 miles to a ranch for help.

== See also ==
- List of Medal of Honor recipients for the Indian Wars
- List of African-American Medal of Honor recipients
