= USS General H. B. Freeman =

Ship built in 1945

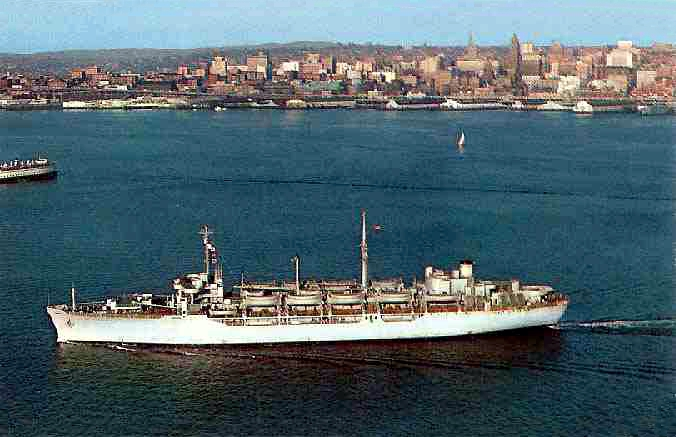
- USNS General H. B. Freeman in the 1950s

History

United States
- Name: General H. B. Freeman
- Namesake: Henry Blanchard Freeman
- Builder: Kaiser Co., Inc.; Richmond, California
- Laid down: date unknown
- Launched: 11 December 1944
- Acquired: 26 April 1945
- Commissioned: 26 April 1945
- Decommissioned: 4 March 1946
- In service: after 4 March 1946 (Army); 1 March 1950 (MSTS)
- Out of service: 1 March 1950 (Army); 24 July 1958 (MSTS)
- Reclassified: T-AP-143, 1 March 1950
- Stricken: 24 July 1958
- Identification: IMO number: 6903199
- Fate: Scrapped

General characteristics
- Class & type: General G. O. Squier-class transport ship
- Displacement: 9,950 tons (light), 17,250 tons (full)
- Length: 522 ft 10 in (159.36 m)
- Beam: 71 ft 6 in (21.79 m)
- Draft: 24 ft (7.32 m)
- Propulsion: single-screw steam turbine with 9,900 shp (7,400 kW)
- Speed: 17 knots (31 km/h)
- Capacity: 3,823 troops
- Complement: 356 (officers and enlisted)
- Armament: 4 × 5"/38 caliber gun mounts; 4 × 40 mm AA gun mounts; 16 × 20 mm AA gun mounts

USS General H. B. Freeman (AP-143) was a General G. O. Squier-class transport ship for the U.S. Navy in World War II. The ship was crewed by the U.S. Coast Guard until decommissioning. She was named in honor of U.S. Army general Henry Blanchard Freeman. She was transferred to the U.S. Army as USAT General H. B. Freeman in 1946. On 1 March 1950 she was transferred to the Military Sea Transportation Service (MSTS) as USNS General H. B. Freeman (T-AP-143). She was sold for commercial operation in 1965, and eventually scrapped.

== Operational history ==
General H. B. Freeman (AP-143) was launched 11 December 1944 under a Maritime Commission contract (MC #710) by the Kaiser Co., Inc., Yard 3, Richmond, California; sponsored by Mrs. Marie Wheeler; converted in the Kaiser yard at Vancouver, Washington; acquired by the Navy 26 April 1945; and commissioned at Portland, Oregon, the same day.

After shakedown operations out of San Diego, General H. B. Freeman departed San Pedro 1 June 1945 with 3,040 troops and passengers for Calcutta, India, where she arrived 9 July with 16 additional passengers, British Royal Marines who had embarked at Brisbane, Australia. On 13 July she was underway with more than 3,000 military passengers; embarking and debarking in Ceylon, Australia, New Guinea, and the Philippines before arriving Hagushi, Okinawa, 16 August 1945, the day after hostilities ended.

More than 1,000 homeward-bound veterans boarded the transport which departed Okinawa 21 August 1945 headed via Saipan and Pearl Harbor for the West Coast, arriving San Pedro, California, 12 September 1945. She sailed 7 October, carrying occupation troops to Tokyo, and returned to Seattle, Washington, 5 November as the "Magic-Carpet" home for more than 3,000 fighting men from the Pacific War. General H. B. Freeman made a similar passenger run from Seattle to Yokohama and back (16 November – 16 December 1945).

She next entered the Puget Sound Naval Shipyard, Bremerton, Washington, for inactivation overhaul and decommissioned there 4 March 1946. She was redelivered to the Maritime Commission for service with the Army's peacetime transport fleet.

General H. B. Freeman was reacquired by the Navy 1 March 1950 and assigned to MSTS. Crewed by the civil service, General H. B. Freeman carried military passengers throughout the Korean War from the West Coast to Korea, Japan, and island bases in the Pacific.

She was in the fleet that evacuated Hŭngnam. Her distinguished service won her the "Smart Ship Award" for three consecutive years (1950, 1951, and 1952). The transport continued to operate throughout the Pacific until 24 July 1958 when her name was again struck from the Navy List. She was returned to the Maritime Commission and to the National Defense Reserve Fleet Olympia, Washington, where she remained until sold for commercial service in 1967 under the MARAD Ship Exchange Program.

The ship was rebuilt in 1968 by Todd Shipyards, Galveston, TX as the container ship SS Newark, USCG ON 511486, IMO 6903199, for Sea Land Service. She was sold for scrapping in Taiwan in 1986.

== Sources ==
- Cudahy, Brian J. (2006). Box Boats: How Container Ships Changed the World. Fordham University Press. ISBN 978-0-8232-2569-9.
- Williams, Greg H. (2013). World War II U.S. Navy Vessels in Private Hands. McFarland Books. ISBN 978-0-7864-6645-0.
