= Battle of Sangju (1950) =

Engagement between the United Nations and North Korean forces

Coordinates: 36°26′23″N 128°10′11″E

- Part of Korean War
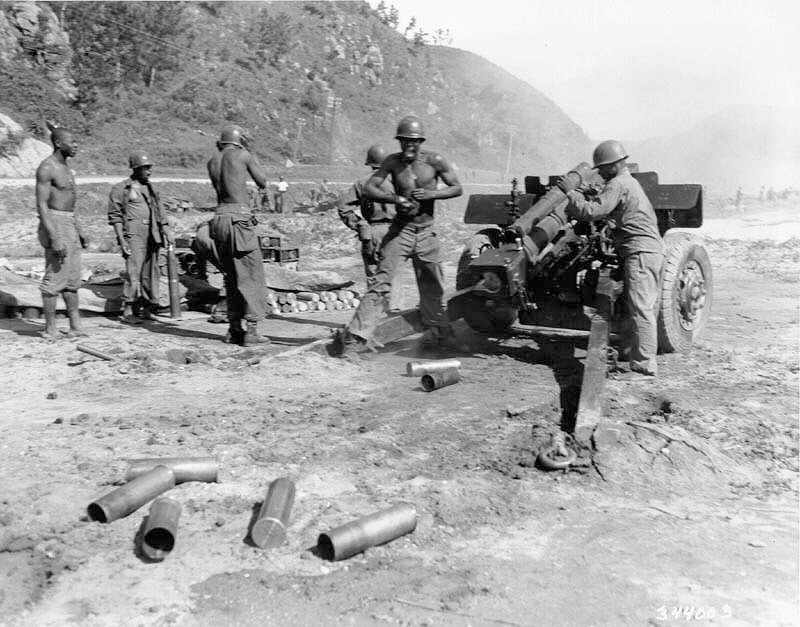
- Artillery in support of the US 24th Infantry fire from Yongdok, July 22.
Date	July 20–31, 1950
Location	Sangju, South Korea
Result	North Korean victory

Belligerents
United Nations: United States; South Korea	North Korea

Commanders and leaders
(United States) William B. Kean (First Republic of Korea) Paik Sun Yup	(North Korea) Pak Song-chol

Units involved
(United States) 25th Infantry Division (First Republic of Korea) 1st Infantry Division	(North Korea) 15th Infantry Division

Strength
US: 13,059; South Korea: 5,727	7,500

Casualties and losses
(United States) 27 killed, 293 wounded, 3 missing (First Republic of Korea) ~2,500 killed, wounded and missing	~2,500 casualties 17 T-34 tanks

The Battle of Sangju (Korean: 상주 전투) was an engagement between the United Nations and North Korean forces, occurring on July 20–31, 1950, in the village of Sangju in southern South Korea, early in the Korean War. It ended in a victory for the North Korean forces after they were able to push troops of the United States and South Korea out of the area.

Republic of Korea Army (ROK) units had been unsuccessfully resisting advances by the North Korean Korean People's Army (KPA) in the region when they were reinforced by the United States Army's 25th Infantry Division, newly arrived in the country. In the subsequent fight, the 25th Infantry Division was able to inflict substantial casualties on the advancing KPA 15th Infantry Division but was not able to hold its positions. In 11 days of fighting, the UN forces performed poorly and were forced to withdraw from Yechon County, the city of Sangju, and the surrounding areas.

The 24th Infantry Regiment of the 25th Division was ineffective in its first showing. The regiment, composed mostly of African-American troops, was criticized by the Army for being quick to panic and retreat. Some historians have described the Army's statements as biased, downplaying the regiment's successes and overstating its failures.

== Background ==
=== Outbreak of war ===
Following the invasion of the South Korea by North Korea, the United Nations decided to commit troops to the conflict in support of South Korea. The United States subsequently sent ground forces to the Korean peninsula with the goal of fighting back the North Korean invasion and to prevent South Korea from collapsing. However, US forces in the Far East had been steadily decreasing since the end of World War II in 1945, and at the time the closest forces were the 24th Infantry Division of the Eighth United States Army, which was headquartered in Japan. The division was understrength, and most of its equipment was antiquated due to reductions in military spending. Regardless, the 24th Infantry Division was ordered into South Korea.

The 24th Infantry Division was the first US unit sent into Korea with the mission to take the initial "shock" of North Korean advances, fighting alone and outnumbered for several weeks They delayed much larger KPA units while additional UN forces arrived and moved into position: the 7th Infantry Division, 25th Infantry Division, 1st Cavalry Division and other Eighth Army supporting units. ROK forces in the meantime were systematically defeated and forced south along Korea's east coast, with entire divisions being overrun by the KPA's superior firepower and equipment. Advance elements of the 24th Infantry Division were badly defeated in the Battle of Osan on July 5, during the first battle between American and North Korean forces. For the first month after the defeat at Osan, 24th Infantry Division soldiers were repeatedly defeated and forced south by the KPA's superior numbers and equipment. The regiments of the 24th Infantry Division were systematically pushed south in battles around Chochiwon, Chonan, and Pyongtaek. The 24th Infantry Division made a final stand in the Battle of Taejon, being almost completely destroyed but delaying KPA forces from advancing until July 20. By that time, the Eighth Army's force of combat troops were roughly equal to North Korean forces attacking the region at around 70,000 for each side, with new UN units arriving every day.

=== US 25th Infantry Division arrives ===
At the same time, on the east coast, the KPA 12th Division was resting from its heavy battles north of the town of Sangju, a crossroads center for all the mountain roads in that part of Korea. Situated south of the Mun'gyong plateau and the dividing watershed between the Han River and the Naktong River, Sangju had a commanding position in the valley of the Naktong, 45 miles (72 km) northeast of Taegu. There was a large amount of confused activity around Sangju during the end of July, as refugees and stragglers from the defeated ROK poured south through the town. Many ROK units were retreating to Sangju and some had passed south through it. Isolated fighting had already begun between KPA and ROK forces for control of the Mun'gyong plateau when the 25th Infantry Division under Major General William B. Kean, newly arrived in Korea on July 10–15, received orders from Eighth Army Commander Lieutenant General Walton Walker to concentrate there to bolster ROK defenses of the central mountain corridors. General Walker looked to the 25th Division to help the ROK forces in central Korea prevent a major KPA movement into the valley of the upper Naktong. The division stood at a strength of 13,059 as of July 19.

== Battle ==
=== Capture of Yechon ===
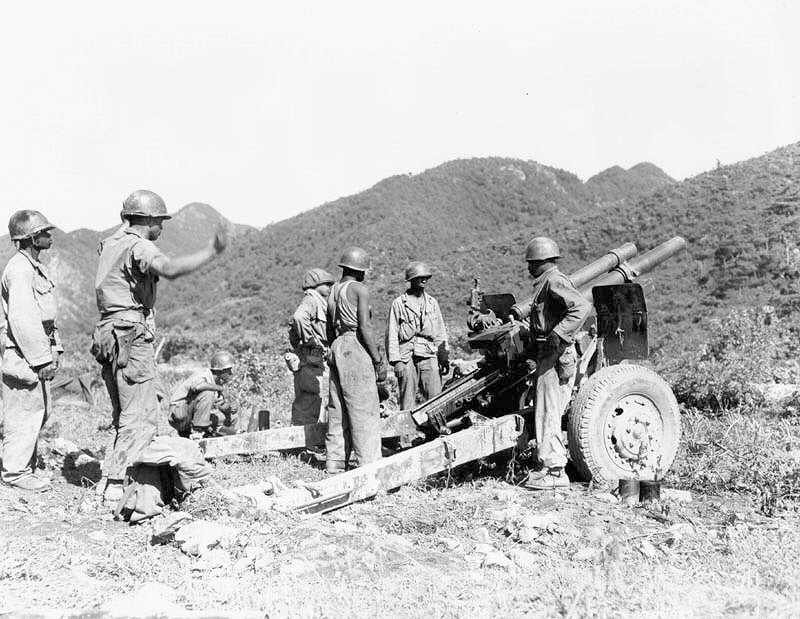
US artillery fires on North Korean targets.

The first action between elements of the 25th Division and the KPA took place at Yechon on July 20. Company K, 3rd Battalion, 24th Infantry Regiment, led by First Lieutenant Jasper R. Johnson, entered the town during the afternoon. When other units of the 3rd Battalion failed to take a ridge overlooking the town on the left, he requested and received permission to withdraw from the town for the night.

Meeting at the battalion command post, the commanders of the US units planned a renewed assault for 05:00 the next morning. Artillery and mortars fired on the town ahead of the infantry advance, and soon the town was on fire from the shells. By this time, however, Yechon had likely been abandoned by the North Koreans. At Hamch'ang, Colonel Henry G. Fisher, commanding the 35th Infantry Regiment, received an erroneous message early that morning stating that the KPA had driven the 24th Infantry from Yechon. He immediately left for Yechon. He found the battalion commander about 5 miles (8.0 km) west of the town, but was dissatisfied with the information that he received from him. Fisher and a small party then drove on into Yechon, which was still burning. He encountered no North Korean troops or South Korean civilians. The 3rd Platoon, 77th Engineer Combat Company, attached to Company K, entered the town with the infantrymen and attempted to halt the spread of flames but were unable to do so because of high, shifting winds. The 24th Infantry then met light resistance from North Korean troops counterattacking the town, but drove them off, securing the town after several hours of fighting at a cost of 2 killed and 12 wounded. North Korean casualties at the fight could not be estimated. However, the US Army, preoccupied by the Battle of Taejon, took little notice and credited the victory to the South Koreans. News of the capture was picked up by the US media as the first fight won by black soldiers of the mostly black unit. By 13:00 Yechon was secured, and 3rd Battalion turned over control of the town to the ROK 18th Regiment of the Capital Division. The Capital Division then concentrated the bulk of its forces there, and opposed the KPA 8th Division in that vicinity the remainder of the month.

=== Drawing battle lines ===
Major General Kean and his 25th Division had to guard two main approaches to Sangju to keep the town from falling to the North Koreans. The main road crossed the Mun'gyong plateau and passed through Hamch'ang at the base of the plateau about 15 miles (24 km) north of Sangju. Next, there was a secondary mountain road that crossed the plateau farther west and, once through the mountains, turned east toward Sangju.

On the main road, the 2nd Battalion, 35th Infantry, held a blocking position northwest of Hamch'ang, supported by a platoon of tanks from A Company, 78th Tank Battalion, and A Battery, 90th Field Artillery Battalion. The 1st Battalion was emplaced with the 2nd Battalion but stayed less than 24 hours before it was sent to reinforce the US 27th Infantry Regiment on the next north–south line of communications westward. Thus, in effect, one battalion of US troops stood behind ROK units on the Hamch'ang approach. On the second road, that leading into Sangju from the west, the 24th Infantry Regiment assembled two, and later all three, of its battalions.

The 2nd Battalion, 35th Infantry took up a hill position northwest of Hamch'ang and south of Mun'gyong on the south side of a stream that flowed past Sangju to the Naktong. On the north side of the stream an ROK battalion held the front line. Brigadier General Vennard Wilson, the 25th's Assistant Division Commander, ordered F Company of the battalion to be inserted in the center of the ROK line north of the stream, and this was done over the strong protests of the battalion commander, Lieutenant Colonel John L. Wilkins. Wilson thought the American troops would strengthen the ROK defense, but Wilkins did not want the untried company to be dependent on ROK stability in its first engagement. Behind the ROK and F Company positions the ground rose to another hill within small arms range. Heavy rains had swollen the stream behind the ROK and F Company positions to a torrent that was rolling large boulders along its channel. In the meantime, the ROK 2nd Battalion, 17th Regiment, ambushed a battalion of North Korean troops near Tongkwanri, forcing it to withdraw.

=== North Korean attack on Sangju ===
On July 22 the North Koreans attacked. The ROK troops resisted briefly, but withdrew from their positions on either side of F Company without communicating their intentions. The withdrawal had been a part of the plan for reorganizing the line to incorporate the US troops, but F Company expected them to send a message before doing so, and did not adjust their defenses to compensate. North Korean troops quickly flanked F Company and began attacking it from the rear. This precipitated an unorganized withdrawal. The swollen stream prevented F Company from crossing to the south side and the 2nd Battalion positions. Walking wounded crowded along the stream where an effort to get them across failed. Two officers and two noncommissioned officers tied a pair of twisted telephone wires about their bodies and tried to swim to the other bank and fasten a line, but each in turn was swept downstream where they floundered ashore on the same bank where they had started. Some men drowned trying to cross the swollen river. The covering fire of a platoon of tanks on the south side held off the North Koreans and allowed most of the survivors to eventually escape. F Company lost 37 men: 6 killed, 10 wounded, and 21 missing.

The next morning five North Korean T-34 tanks crossed the river and moved toward Hamch'ang. Artillery fire from A Battery of the 90th Field Artillery Battalion knocked out four of the tanks immediately. The fifth moved back across the river, where an air strike later destroyed it.

=== UN consolidates around Sangju ===
The 2nd Battalion, 35th Infantry, was still in its position when it received orders to withdraw to a point 5 miles (8.0 km) north of Sangju on July 23. On July 28 the battalion fell back 2 miles (3.2 km) further, and the next day it moved to a position south of Sangju. On the last day of July, the 35th Infantry was ordered to a blocking position on a line of hills 8 miles (13 km) south of Sangju on the Kumch'on road. In 11 days it had fallen back about 30 miles (48 km) on the Sangju front without encountering strong resistance, only North Korean patrols. During the battle, the 35th Infantry merely executed a series of withdrawals on division orders as the front around it collapsed, and was not heavily involved in the fighting.

The ROK 6th Division continued its hard-fought action on the road through the mountains from Mun'gyong, but gradually it fell back from in front of the KPA 1st Division. In the mountains above Hamch'ang the ROK 6th Division on July 24 destroyed seven North Korean T-34 tanks. Three days later the ROK 1st Division, now relieved northwest of Sangju by the US 24th Infantry and redeployed on the Hamch'ang front, destroyed four more tanks there with 2.36-inch bazookas and captured one tank intact. The remnants of the ROK 2nd Division, relieved by the 27th Infantry Regiment on the Hwanggan–Poun road, were incorporated into the ROK 1st Division. Thus, by July 24 the US 25th Division had taken over from the ROK 1st and 2nd Divisions the sector from Sangju westward to the Seoul–Taegu highway, and these ROK troops were moving into the line eastward and northward from Sangju on the Hamch'ang front.

By July 27 all the Mun'gyong divide was in North Korean possession and their units were moving into the valley of the upper Naktong in the vicinity of Hamch'ang. Prisoners taken at the time and others captured later said that the KPA 1st Division suffered 5,000 casualties in the struggle for control of the divide, including the division commander who was wounded and replaced. The KPA 13th Division, following the 1st, suffered about 500 casualties below Mun'gyong, but otherwise it was not engaged during this period. The KPA 15th Division, one of North Korea's weaker divisions which consisted mostly of inexperienced youth, moved on Sangju. It was part of a concentrated attack by the KPA aiming to push the UN forces south before they had time to organize an effective defensive line.

Simultaneously with their appearance on the Hamch'ang road at the southern base of the Mun'gyong plateau north of Sangju, the North Koreans approached on the secondary mountain road to the west. On July 22, F Company of the 35th Infantry was also attacked north of Hamch'ang, when it was confronted with a North Korean battalion three times its size. The company fought effectively and inflicted heavy casualties, though the next day rains caused flooding of a river to the unit's rear and cut off its route of supply. Assisted by artillery, it was able to disengage.

=== The 24th Infantry falters ===
Elements of the US 24th Infantry Regiment had a similar experience west of Sangju. On that day, the 2nd Battalion, 24th Infantry, and elements of the ROK 17th Regiment were advancing into the mountains 20 miles (32 km) northwest of the town. There, they came into contact with the KPA 48th Regiment, 15th Division, the leading element of the North Korean troops. With E Company leading, 2nd Battalion moved along the dirt road into a gorge with precipitous mountain walls. Suddenly, a North Korean light mortar and one or two automatic weapons fired on E Company. It stopped and the men dispersed along the sides of the road.

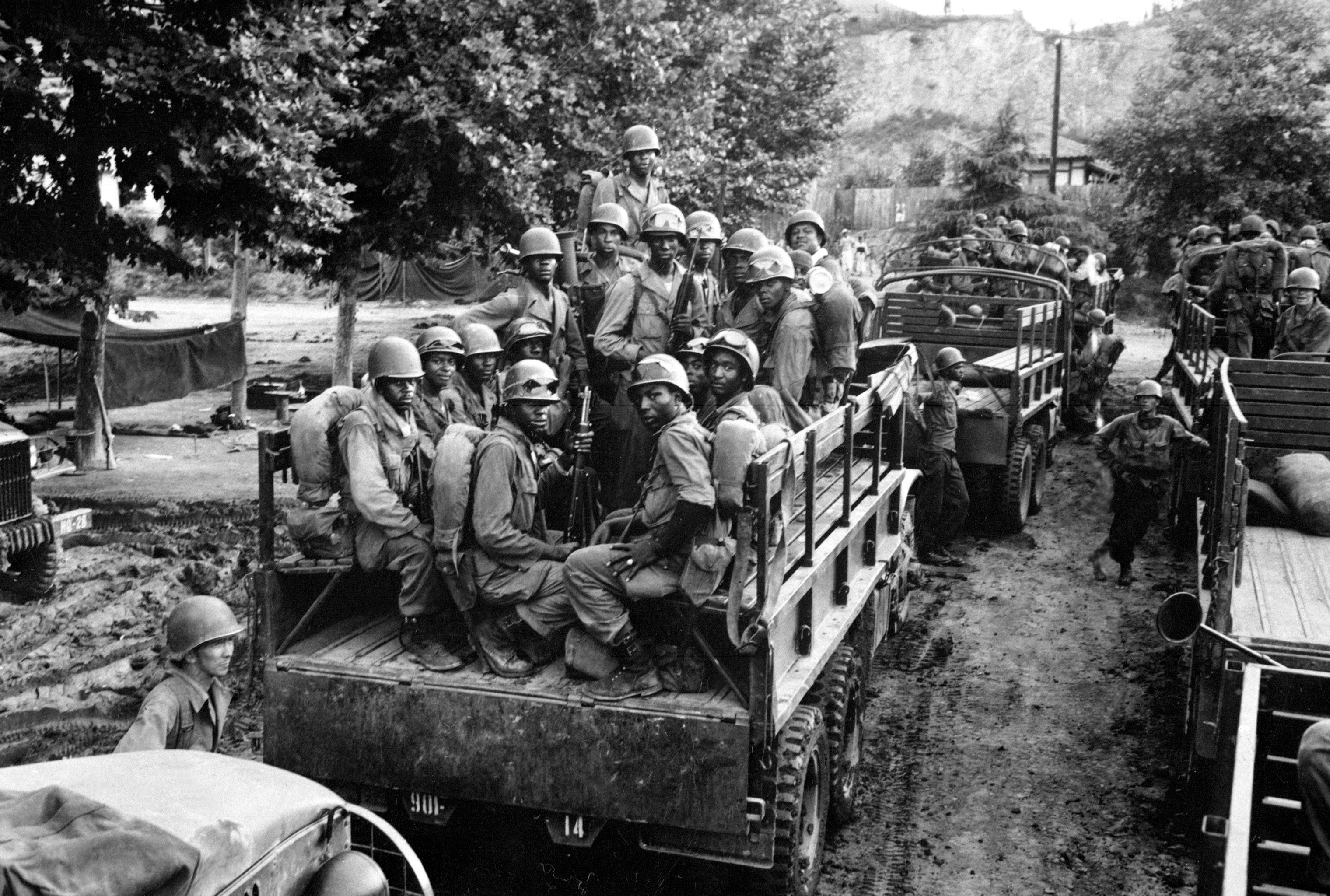
Troops of the 24th Infantry move to the Pusan Perimeter battleground.

Soon North Korean rifle fire came in on the dispersed men and E and F Companies immediately began withdrawing in a disorderly manner. Troops began shying from the front and retreating without orders, ignoring officers' commands to stay in position. Colonel Horton V. White, the regimental commander, heard of the difficulty and drove hurriedly to the scene. He found the battalion coming back down the road in disorder and most of the men in a state of panic. Historians blame the retreat as much on officers' ineptitude as individual soldiers panicking. He mustered the men and ordered a retreat but by then many soldiers were withdrawing on their own. The next day the ROK 17th Regiment enveloped the North Korean position that had launched the attack and captured two light machine guns, one mortar, and about 30 North Koreans who appeared to be guerrillas. The ROK 17th Regiment fought in the hills for the next two days, making some limited gains, and then it moved back to Sangju to join other units as part of the ROK reorganization in progress around Pusan. This left only the US 24th Infantry Regiment guarding the west approach to Sangju from the Mun'gyong plateau.

The tendency to panic continued in nearly all the 24th Infantry operations west of Sangju. Men left their positions and straggled to the rear. They abandoned weapons on positions. On many occasions units lost most of their equipment while on the move, even when not under fire, causing logistical shortages. In other cases the majority of a unit would desert its position at the first sign of North Korean fire.

By July 26 all three battalions of the 24th Infantry were concentrated in remote battle positions that were difficult to resupply, astride the road 10 miles (16 km) west of Sangju. The shortage of UN troops forced the regiment to devote most of its troops to the front, leaving very few reserves to respond to attacks. Elements of the KPA 15th Division advancing on this road had cleared the mountain passes and were closing with the regiment. From July 26 to the end of the month the North Koreans had almost constant contact with the 24th Infantry, which was supported by the 159th and 64th Field Artillery Battalions and one battery of the 90th Field Artillery Battalion. The North Koreans relied heavily on massed charges to close rapidly on the US lines. This caused heavy casualties for the North Koreans, but their mortars and artillery inflicted significant casualties on the American lines in turn.

During the last days of July, the 24th Infantry generally tried to hold positions during the day, and then withdrew at night. Their performance was mixed; during the first few North Korean attacks, most units held positions until they ran out of ammunition. Higher officers attempted to move the units back in position but were unsuccessful in the face of mounting North Korean resistance. Notably, L Company fought until surrounded by North Korean attackers; the rest of the regiment was able to drive them off.

On July 29 the 1st Battalion suffered about 60 casualties from North Korean mortar fire. As the men were preparing their perimeter defense for the night, a general panic arose, for reasons that are still unclear. Most of them deserted their positions in a state of alarm. Colonel White found himself, the 77th Combat Engineer Company and a battery of the 159th Field Artillery Battalion all that was left in the front line. He had to personally reorganize the battalion as many of his officers were unable to get the men to listen to them. As White tried to rally his men, the field artillery maintained a sustained barrage of fire to slow the North Koreans advance. That night alone the artillery fired 3,000 rounds in holding back the North Koreans.

=== US withdrawal ===
In the final days of the fight, to the west of Sangju, Major John R. Woolridge, one of the regiment's senior officers, set up a check point west of the town and stopped every vehicle coming from the west, taking off stragglers attempting to retreat. Many jeeps were filled with six or seven men claiming they were retreating after their position was overrun. He averaged about 75 stragglers a day, and 150 on the last day of the battle. A contingent of military police were dispatched specifically to collect men abandoning their positions and to return them to the front.

By July 30, the 24th Infantry had withdrawn to the last defensible high ground west of Sangju, 3 miles (4.8 km) from the town. The KPA hit the regiment with heavy attacks beginning at 05:00 that morning, targeting the 3rd Battalion's forward positions. Overstretched, lacking reserves and plagued by stragglers, the regiment began to come apart and senior commanders had to personally move into the front lines to help resist the KPA advance with their sidearms. The regiment had deteriorated so badly by this time that General Kean recalled the 1st Battalion, 35th Infantry, and placed it in defensive positions behind the 24th Infantry, to hold the line when the 24th withdrew. The next day the KPA again pressed against the regiment's forward line of resistance. First Lieutenant Leon A. Gilbert, commanding A Company, and about 15 men then quit the forward line. White and other ranking officers ordered Gilbert back into position, but he refused to go, saying that he was scared. The senior noncommissioned officer returned to the forward position with the men. After regimental commanders pleaded unsuccessfully with Gilbert to return to his position, he was arrested and tried for desertion under fire, a capital offense, and sentenced to death. His sentence was later reduced to 17 years in prison, but he served only five of them.

Finally, during the night of July 31 the 24th Infantry Regiment withdrew through Sangju. The 1st Battalion, 35th Infantry, covered the withdrawal. The KPA 15th Division set up a new defensive line at Sangju the next day as the 25th Infantry Division was moved to deal with a growing attack on Masan to the south.

== Aftermath ==
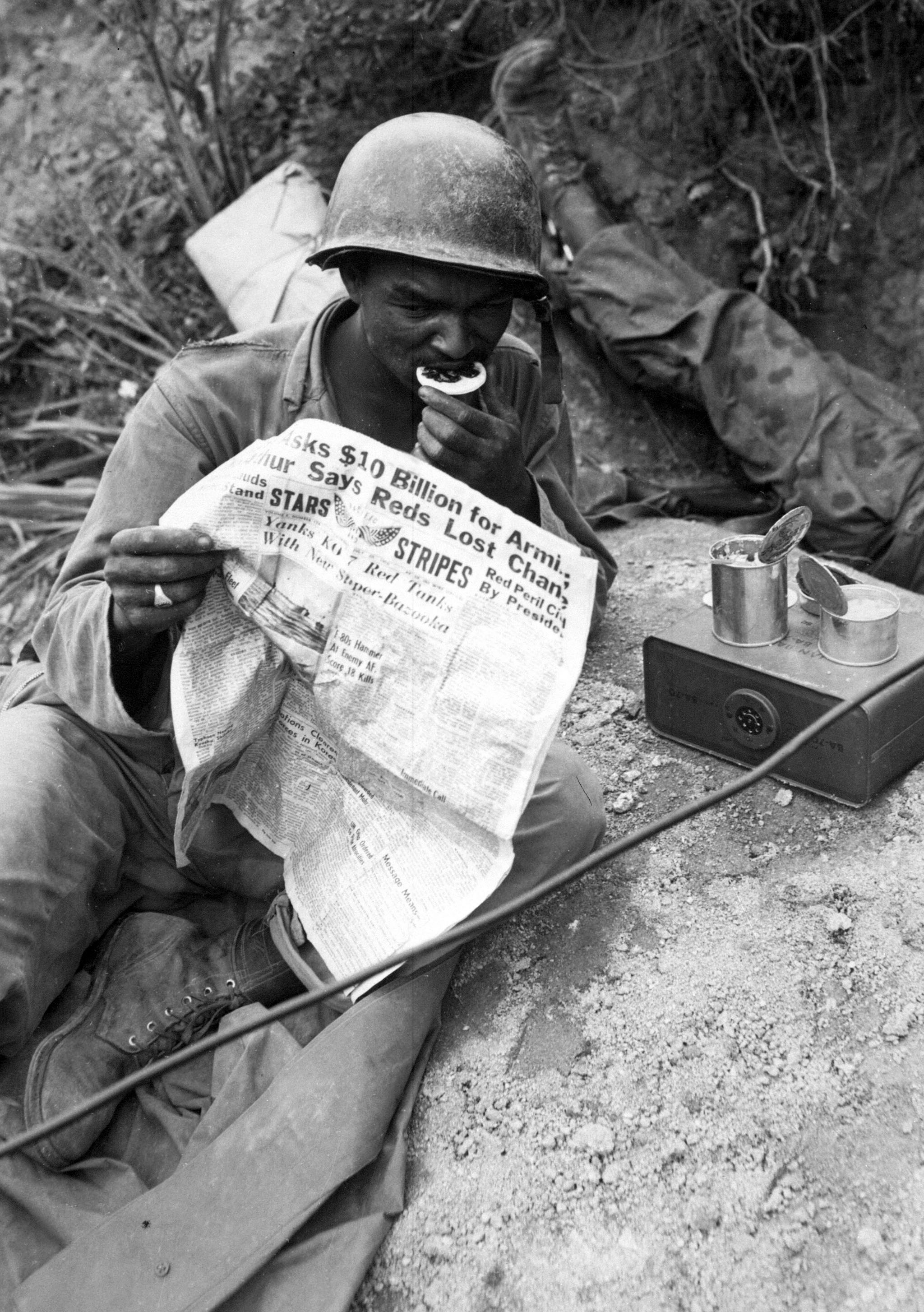
A soldier of the 24th Infantry rests during a lull in the Pusan Perimeter fighting.

In 11 days of action in the Sangju area the 24th Regiment had suffered 323 battle casualties, 27 killed, 293 wounded, and 3 missing. The light casualty count was partially credited to effective use of fortifications and North Korean caution in advancing during the fight, but the fact that 24th Infantry troops were quick to withdraw was also blamed. The regiment, a mostly black unit left over from the US military's recently abolished segregated system, was blasted for its poor performance during the fight. Walker, seeing the 24th Infantry as an ineffective unit, resolved to use it only as a "trip wire force" on the front lines, requiring it to be reinforced by another regiment in reserve to conduct serious resistance when the 24th broke. Other leaders saw the poor performance as a reason to demand further integration of the armed forces, which had not been easy to do before the war. The 24th Infantry was fully desegregated on October 1, 1951.

In reaching the upper Naktong valley at the end of July, the North Korean divisions engaged in this part of the drive southward had suffered heavy casualties. The KPA 1st Division in battling across the Mun'gyong plateau against the ROK 6th Division not only suffered great losses in the ground battle but also took serious losses from UN aerial attack. Prisoners reported that by the time it reached Hamch'ang at the end of July it was down to 3,000 men from the 5,500 it had before the push. The KPA 15th Division, according to prisoners, also lost heavily to artillery and mortar fire in its drive on Sangju against ROK troops and the US 24th Infantry Regiment, and was down to about 5,000 men at the end of July, from 7,500 before the fight. In contrast, the KPA 13th Division had bypassed Hamch'ang on the west and, save for minor skirmishes with ROK troops and the 2nd Battalion, 35th Infantry, it had not been engaged and consequently had suffered relatively few casualties.

In the years since the war, the battle has been investigated as an example of the prevalence of racism in the US Army during the Korean War. The 24th Infantry, though officially desegregated, was still made up overwhelmingly of African-American soldiers. Historians contend its accomplishments, particularly at Yechon, were ignored while shortcomings were seized upon to depict the 24th as a sub-par unit and African-Americans as inferior soldiers to whites. Historians have also pointed out that although the performance of the 24th Infantry was indeed poor, these failings were exaggerated due to racism. Black Soldier, White Army, a 1988 book by William T. Bowers, William M. Hammond and George L. MacGarrigle, concluded that a combination of an overextended line and inexperienced white officers who were not firm or effective in asserting their authority were the primary factors in the performance of the 24th. Others contend that the untested regiment performed similarly to units of the 24th Infantry Division and 1st Cavalry Division in their first engagements. With training, many of the same troops became effective fighters in a matter of weeks. Lieutenant Colonel Charles M. Bussey, a member of the 24th Infantry that participated in the battle, claimed in his memoir Firefight at Yechon: Courage and Racism in the Korean War that the 24th Infantry's good performances, particularly at Yechon, were ignored, and soldiers denied medals for their actions because of racism.

== See also ==
- Military history of African Americans
