= Leon Gilbert =

Leon Aaron Gilbert Jr.
- Born: November 9, 1920; York, Pennsylvania, U.S.
- Died: March 28, 1999 (aged 78); York, Pennsylvania, U.S.
- Military career
- Allegiance: United States of America
- Branch: United States Army
- Service years: 1940–1950
- Rank: First Lieutenant
- Unit: 24th Infantry Regiment
- Commands: Company A, 24th Infantry Regiment
- Conflicts: World War II; Korean War

Leon Aaron Gilbert Jr. (November 9, 1920 – March 28, 1999) was a decorated World War II combat veteran and a lieutenant in the all-black 24th U. S. Infantry Regiment that fought in the Korean War. His court-martial for refusing to obey an order from the regiment's white commanding officer led to worldwide protests and increased attention to segregation and racism in the U.S. military.

== Background regarding race in the United States military ==
By the early 1950s, various Executive Orders had been issued attempting to end segregation in the U.S. armed forces. They had been largely ineffectual. The 24th Infantry Regiment, which consisted entirely of black soldiers, was thrown into the forefront of the Korean fighting at the outset.

Casualties in the 24th were extremely heavy, and replacements and supplies, including shoes, were slow in coming. At one point the U.S. Air Force bombed the 24th by mistake, resulting in serious casualties.

On August 6, 1950, Colonel Arthur S. Champeny, a white man, was appointed the 24th's commanding officer and informed them he was going to change their reputation from "the frightened 24th to the fighting 24th."

== Gilbert's case ==
I thought I was doing the right thing. I still think so.

— Gilbert, after sentencing

Leon Aaron Gilbert, Jr. was born in York, Pennsylvania on November 9, 1920, the eldest of two sons of a blacksmith who had also served in World War I. He was educated in local schools and enlisted in the U. S. Army at Harrisburg, Pennsylvania on August 16, 1940. He served with the 92d Division in Italy and was honorably discharged in 1946, then called up again as a reservist in 1947. He was thus a decorated veteran with a record of ten years' service in the Army. He and his wife Kay had two children with a third on the way.

In the fall of 1950, Gilbert was in command of Company A of the 24th, having taken over when his commanding officer was wounded. He received an order to return with twelve of his men to a forward position. Gilbert's company had been forced to withdraw from that position after coming under heavy machine gun fire at close to point blank range, so to return to that position would have been tantamount to suicide. When Gilbert refused the order to return, he was arrested and tried on the spot. Despite Gilbert's suffering from shock and fatigue due to prolonged heavy fighting (according to a letter to his wife, they had gone thirteen days without food or water), he was accused of insubordination and cowardice, and a court martial sentenced him to death. In an interview with the New York Times, Gilbert gave his version of the incident.

I did not refuse to obey the order. I was trying to explain why it couldn't be carried out. There were twelve men in my command. Then I considered it my duty as an officer to show why the order meant certain death.

A storm of public protest erupted around the world in reaction to the sentencing; in the U.S., labor leaders, church leaders, and the American Legion became involved, and the National Negro Council collected 600,000 signatures on a petition for his pardon. President Harry S. Truman commuted the sentence to 20 years' imprisonment at hard labor, dishonorable discharge, and forfeiture of all pay and pension allowances.

In September 1952, the sentence was reduced to 17 years for "battle misconduct." Gilbert served five years, the maximum penalty for disobedience under peacetime conditions (war was never officially declared in Korea), before he was released.

Thurgood Marshall, general counsel of the NAACP, wrote "The letters we have received from convicted soldiers and the talks we have had with war correspondents strongly indicate that many of these men have been victimized by racial discrimination.... It seems apparent that some of them are being made scapegoats for the failures of higher personnel."

In 1996, an official Army report noted that Gilbert's regiment performed poorly in the early years of the Korean War, as did many white units, but went on to say, "There was no single reason for what happened (to the 24th)...An aggressive enemy, old and worn equipment, inexperience at all levels, leadership failures high and low, casualties among key personnel and a lack of bonding and cohesion in some units all played their part. There was no lack of courage among the officers and men."

The incident scarred Gilbert for life. His father had died while he was in custody, and five years after he was released on parole, his wife divorced him. Gilbert returned to his hometown of York, Pennsylvania, remarried, and lived quietly until his death. Although he never stopped trying to clear his name, to little avail, his last years were cheered somewhat by the fact that his surviving comrades-in-arms had never forgotten him, and after they had located him, welcomed him back into their ranks. As one of them reported, "He didn't know if we would accept him. We welcomed him with open arms. No matter what was written, no matter what was said, we know the facts. We were there."
