= 24th Infantry Regiment =

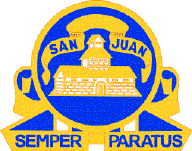
- Badge
- Active: 1869–1951; 1995–present
- Country: United States
- Branch: United States Army
- Type: Light Infantry
- Size: 1 Battalion
- Part of: 1st BCT, 11th Airborne Division
- Garrison/HQ: Fort Wainwright, Alaska
- Nickname: "Blockhouse" "Deuce Four" (special designation)
- Motto: Semper Paratus (Always Prepared)
- Engagements: Indian Wars; Spanish–American War; Siege of Santiago; Philippine–American War; Pancho Villa Expedition; Camp Logan Mutiny; World War II; Korean War; War on terror; Iraq War; War in Afghanistan (2001–2021); Operation Inherent Resolve

Commanders
- Current commander: 1st Battalion - LTC Nikolaus Sifers
- Notable commanders: Ranald Mackenzie; Henry C. Merriam; Zenas R. Bliss; John W. O'Daniel; John T. Corley; Michael E. Kurilla

Insignia
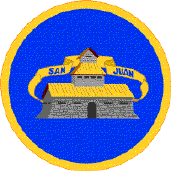
- Distinctive unit insignia

The 24th Infantry Regiment is a unit of the United States Army, active from 1869 until 1951, and since 1995. Before its original dissolution in 1951, it was primarily made up of African American soldiers.

== History ==
The 24th Infantry Regiment (one of the Buffalo Soldier regiments) was organized on 1 November 1869 from the 38th U.S. Infantry Regiment (formed 24 July 1866) and the 41st U.S. Infantry Regiment (formed 27 July 1866). All the enlisted soldiers were black, either veterans of the U.S. Colored Troops or freedmen. From its activation until 1898, the 24th Infantry served throughout the Western United States. Its missions included garrisoning frontier posts, fighting Native Americans, protecting roadways against bandits, and guarding the border between the United States and Mexico.

Medal of Honor:

- Wham Paymaster Robbery, Arizona Territory 11 May 1889
  - Sergeant Benjamin Brown, Corporal Isaiah Mays
- Black Seminole: United States Scouts, Canyon Blanco, Staked Plains, Texas (Red River War)
  - Private Adam Paine
- Black Seminole: United States Scouts, Pecos Texas 25 April 1875
  - Sergeant John Ward, trumpeter Isaac Payne, private Pompey Factor

=== Spanish–American War ===
The year 1898 saw the 24th Infantry deployed to Cuba as part of the U.S. Expeditionary Force in the Spanish–American War. Elements of the 24th participated in the storming of the Spanish El Viso fortress in the Battle of El Caney. At the climactic Battle of San Juan Hill under the command of Emerson H. Liscum, supported by intensive fire from the Gatling Gun Detachment, units of the 24th Infantry accompanied by elements of the 6th and 13th Infantry Regiments, assaulted and seized the Spanish-held blockhouse and trench system atop San Juan Hill.

=== Vancouver Barracks ===
Company B arrived on 3 April 1899 at Vancouver Barracks, the first African American regiment to serve as part of the garrison there.

=== Philippine–American War ===
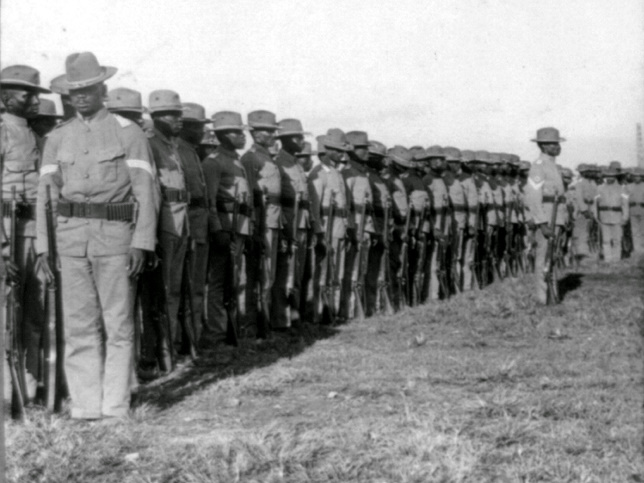
The 24th U.S. Infantry at drill, Camp Walker, Philippine Islands 1902

In 1899 the regiment deployed to the Philippines to help suppress a guerrilla movement in the Philippine–American War. The regiment returned to the Islands in 1905, 1907, and 1911. Though the 24th fought a number of battles in the Philippines, one of the most notable occurred on 7 December 1899, when nine soldiers from the regiment routed 100 guerrillas from their trenches. Notable commanders during this period included Medal of Honor recipient Colonel Henry Blanchard Freeman and Colonel Charles L. Hodges, who commanded in the Philippines in 1907 and retired as a major general in 1911.

=== Mexican border ===
In 1916 the 24th Infantry guarded the Mexico–United States border to keep the Mexican Revolution from spilling onto U.S. soil. When it did, the 24th joined the "Punitive Expedition" under General Pershing and entered Mexico to fight Pancho Villa's forces. In 1919, rebels and troops of the Mexican government fought in Ciudad Juárez, Chihuahua, which borders the U.S. city of El Paso, Texas. The 24th Infantry crossed over again to engage the rebels, ensuring that no violence erupted across the U.S. border.

=== Pre-World War I and the Houston Riot ===
During the nadir of American race relations and just months after America's entry into World War I, the soldiers of this historic all-black unit had been dispatched to guard the construction of Camp Logan, a military facility in Harris County, where they met animosity from local white civilians. When white police beat and arrested a black private who tried to intervene during the violent daytime arrest of a black washer woman, the woman, Sarah Travers, and the soldier, Pvt Alonso Edwards, were jailed. A black corporal sent to inquire after the private, was pistol-whipped, chased and shot at, before being dragged out from under a bed and arrested. After untrue rumors of the corporal's murder spread to other soldiers, hostility boiled over.

The Houston Riot of 1917 was an alleged mutiny by 156 black soldiers of the 24th Infantry; it has been called the Camp Logan Riots. Sergeant Vida Henry of I Company, 3rd Battalion led about 150 black soldiers in a two-hour march on Houston because they had suffered racial discrimination in the city. The soldiers were met by local policemen and a great crowd of Houston residents, who had armed themselves. When the soldiers killed Captain J. W. Mattes of the Illinois National Guard (after mistaking him for a local policeman), the battalion fell into disarray. In their two-hour march on the city, the battalion killed 15 whites, some armed, including four policemen, a white child and seriously wounded 12 others, one of whom, a policeman, subsequently died. Five black soldiers were killed. Two were accidentally shot by their own men, one in camp and the other on San Felipe Street. The rioters were tried at three courts-martial. Nineteen men were executed by hanging, and 63 were given life sentences. On November 13, 2023, the Army set aside the convictions of the 110 soldiers. "After a thorough review, the Board has found that these Soldiers were wrongly treated because of their race and were not given fair trials," said Secretary of the Army Christine Wormuth. "By setting aside their convictions and granting honorable discharges, the Army is acknowledging past mistakes and setting the record straight.”

=== Interwar period ===
The 24th Infantry was stationed at Camp Furlong, New Mexico, as of June 1919 as a separate regiment. It was transferred 12 June 1919 to Camp Owen Biernie, Texas, to protect El Paso from a Villista incursion from Juarez, Mexico. During skirmishing that broke out along the border, the regiment suffered one man killed and three wounded. It returned on 25 June 1919 to Camp Furlong. The 2nd Battalion was transferred on 10 February 1920 to Camp Shannon, Hachita, New Mexico. The 3rd Battalion was reduced to minimal manning on 24 September 1921 with personnel transferred to the 1st and 2d Battalions. The 3rd Battalion records were transferred to Fort Benning, Georgia, and the battalion was reorganized there on 1 December 1921 with 7 officers and 354 men from the Infantry School Detachment (Colored). The 2nd Battalion was transferred 30 June 1922 to Camp Furlong. The regiment, less the 3rd Battalion, was transferred by troop train to Fort Benning, Georgia, and arrived there on 16 September 1922. It was assigned to the Infantry School as the school support and demonstration regiment, and was reorganized in conjunction with special tables of organization in May 1927. The 3rd Battalion and Companies D and H were inactivated on 1 August 1927 at Fort Benning. In April 1933, the regiment assumed command and control of Civilian Conservation Corps District H, Fourth Corps Area. Assigned Reserve officers conducted summer training with the regiment at Fort Benning. The 3rd Battalion and Companies D and H were activated on 15 January 1941. The regiment participated in the Carolina Maneuvers of October-November 1941.

=== World War II ===
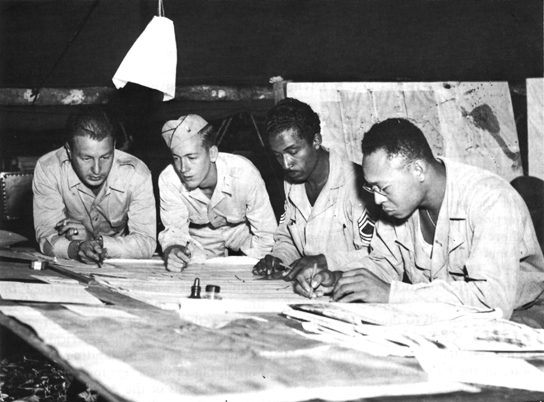
Soldiers plotting defensive positions in March of 1944.

During World War II, the 24th Infantry fought in the South Pacific Theatre as a separate regiment. Deploying on 4 April 1942 from the San Francisco Port of Embarkation, the regiment arrived on Efate in the New Hebrides Islands on 4 May 1942. A Company was sent to Espirto Santo to clear jungle with the 3rd Naval Construction Battalion Detachment building an airfield at Turtle Bay. Another Company was sent to Nouméa to work with B Co. on CB 3 on Ile Nou. First they worked on extending a Navy landing pier. When that was done they assisted in pontoon assembly. The 24th moved to Guadalcanal on 28 August 1943, and was assigned to the XIV Corps. 1st Battalion deployed to Bougainville, attached to the 37th Infantry Division, from March to May 1944 for perimeter defense duty. The regiment departed Guadalcanal on 8 December 1944 and landed on Saipan and Tinian on 19 December 1944 for Garrison Duty that included mopping up the remaining Japanese forces that had yet to surrender. The regiment was assigned to the Pacific Ocean Area Command on 15 March 1945, and then to the Central Pacific Base Command on 15 May 1945, and to the Western pacific Base Command on 22 June 1945.

The regiment departed Saipan and Tinian on 9 July 1945, and arrived on the Kerama Islands off Okinawa on 29 July 1945. At the end of the war, the 24th took the surrender of forces on the island of Aka-shima, the first formal surrender of a Japanese Imperial Army garrison. The regiment remained on Okinawa through 1946.

=== Korean War ===
From the end of World War II through 1947, the 24th occupied Okinawa, Japan, after which it relocated to Gifu, Japan. On 1 February 1947, the regiment reorganized as a permanent regiment of the 25th Infantry Division. Despite the desegregation of the U.S. armed forces in 1948 by Executive Order 9981, the 24th Infantry remained predominantly African–American, with an officer corps of both African and European Americans. In late June 1950, soon after North Korea invaded South Korea, the 24th deployed to Korea to assist in the Korean War.

The 24th Infantry fought throughout the entire Korean peninsula, from the defense of the "Pusan Perimeter" to its breakout and the pursuit of the Korean People's Army (KPA) into North Korea, to the Chinese counteroffensives and finally to U.N. counteroffensives that stabilized near the current Korean Demilitarized Zone. The regiment received the Republic of Korea Presidential Unit Citation for its defense of the Pusan Perimeter. The regiment also had three posthumous Medal of Honor recipients: Cornelius H. Charlton, Ray E. Duke and William Thompson.

The cases of Lieutenant Leon Gilbert, court martialed for refusing an order from the 24th's commanding officer (who was white), and of some other members of the 24th, helped bring greater attention to problems of segregation and discrimination within the U.S. military.

The landing at Inchon by U.S. and ROK forces on 15 September finally compelled the KPA to withdraw from the Pusan Perimeter. The 24th Infantry was divided into Task Forces Blair and Corley (named for their commanders), and they, along with several from other commands, began pursuing the KPA on 27 September.

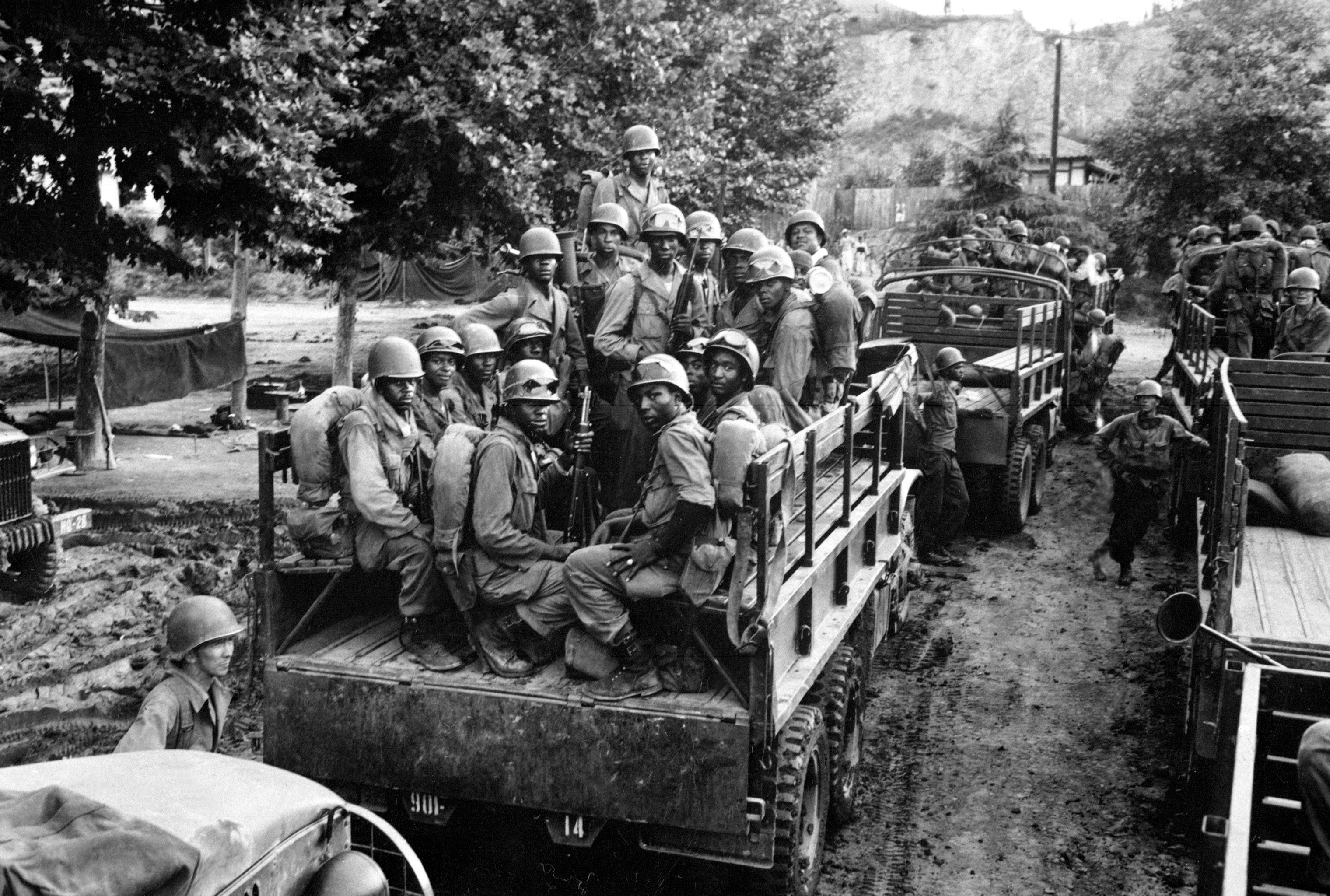
24th Infantry moves up to the firing line, 18 July 1950

The 25th Division remained in South Korea until ordered north in late November to participate in the Home by Christmas offensive. Later in November, overwhelming assaults by Chinese People's Volunteer Army (PVA) troops forced the U.S. Eighth Army to withdraw. On 29 November, the Chinese 40th Army flanked the 24th Infantry's line north of the Chongchon River in North Korea, forcing the neighboring 9th Regiment, 2nd Division to withdraw.

On 30 November, the 3/24th was at Kunu-ri, on the division's open right flank, with PVA troops behind it. With the help of air support, the battalion extricated itself, losing one soldier killed, 30 wounded and 109 missing. Overall, the 24th Infantry lost one-fifth of its officers and one-third of its enlisted men in the withdrawal across the Chongchon. Colonel Corley blamed the disarray of the 3rd Battalion on its commander, Lt. Col. Melvin E. Blair, whom he summarily relieved.

The Eighth Army's withdrawal did not cease until the force was well below the 39th parallel north. But by early March 1951, the American and ROK troops were again ready for a full-scale offensive.

On 6 March, the 25th Division advanced across the Han River. The 1/24th did well, moving over difficult terrain against an entrenched enemy. The 3rd Battalion initially also performed well, executing a hastily devised river crossing and advancing through rough country against well dug-in PVA troops, far from the 1st Battalion. While climbing up steep terrain, however, the 1/24th reportedly collapsed under PVA fire and withdrew in disorder. When the Division commander learned of that action, his confidence in the 24th plummeted. Many soldiers of the 24th ran away from the fight, tossing their weapons and equipment aside. A derisive poem throughout the U.S. Army stated: When them Chinese mortars begins to thud, the Old Deuce-Four begin to bug.

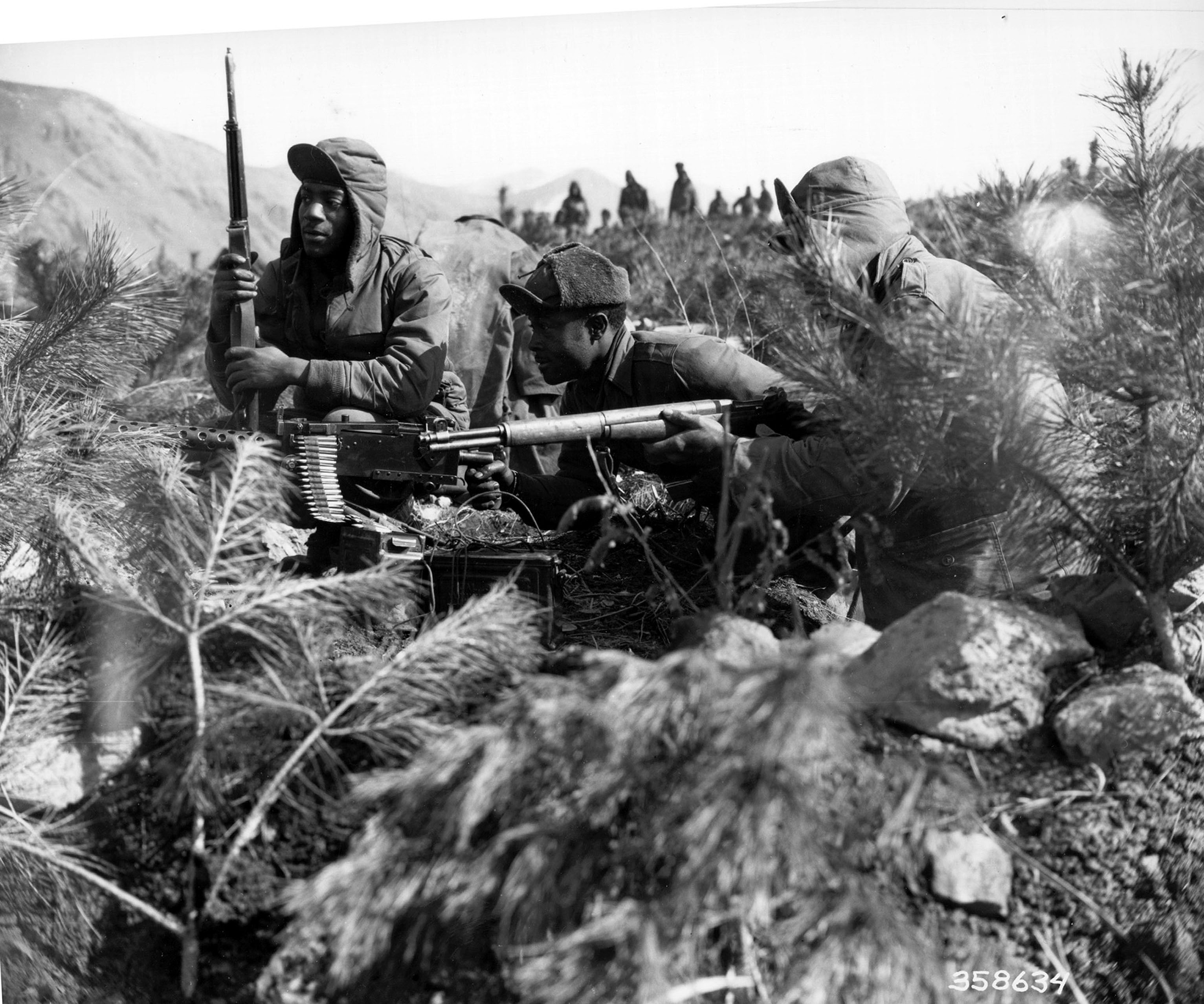
A machine gun crew of Co. A, 24th Infantry Regiment, during Korean War, 21 February 1951

Although the 24th performed well in the attack north of the Han and the subsequent general withdrawal of the Eighth Army after the Chinese Spring Offensive of 1951, its reputation was somewhat tarnished. But it performed well in the Army's drive back north in May and June 1951. In September 1950, the 24th's division commander, Gen. William B. Kean, requested that it be disbanded because it was "untrustworthy and incapable of carrying out missions expected of an infantry regiment."

In August, the regiment's new commander, Colonel Thomas D. Gillis, prodded by the Division commander, closely examined the 24th's record in Korea. Determining that leadership had been the problem, he relieved a number of officers. After the change in command, Company F conducted a valiant bayonet and grenade charge on 15 September. However the positive performance of Company F was ignored by higher commands and the news media. By 1 October 1951, the 24th was dissolved.

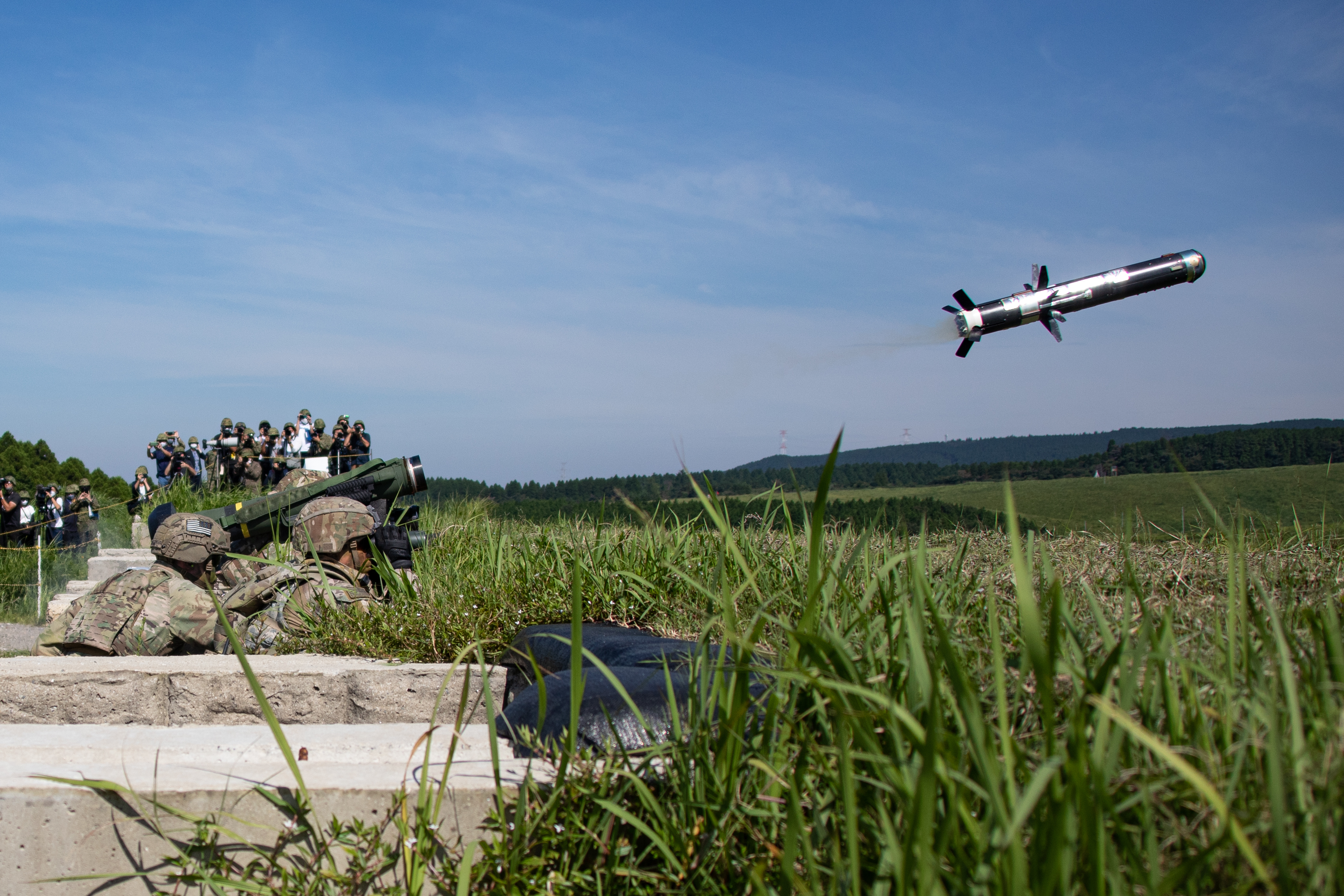
Soldiers fire the Javelin Anti-Tank Missile System during the Orient Shield 22 training exercise at Oyanohara Training Area, Kumamoto, Japan, August 28, 2022.

The Kokura incident (小倉黒人米兵集団脱走事件) was a mass rape event by mutinous American soldiers of the 24th Infantry Regiment (United_States) against Japanese women in the city of Kokura in July 1950, after they rioted against deployment to Korea.

22 year old American soldier James L. Clark from Marks, Missouri killed 4 Japanese who belonged to a single family, two sons and their parents on 4 July, 1950 in Kokura, leaving only Keiko, a 7 year old girl to survive. James Clark's original death sentence was commuted and he was not executed.

On 11 July, 1950 in Kokura, 75, 100, 200 or 250 soldiers of the US 24th Infantry Regiment which was at Camp Jōno and ordered to deploy into the Korean war rioted and escaped their camp and went on a raping spree in Kokura against Japanese women and killed a Japanese man. “Testimony revealed in the 1975 Fukuoka Prefectural edition of the Asahi suggests that some women were sexually assaulted in front of their husbands.” The mass rapes being committed by the US soldiers on Japanese women were mentioned in a US military police report to the Fukuoka Area Provost Marshal, chief of Kyushu Civil affairs region, on 17 July 1950.

US military censored all mention of the rapes in Japanese media.

A novel was written based on the events by a Japanese man from Kokura, Seichō Matsumoto. Duchess Harris wrote an essay “How negative stereotypes in material culture impact global politics”, criticising Matsumoto's novelisation for focusing on race in the incident, saying “The image of the Black GI as rapist has become something of a staple in Japanese pornography and films about the Occupation. The Black rapist trope also appears in Matsumoto Seicho’s short story, Kuroji no e.” Others also criticised his racial focus.

== Modern legacy ==
The 24th Infantry was reactivated in 1995 and assigned to the 1st Brigade, 25th Infantry Division in Fort Lewis, Washington. The regiment served in the Iraq War from 2004 to 2005, and was decorated for its service. In 2006, during a re-organization of the Army, the regiment was re-flagged; however, the 1st Battalion was not included, and so it alone retains the regimental designation and carries on its legacy. It is now part of the 1st Brigade Combat Team, 11th Airborne Division at Fort Wainwright, Alaska.

=== Operation Iraqi Freedom ===
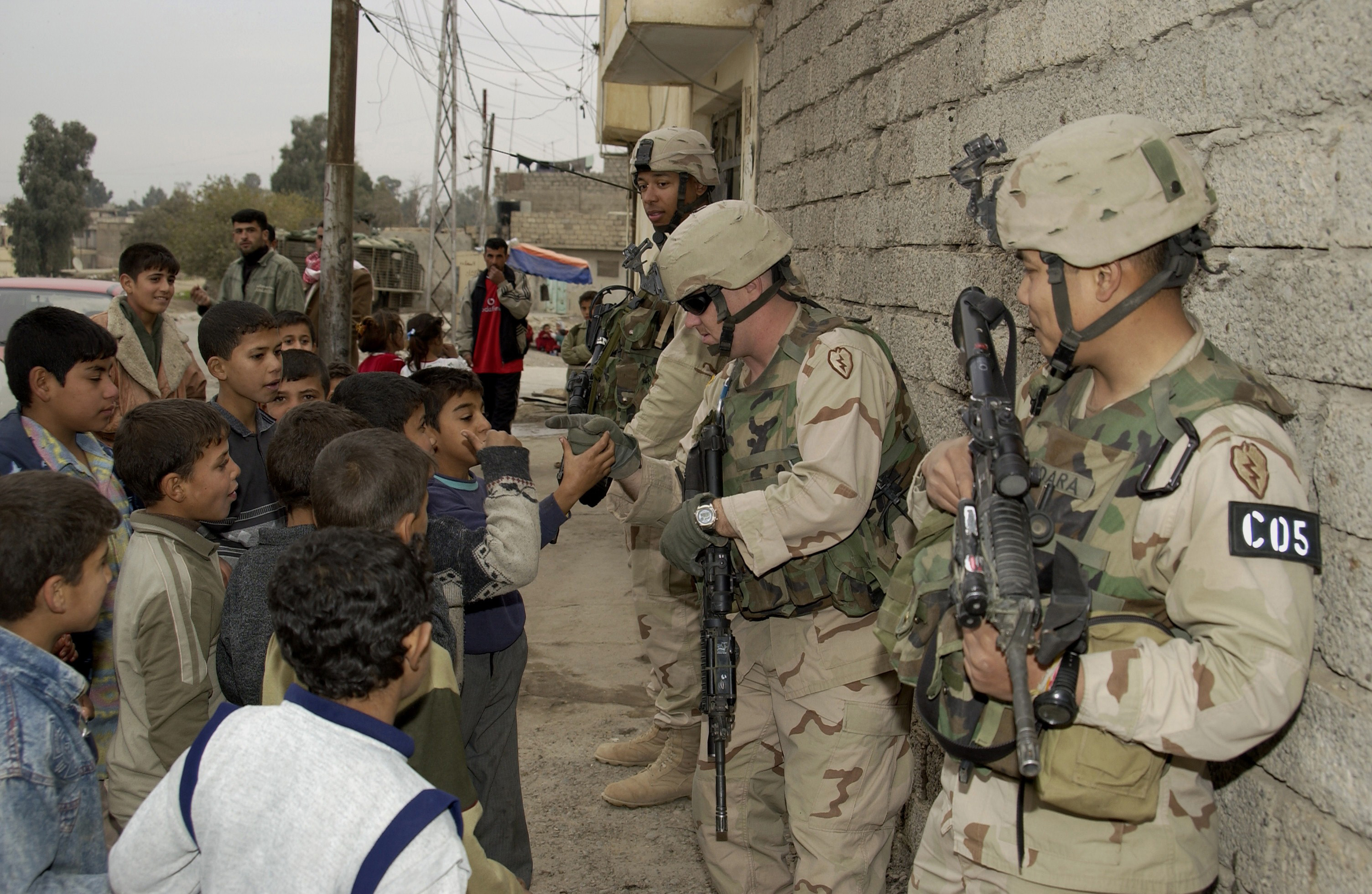
Soldiers with Iraqi children during a patrol in Mosul, Iraq on December 11, 2004.

The 1st Battalion, 24th Infantry Regiment was assigned to the 1st Brigade, 25th Infantry Division "Lightning" (a Stryker brigade), and served in Iraq from October 2004 to October 2005. The battalion came home with 5 Silver Stars, 31 Bronze Stars, and 181 Purple Hearts and played a crucial role in the Battle of Mosul (2004). During that battle, the battalion saw some of the heaviest, sustained fighting of the insurgency to date. The unit was also awarded with the Valorous Unit Award as being part of the 1st Brigade, 25th Infantry Division (SBCT). The battalion commander during this deployment rotation was future United States Central Command (CENTCOM) Commander, General Michael "Erik" Kurilla.

The unit reflagged as the 3rd Squadron, 2nd Stryker Cavalry Regiment and moved to Vilseck, Germany. The 1st Battalion, 24th Infantry Regiment replaced the 2nd Battalion, 1st Infantry Regiment of the now decommissioned 172nd Stryker Brigade Combat Team as of 14 December 2006.

In 2008–2009, 1-24 Infantry deployed to Diyala Governorate, Iraq to FOB Warhorse and later to FOB Grizzly. In contrast to their previous deployment involving the Battle of Mosul, 1-24 sustained very few casualties, none of which came from sustained engagement with enemy forces. For their reconstruction and humanitarian efforts during this tour, the unit was awarded the Meritorious Unit Citation along with sister units in the 1st Brigade, 25th Infantry Division "Lightning".

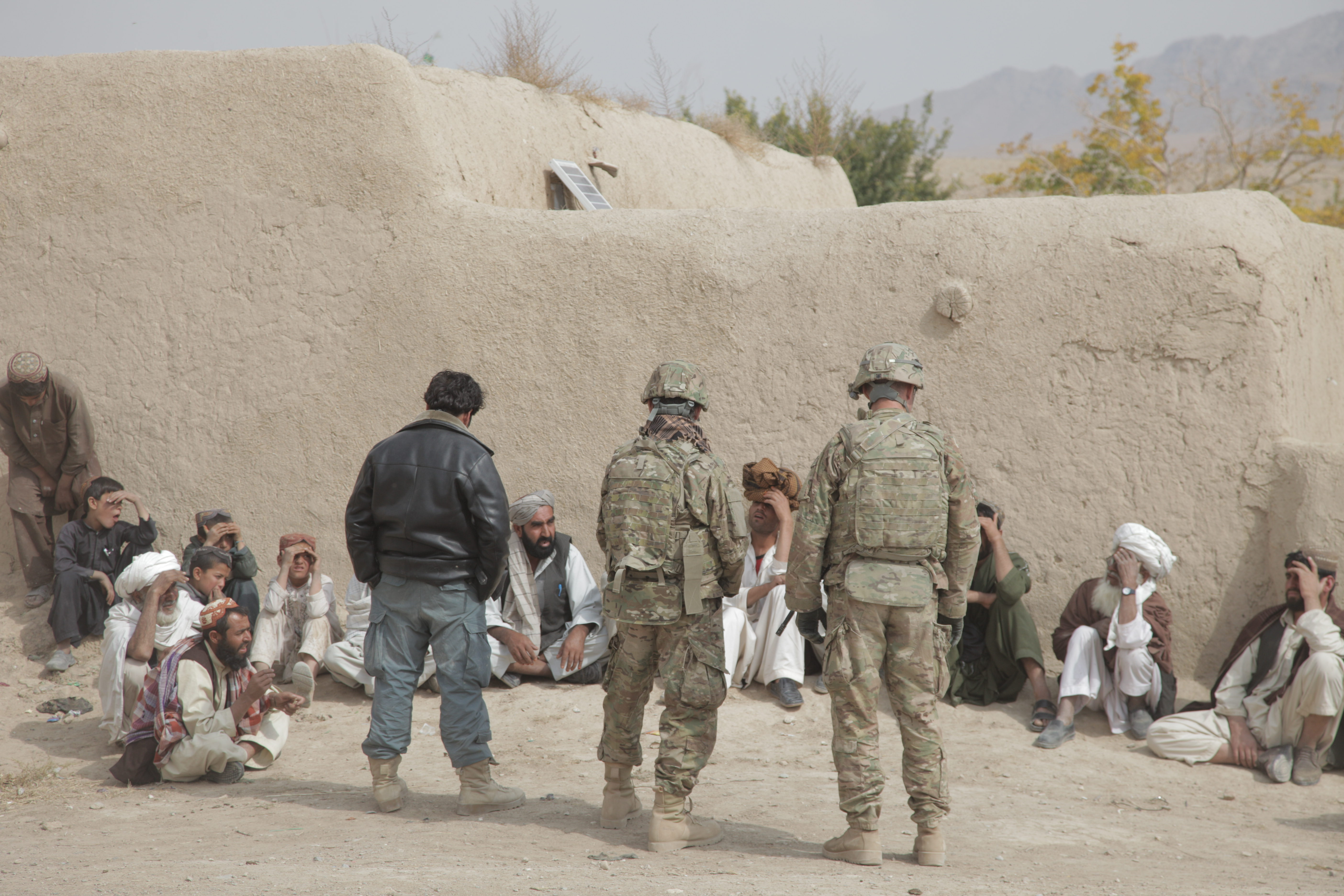
Two soldiers speaking with villagers in Zabul province on October 22, 2011.

=== Operation Enduring Freedom ===
The 1st Battalion, 24th Infantry Regiment deployed again under 1/25 SBCT to Afghanistan in support of Operation Enduring Freedom in 2011–2012. The battalion assumed responsibility for the Zabul Province, with assistance from Romanian units along Highway 1. The battalion HQ was primarily stationed at FOB Lagman in Zabul Province with companies co-located and dispersed north and south. 1-24 Infantry found themselves in a direct combat role again, losing several soldiers to Taliban attacks throughout their yearlong deployment, including an "insider attack" in Qalat on 8 January 2012.

=== Operation Inherent Resolve ===
The 1st Battalion, 24th Infantry Regiment deployed once again to Iraq (and some elements later to Syria under U.S. Army Special Forces) under 1/25 SBCT in support of Operation Inherent Resolve in 2019-2020. The unit was attacked by ballistic missiles launched by Iran's Islamic Revolutionary Guard Corps Aerospace Force during their Operation Martyr Soleimani in retaliation for the Assassination of Qasem Soleimani.

== Heraldry ==
=== Regimental badge ===
- Description:
1. On a blue field a block house of masonry with tower, walls in color of grey stone, roofs yellow.
2. On a yellow scroll, the words "SAN JUAN" in blue.
3. All encircled by a yellow band bearing the motto in blue "SEMPER PARATUS" (Always Prepared).
- Symbolism: The design commemorates the gallant service of the regiment in the Santiago campaign of 1898.
- Background:
1. The badge was approved on 1920-03-27.
2. The badge is used as the crest on the organizational colors. The breast of the eagle on the colors is feathered.

=== Distinctive unit insignia ===
- Description:
1. A gold color metal and enamel device 1 1/4 inches (3.2 cm) in width overall consisting of a blue disc bearing a white blockhouse with tower masoned and roofed gold below a gold scroll inscribed "SAN JUAN" in blue letters.
2. Attached below the disc a gold scroll turned blue and inscribed "SEMPER PARATUS" in blue letters.
- Symbolism:
1. Blue is the color associated with Infantry.
2. The house with tower depicts a blockhouse at San Juan Santiago de Cuba and commemorates the 1898 campaign service of the regiment.
- Background:
1. The distinctive unit insignia was originally approved for the 24th Infantry on 1923-01-21.
2. It was amended to correct the motto on 1923-03-21.
3. Amended to add the authorization for wear of the DUI on 1923-05-07.
4. Amended to add to the authorization for wear of the DUI on 1925-09-21.
5. On 1925-10-23 it was amended to change the appearance of the DUI.
6. The insignia was cancelled and a new insignia authorized on 1927-05-17.

== Lineage ==
- Constituted 28 July 1866 in the Regular Army as the 38th Infantry Regiment
- Organized 10 October 1866 at Jefferson Barracks, Missouri
- Consolidated 15 March 1869 with the 41st Infantry Regiment, and consolidated unit redesignated as the 24th Infantry Regiment
- Assigned 2 January 1947 to the 25th Infantry Division
- Relieved 1 August 1951 from assignment to the 25th Infantry Division
- Inactivated 1 October 1951 in Korea
- Reorganized 16 August 1995 as a parent regiment under the U.S. Army Regimental System
- Redesignated 1 October 2005 as the 24th Infantry Regiment
- Inactivated on 1 June 2006 at Fort Lewis, Washington, and relieved from assignment to the 25th Infantry Division
- Assigned 16 December 2006 to the 1st Brigade Combat Team, 25th Infantry Division, and activated at Fort Wainwright, Alaska
- Assigned 6 June 2022 to 1st Infantry Brigade Combat Team, 11th Airborne Division after the reflagging of 1st Stryker Brigade Combat Team, 25th Infantry Division.

== Honors ==
=== Campaign participation credit ===
- Indian Wars:
1. Comanches
- Spanish–American War:
1. Santiago
- Philippine–American War:
1. San Isidro
2. Luzon 1900
- World War II:
1. Northern Solomons
2. Western Pacific
- Korean War:
1. UN Defensive
2. UN Offensive
3. CCF Intervention
4. First UN Counteroffensive
5. CCF Spring Offensive
6. UN Summer-Fall Offensive

=== Decorations ===
1. Korean Presidential Unit Citation for MASAN-CHINJU.
2. Valorous Unit Award for Battle of Mosul.
3. Meritorious Unit Citation for service during Operation Iraqi Freedom in 2008–2009 in Diyala Governorate.

== Famous members ==
- Ranald Mackenzie the first commander of the regiment.
- William Shafter commanded the regiment after Mackenzie.
- Allen Allensworth served as chaplain of the 24th Infantry from 1886 to 1906, retiring at the rank of lieutenant colonel. As a chaplain, he developed educational programs for soldiers. After retiring, he founded the community of Allensworth, California.
- Special Forces Captain Harry G. Cramer, Jr. served most of his conventional career with 1st Battalion, 24th Infantry. He commanded Company B on Okinawa during the Occupation of Japan and commanded Companies B and D during the Korean War. He is considered the first U.S. Army Vietnam casualty, was the first Special Forces soldier to die in Vietnam, and was the first casualty of the 1st Special Forces Group.
- Oscar Charleston 1896-1954 (1911-1915) Major League Baseball Hall of Famer in 1976 (Considered the Best player of the Negro Major Leagues)
- MSG Joshua Wheeler (1995-1997) while assigned to the elite Delta Force, MSG Wheeler was the first American service member killed in action as a result of enemy fire while fighting ISIS militants. He was also the first American to be killed in action in Iraq since November 2011. MSG Josh Wheeler is the recipient of 11 Bronze Star Medals (4 of which are with Valor devices) and was posthumously awarded the Silver Star and the Purple Heart.
- General Michael Kurilla, former CENTCOM Commander.
- MG John Clem, Drummer boy of Shiloh, was commissioned 2LT by President Grant and assigned to the 24th Infantry in December 1871. Promoted to 1LT in 1875.

== Notes ==
- 24th Infantry Regiment (Buffalo Soldiers) US Army
