= Forts in Nebraska =

The following is a list of current and former forts in Nebraska.

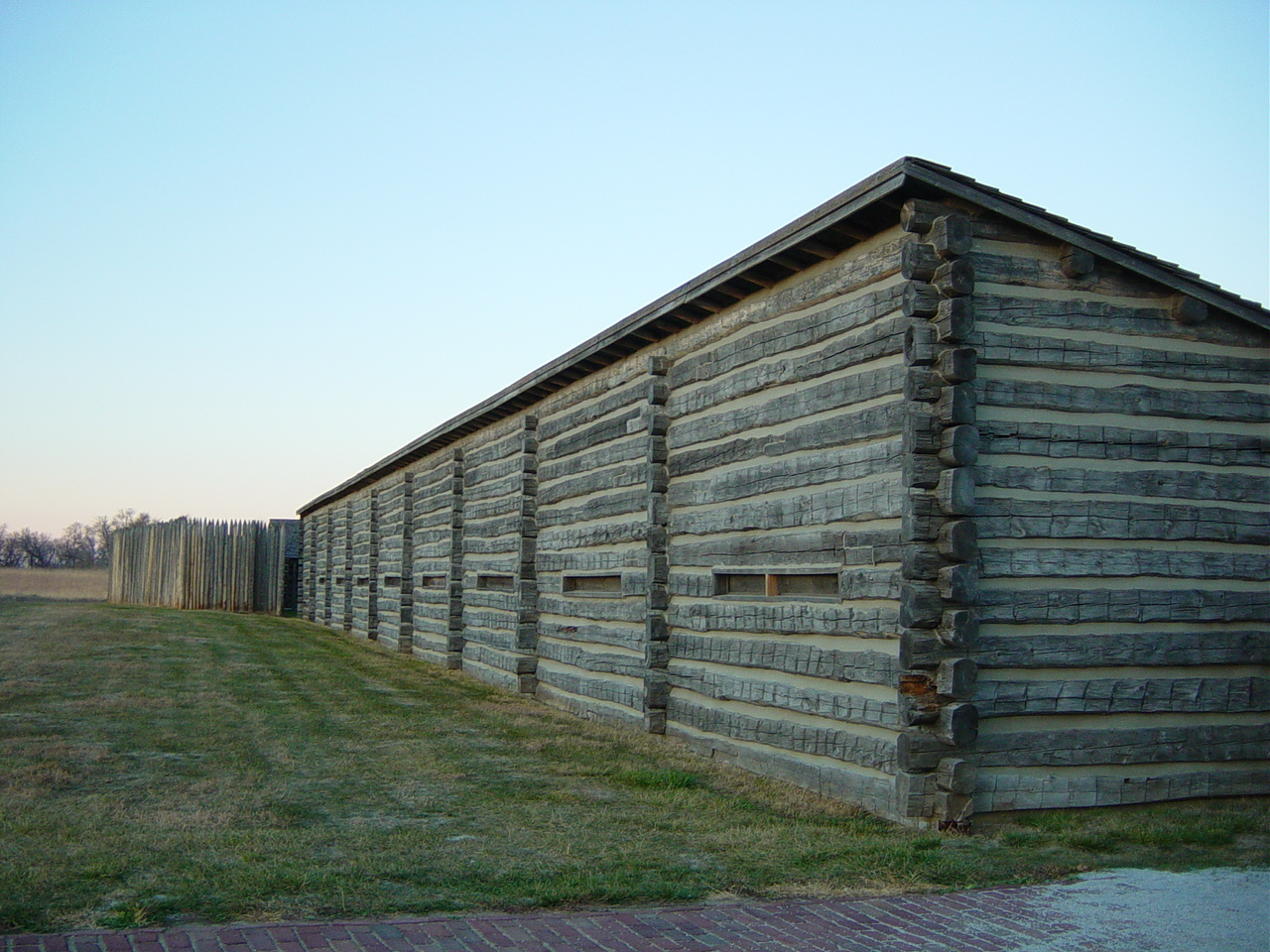
Western ramparts of Fort Atkinson.

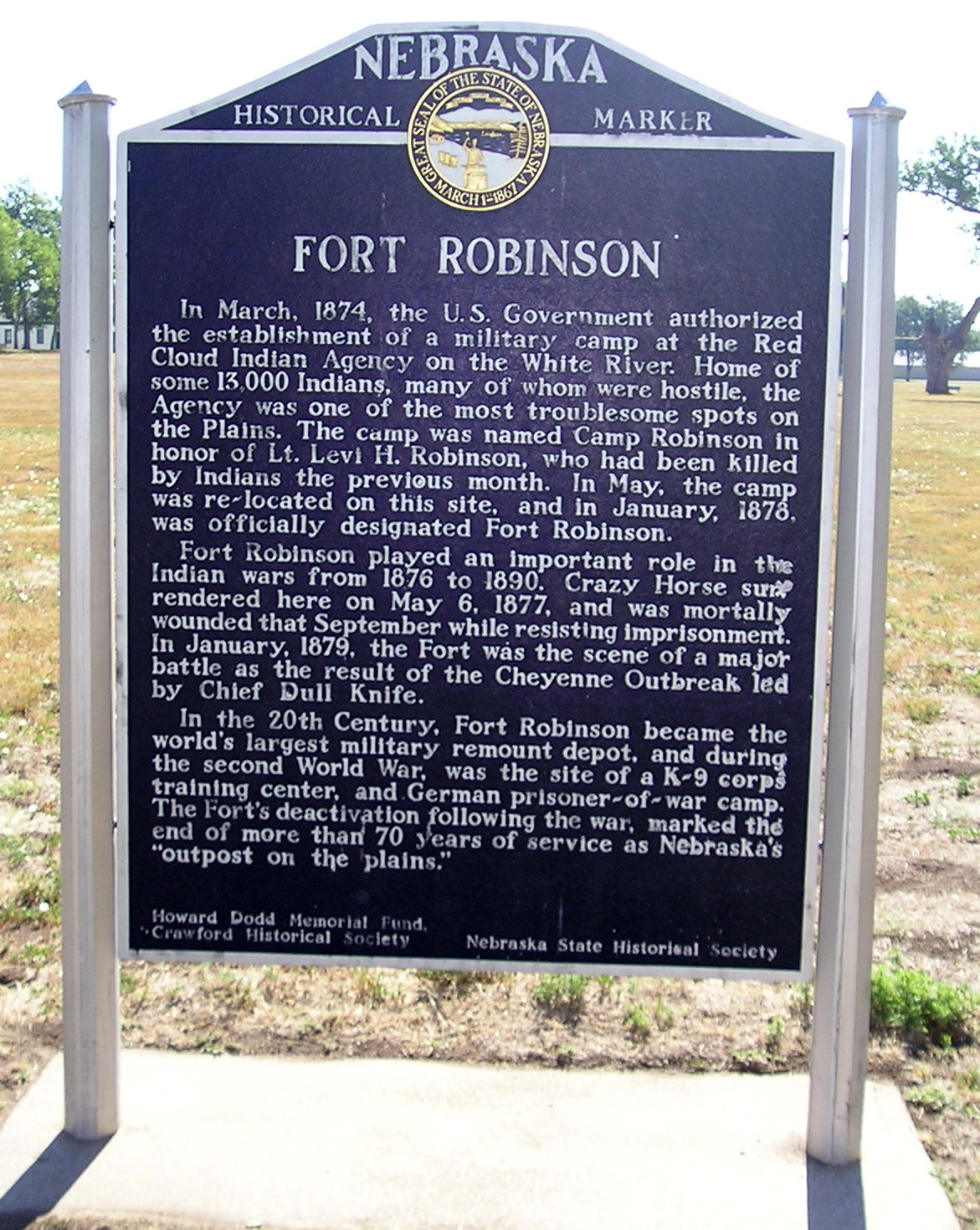
Nebraska State Historical Marker at Fort Robinson.

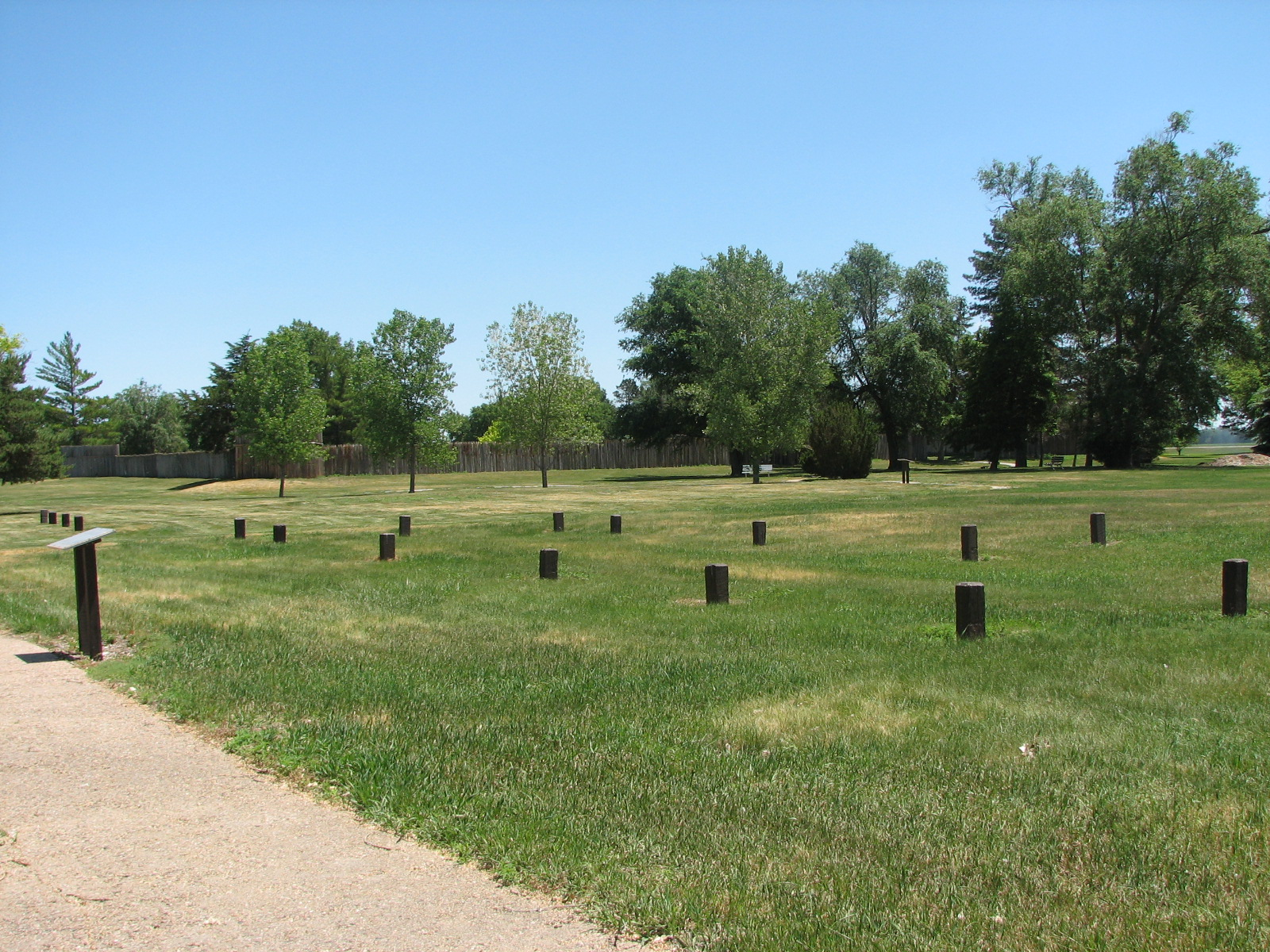
Restored Fort Kearny State Park looking from parade ground southwest over marked-off officers barracks foundation.

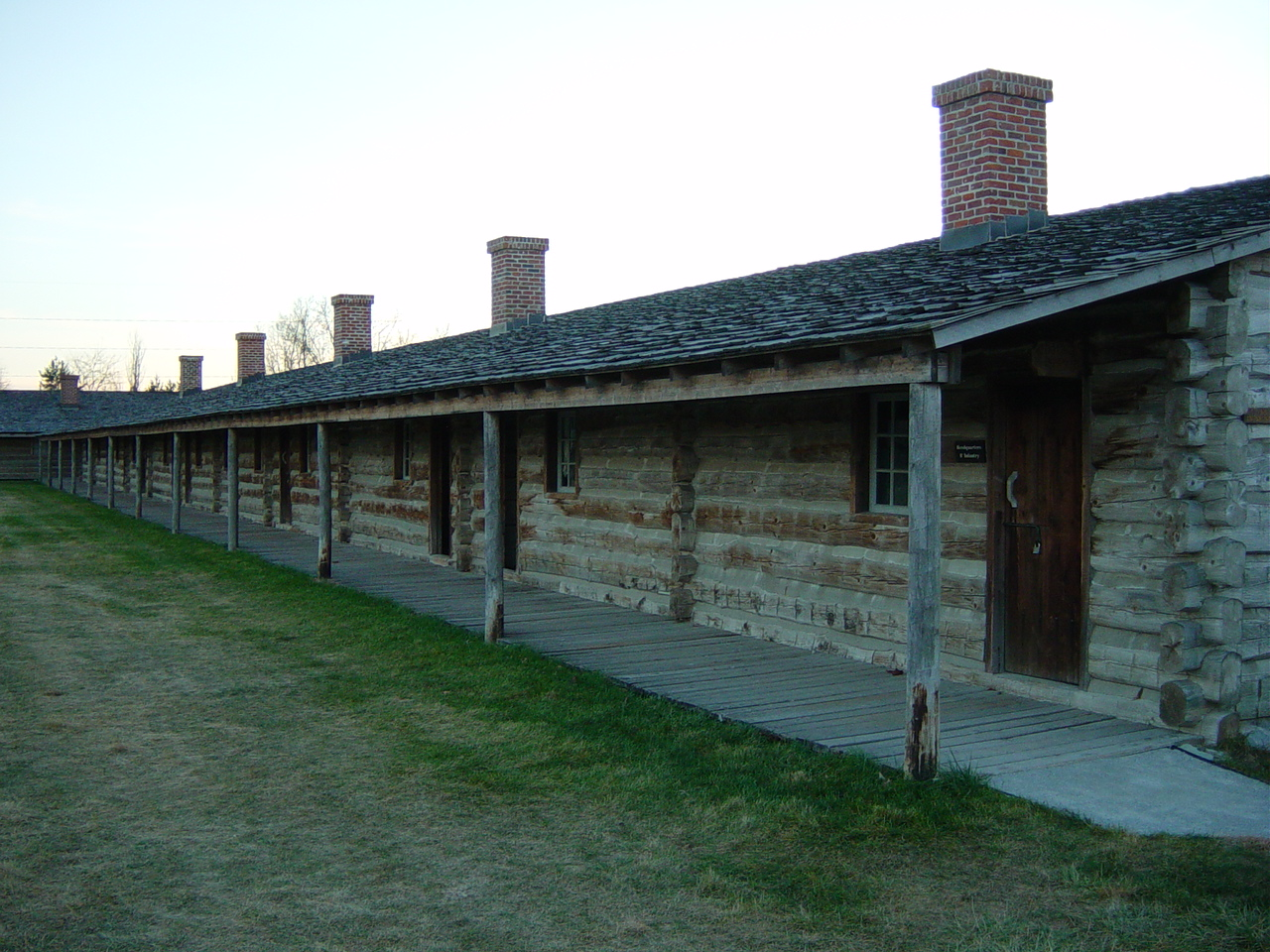
Detail of barracks at Fort Atkinson.

Military instillations in Nebraska alphabetical order
Name	Location	Period
Alkali Station		
Armas de Francia		
Fort Atkinson	Fort Calhoun	1819–1827
Camp Atlanta	Atlanta	1943–1946
Camp Augur		
Beauvais Station Post		
Fort Beaver Valley		
Fort Bellevue		
Bordeaux Trading Post	near Chadron	
Cabanné's Post	Omaha	1822–1840
Fort Calhoun	Fort Calhoun	
Fort Carlos		
Fort Charles		
Fort Childs		
Fort Clarke		
Columbia Fur Co. Post		
Columbus Post		
Fort Cottonwood	near Maxwell	
Post Cottonwood Springs		
Camp Council Bluff		
Cantonment Council Bluffs		
Fort Crook		
Crooks & McClelland Post		
Cruzatte's Post		
Elm Creek Fort		
Fontenelle's Post	Bellevue	1805–1856
Fort Gillette		
Gilman's Station Post		
Post at Grand Island	Grand Island	
Fort Grattan		
Fort Hartsuff		
Fort Heath		
Fort Independence		
Junction Station Post		
Fort Kearny	Kearney	1848–1871
Camp Keya Paha		
Fort Kiowa	Oacoma, South Dakota	
Liberty Pole Camp		
Fort Lisa	Omaha	1806-1820 est
Little Blue Station Post		
Mackay's House		
Camp McKean		
Cantonment McKean	near Maxwell	
Fort McPherson	near Maxwell	
Camp Meiklejohn		
Military Bridge Camp		
Fort Mirage Flats		
Camp Missouri		
Cantonment Missouri		
Camp Mitchell		
Fort Mitchell	near Scottsbluff	
Fort Montrose		
Mullaly's Ranch Post		
Nánza		
Fort Niobrara		
North Platte Station		
O'Fallon's Bluffs Post		
Omaha Barracks		
Omaha Quartermaster Depot	Omaha	1881–present
Fort Omaha	North Omaha	1861–1946
Omaha Post		
Post of the Otos		
Pawnee Post		
Pawnee Ranch Post		
Pilcher's Post		
Plum Creek Post		
Ponca Fort	Niobrara	1700–1865
Ponca Post		
Camp Recovery		
Camp Red Willow		
Robideaux Pass Post		
Camp Robinson		
Fort Robinson	Crawford	1874–1948
St. Deroin Fort		
Camp Sargent		
Sarpy's Post		
Camp Saunders		
Camp Sheridan	Hay Springs	1874–1881
Fort Sheridan		
Sherman Barracks		
Camp Sherman		
Camp Shuman	near Scottsbluff	
Sidney Barracks		
Fort Sidney		
Post at Spotted Tail Agency

== See also ==
- History of Nebraska
- Landmarks of the Nebraska Territory
- Department of the Platte

== Bibliography ==
- Hannings, Bud (2006). Forts of the United States: An Historical Dictionary, 16th through 19th Centuries. Jefferson, North Carolina: McFarland. ISBN 978-0-7864-1796-4.
