= Fort McPherson National Cemetery =

Historic veterans cemetery in Lincoln County, Nebraska

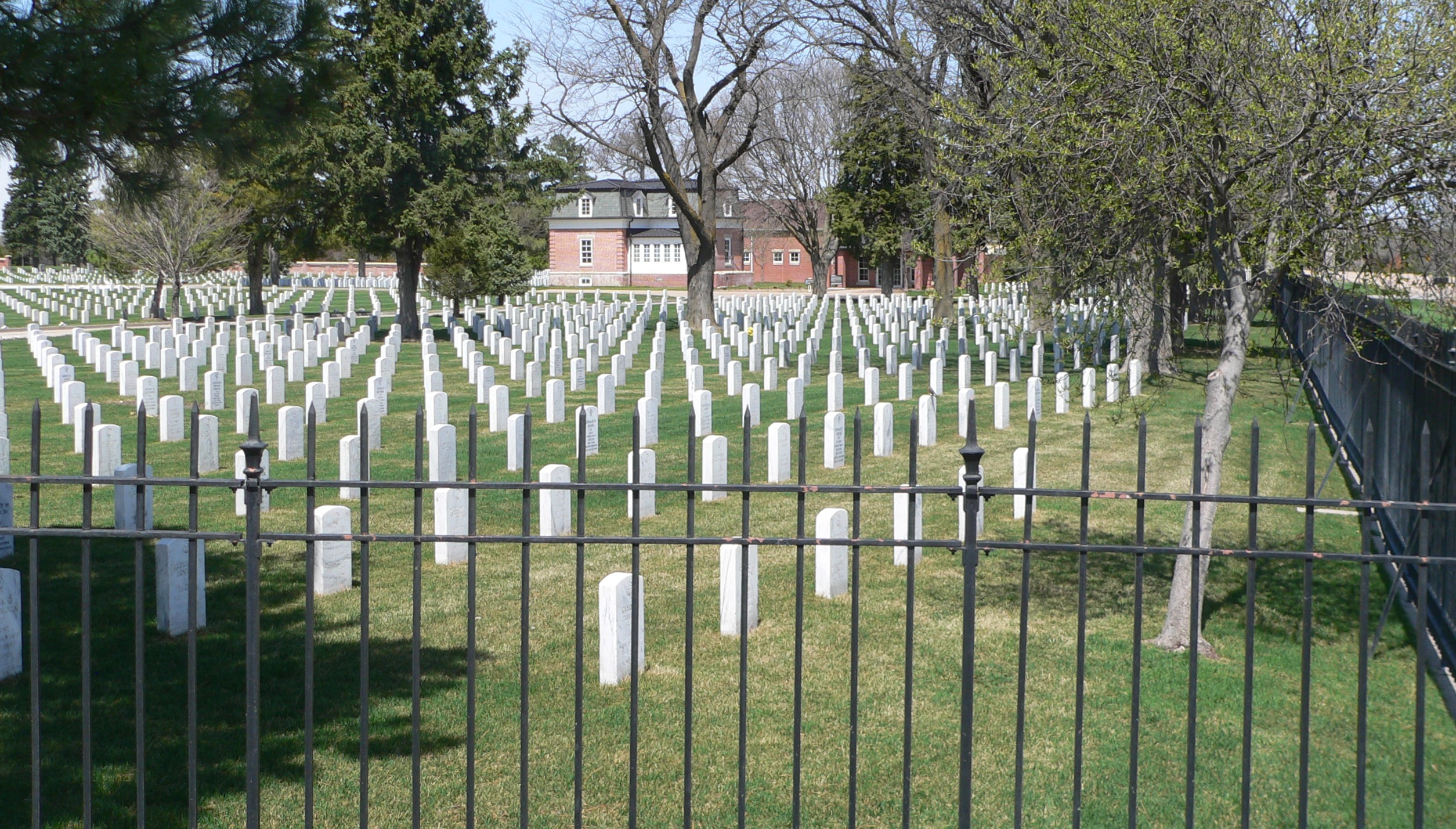
- Fort McPherson National Cemetery.
- Interactive map of Fort McPherson National Cemetery

Details
- Established: 1863
- Location: Lincoln County, Nebraska
- Country: United States
- Coordinates: 41°01′31″N 100°31′32″W
- Type: United States National Cemetery
- Size: 20 acres (8.1 ha)
- No. of graves: 10,000+
- Fort McPherson National Cemetery
- U.S. National Register of Historic Places
- Location: 12004 S. Spur 56A; Maxwell, Nebraska
- NRHP reference No.: 12000075
- Added to NRHP: March 7, 2012
- Website: Fort McPherson National Cemetery

Fort McPherson National Cemetery is a United States National Cemetery, located 4 miles (6 km) south of the village of Maxwell in Lincoln County, Nebraska. Administered by the United States Department of Veterans Affairs, it encompasses 20 acres (8.1 ha), and as of 2014, it had over 10,000 interments.

== History ==
Fort McPherson, Originally called Cantonment McKean, was established in 1863 as an outpost to protect travellers along the Oregon and California Trails, and to keep the peace with the local Native Americans. In 1866, it was renamed for Major General James B. McPherson, who was killed in action at the Battle of Atlanta in 1864. A cemetery was created along with the fort. In 1873, 20 acres (8.1 ha) were set aside to be a National Cemetery, and the remains interred in the original post cemetery were moved to it.

Twenty-three cemeteries were moved from abandoned frontier forts to Fort McPherson; the last of these was moved from Fort Robinson when it was closed in 1947.

== Monuments ==
- A marble monument, erected in memory of those killed at the Grattan massacre.

== Notable interments ==
- Medal of Honor recipients
  - Private First Class James W. Fous (1946–1968 †), for action in the Vietnam War
  - Sergeant George Jordan (1847–1904), for action in New Mexico Territory during the Indian Wars
  - Private Daniel Miller (1841–1874), for action in Arizona Territory during the Indian Wars
  - Sergeant Emanuel Stance (1843–1887), for action in Texas during the Indian Wars
- Others
  - California Joe Milner (1829–1876), Western miner and frontier scout
  - 63 Buffalo soldiers
