= 9th Cavalry Regiment (United States) =

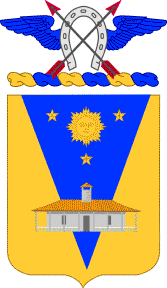
- 9th Cavalry Regiment coat of arms
- Active: 1866–1944; 1950–1956 (as 509th Tank Battalion); 1957–present (as parent regiment)
- Country: United States
- Branch: United States Army
- Type: Cavalry
- Size: Regiment
- Nickname: "Buffalo Soldiers"
- Mottos: "We Can, We Will"
- Engagements: Indian Wars; San Elizario Salt War; Spanish–American War; Philippine–American War; Vietnam War; United States invasion of Panama; Iraq War; Operation Inherent Resolve

Commanders
- Notable commanders: Edward Anderson; Edward Hatch; Adna Chaffee

Insignia
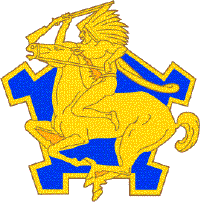
- Regimental distinctive insignia

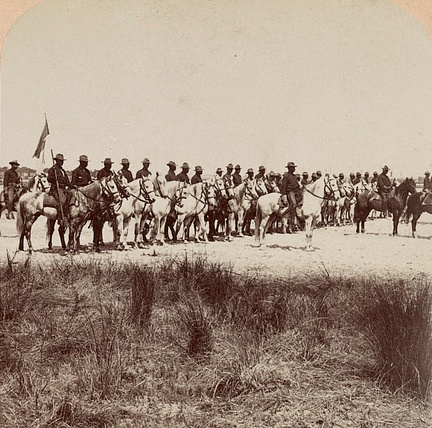
Troop A, 9th U.S. Cavalry, 1898

The 9th Cavalry Regiment is a parent cavalry regiment of the United States Army. Historically, it was one of the Army's four segregated African-American regiments and was part of what was known as the Buffalo Soldiers. The regiment saw combat during the Indian and Spanish–American Wars. During Westward Expansion, the regiment provided escort for the early western settlers and maintained peace on the American frontier.

As of 2019, the 1st Battalion and 4th Squadron serve with the 2nd Brigade Combat Team, 1st Cavalry Division as a combined arms battalion and an armored reconnaissance squadron, while the 6th Squadron is the armored reconnaissance squadron of the 3rd Brigade Combat Team of the division. All three units are stationed at Fort Hood.

== Formation ==
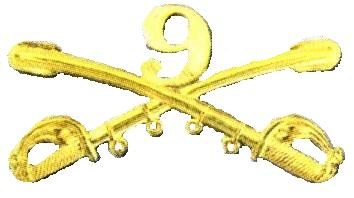
9th Cavalry insignia

The regiment was authorized on 28 July 1866 to become the 9th United States Cavalry Regiment. On 3 August 1866, Major General Philip H. Sheridan, commanding the Military Division of the Gulf, was "authorized to raise, among others, one regiment of colored (African-American) cavalry to be designated the 9th Regiment of U.S. Cavalry".

The regiment was formally organized on 21 September 1866 in New Orleans, Louisiana, and mustered between September 1866 and 31 March 1867. Its first commanding officer was Colonel Edward Hatch. The men enlisted for the usual term of five years and privates received $13 per month, plus room, meals, and clothing. They gained the nickname of "Buffalo Soldiers". The regiment's motto is "We Can, We Will".

The mustering, organized by Maj. Francis Moore, 65th U. S. Colored Infantry, formed the nucleus of the enlisted strength, and was obtained from New Orleans and its vicinity. In the autumn of 1866 recruiting began in Kentucky, and all the men of the 9th were obtained from that state and Louisiana. The horses were obtained at St. Louis, Missouri. About the middle of September all recruits were assembled in New Orleans, where empty cotton presses were used as barracks. An epidemic of cholera caused 29 soldiers' deaths between October and December, with 46 other soldiers deserting by the end of March 1867. The camp was moved to Carrollton, a suburb of New Orleans. Officer positions did not begin to be fully staffed until February 1867. By the end of March 1867, the 9th Cavalry was at nearly full strength with a total of 885 enlisted men, or an average of over 70 to a Troop, and was ordered to San Antonio, Texas, where it arrived early in April for three months of training. However, Troops L and M went directly to their duty station at Brownsville, Texas.

In April 1867, violent altercations between officers and soldiers occurred in Lieutenant Edward Heyl's Troop E and Lieutenant Fred Smith's Troop K near San Antonio as a result of poor morale and poor leadership. Sergeant Harrison Bradford and Lieutenant Seth E. Griffin died and 10 soldiers deserted from E Troop. The men at this point still had not been introduced to the Articles of War, and two soldiers convicted to death were pardoned and restored to duty.

== Service ==
=== Indian wars ===
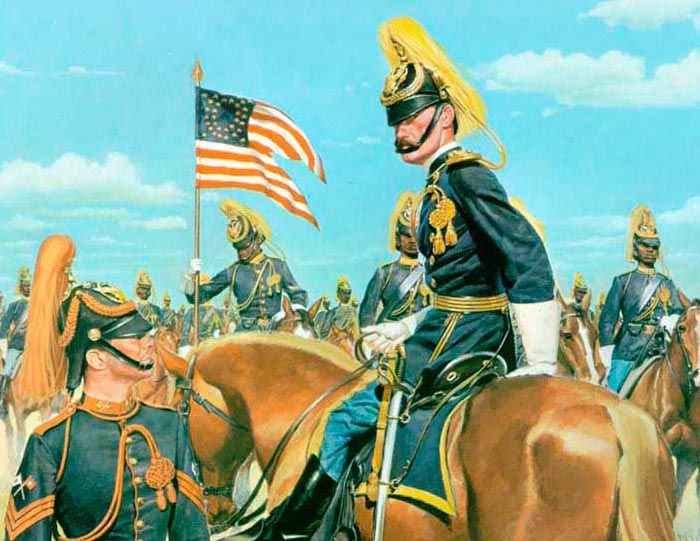
Captain and troopers of the 9th Cavalry, 1880. A Signal Corps sergeant is in the foreground.

In July 1867 the 9th Cavalry was ordered to western and southwestern Texas, to maintain law and order between the Rio Grande and Concho Rivers along a 630-mile line with seven forts from Fort Clark to Fort Quitman near present-day El Paso (the forts ended up including Fort Quitman, Fort Davis, Fort Stockton, Fort Lancaster, Fort Clark, Fort Duncan, Fort McKavett, and Fort Concho). Regimental Headquarters and Troops A, B, E and K, under Col. Hatch, were stationed at Fort Stockton; Troops C, D, F, G, H and I, under Lt. Col. Wesley Merritt were at Fort Davis. Troops L and M under 1st Lt. Hamilton had previously been sent to Brownsville. The 9th remained in Texas for eight years, nearly all of it in the field. While in Texas, the troops battled intermittently with Apaches, Kiowas, and Comanches, escorted mail, and rescued civilians from Native American captivity. On 26 December 1867, K Troop lost three troopers at Fort Lancaster in an encounter with an estimated force of 900 Native Americans and white outlaws.

The regiment next went to the New Mexico Military District, which covered parts of New Mexico, Colorado, and Texas, participating in the Apache Wars between 1875 and 1881. Headquarters were at Fort Union. While in New Mexico, their duties included constructing barracks and stables, caring for the horses, scouting for hostile Native Americans, escorting the mail, surveying uncharted land, and constructing roads. That service also included the Battle of Tularosa with Chiricahua Apache warriors led by Victorio in May 1880.

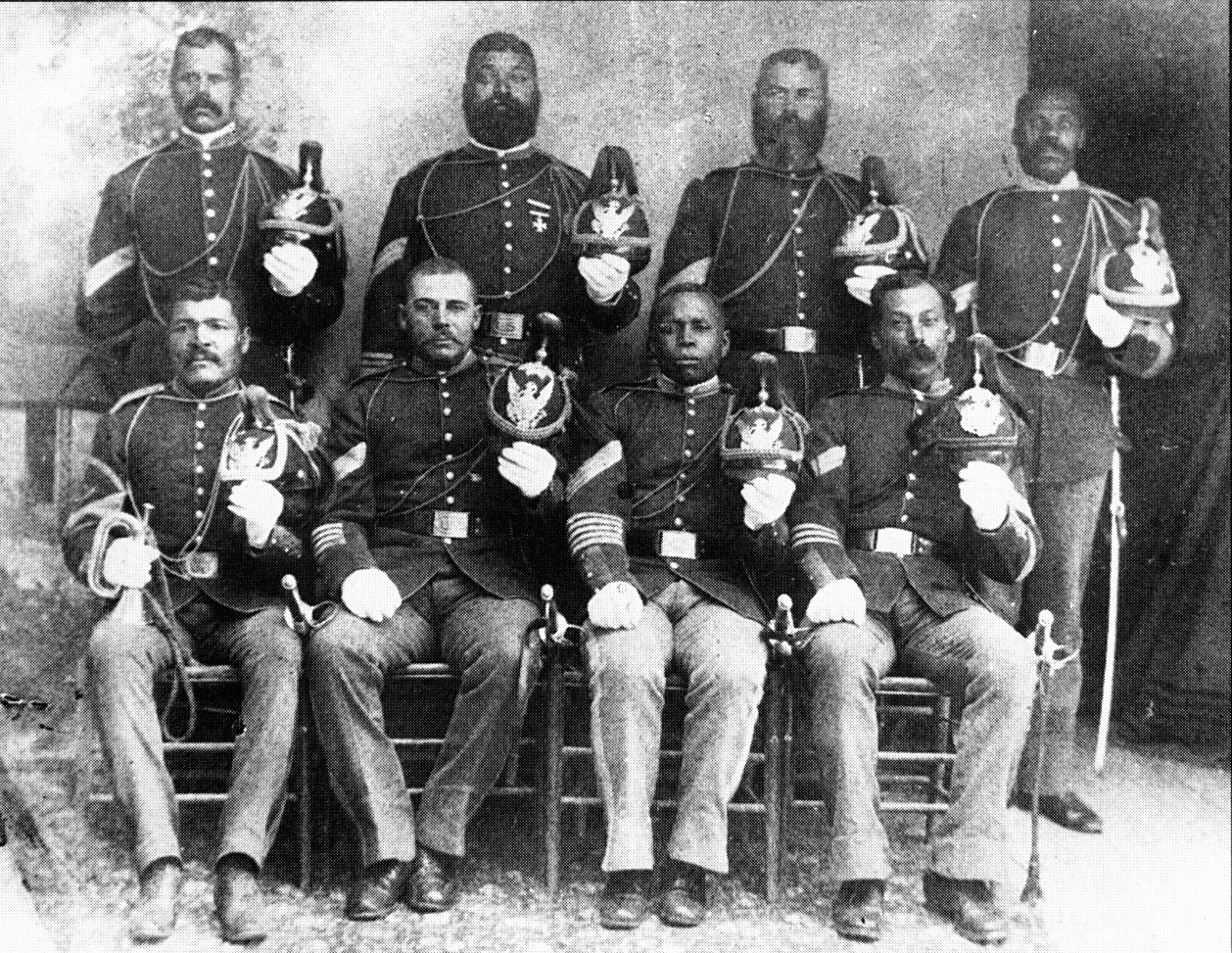
Colored non-commissioned officers from the United States Army's 9th Cavalry Regiment (Buffalo Soldiers), Fort Robinson, Nebraska, in 1889

In 1881 the 9th Cavalry was transferred to Fort Riley, Kansas, and to Fort Robinson, Nebraska, in 1885.

On 5 November 1887, Company H, of the 9th Cavalry fought in the Battle of Crow Agency during the Crow War, in Montana.

The regiment also patrolled during the Ghost Dance War with the Sioux about the time of the Wounded Knee Massacre and was the last regiment to leave the Pine Ridge Reservation in the Winter of 1890–1891, after the massacre.

=== Range wars ===
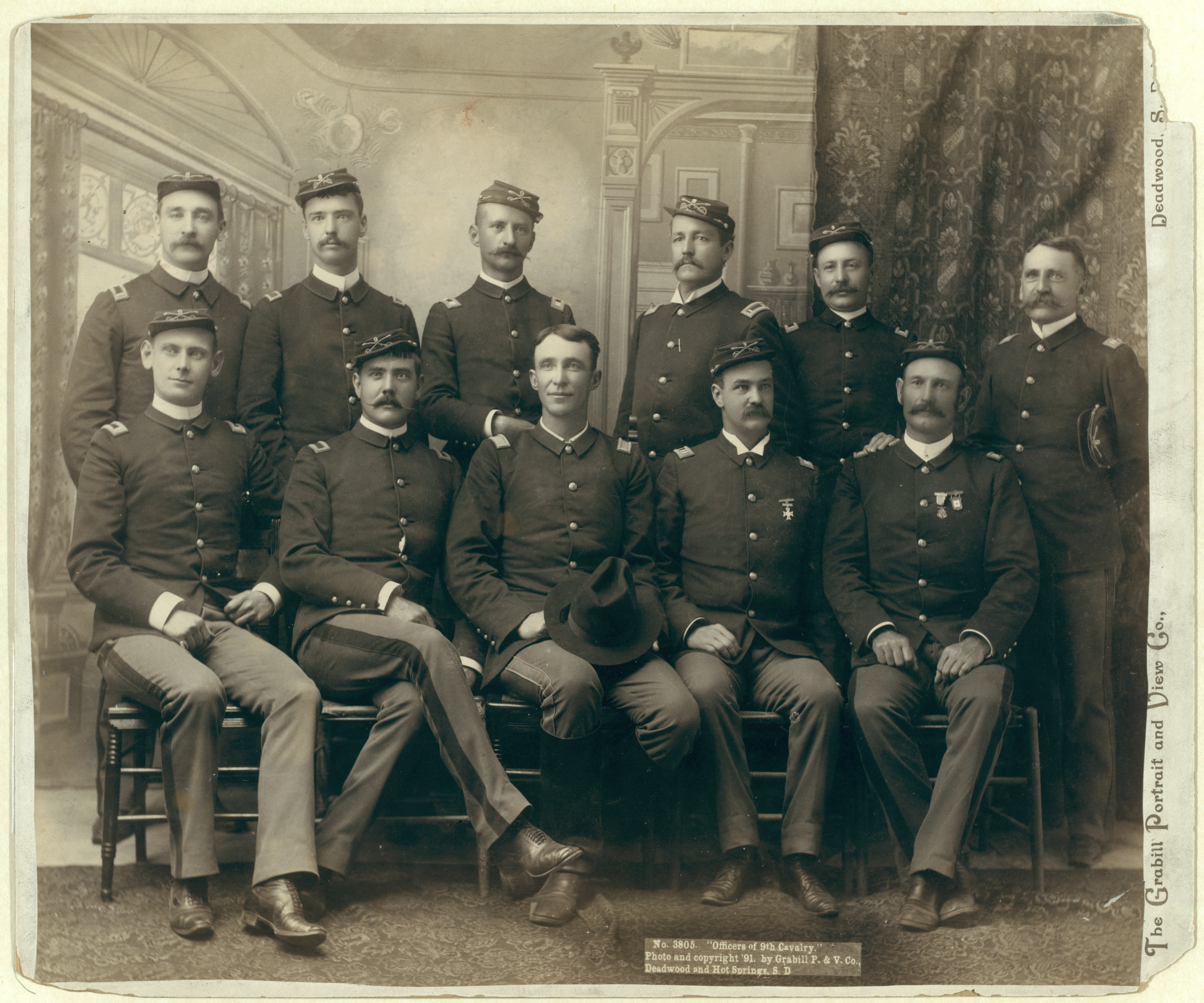
White Officers of the 9th Cavalry. Photograph by John C. H.Grabill, Deadwood, South Dakota 1891

The 9th Cavalry Regiment participated in two of the largest range conflicts in the American Old West. Range wars were battles fought between large cattle ranchers against smaller ranchers and farmers who competed for land, water, and livestock in the open range. Many of these conflicts resulted in military intervention to pacify and maintain peace. The 9th Cavalry's participated in the Colfax County War in Colfax County, New Mexico in 1873. Buffalo soldiers were among the units sent, and on one occasion, some of them had a shootout with a group of Texas cowboys in the St. James Hotel. On March 24, 1876, Three soldiers (Privates George Small, Anthony Harvey, and John Hanson, were killed and an unnamed trooper was wounded) died during the shootout and a few months later one of the cowboys, Davy Crockett, who was involved, was killed by the local sheriffs. One garbled version of the triple shooting had gunfighter Clay Allison shot and killed a black sergeant and four soldiers in a bar where he was drinking. Allison was arrested but released when it could not be proved he had been involved in the shooting.

The 9th cavalry had a much larger participation in the fabled Johnson County War in Johnson County, Wyoming. It culminated in a lengthy shootout between local farmers, a band of hired killers, and a sheriff's posse. The 6th Cavalry was ordered in by President Benjamin Harrison to quell the violence and capture the band of hired killers. Soon afterward, the 9th Cavalry was specifically called on to replace the 6th. The 6th Cavalry was swaying under the local political and social pressures and was unable to keep the peace in the tense environment. The Buffalo Soldiers responded within about two weeks from Nebraska, and moved the men to the rail town of Suggs, Wyoming, creating "Camp Bettens" despite a hostile local population. One soldier was killed and two wounded in a gun battle with locals. The 9th Cavalry remained in Wyoming for nearly a year to quell tensions in the area.

In 1886, members of the 9th cavalry constructed a road and telegraph line through Ninemile Canyon in Utah, connecting Fort Duchesne and the Uintah Basin to the region around Price, Utah.

=== Spanish–American War through WW1 ===
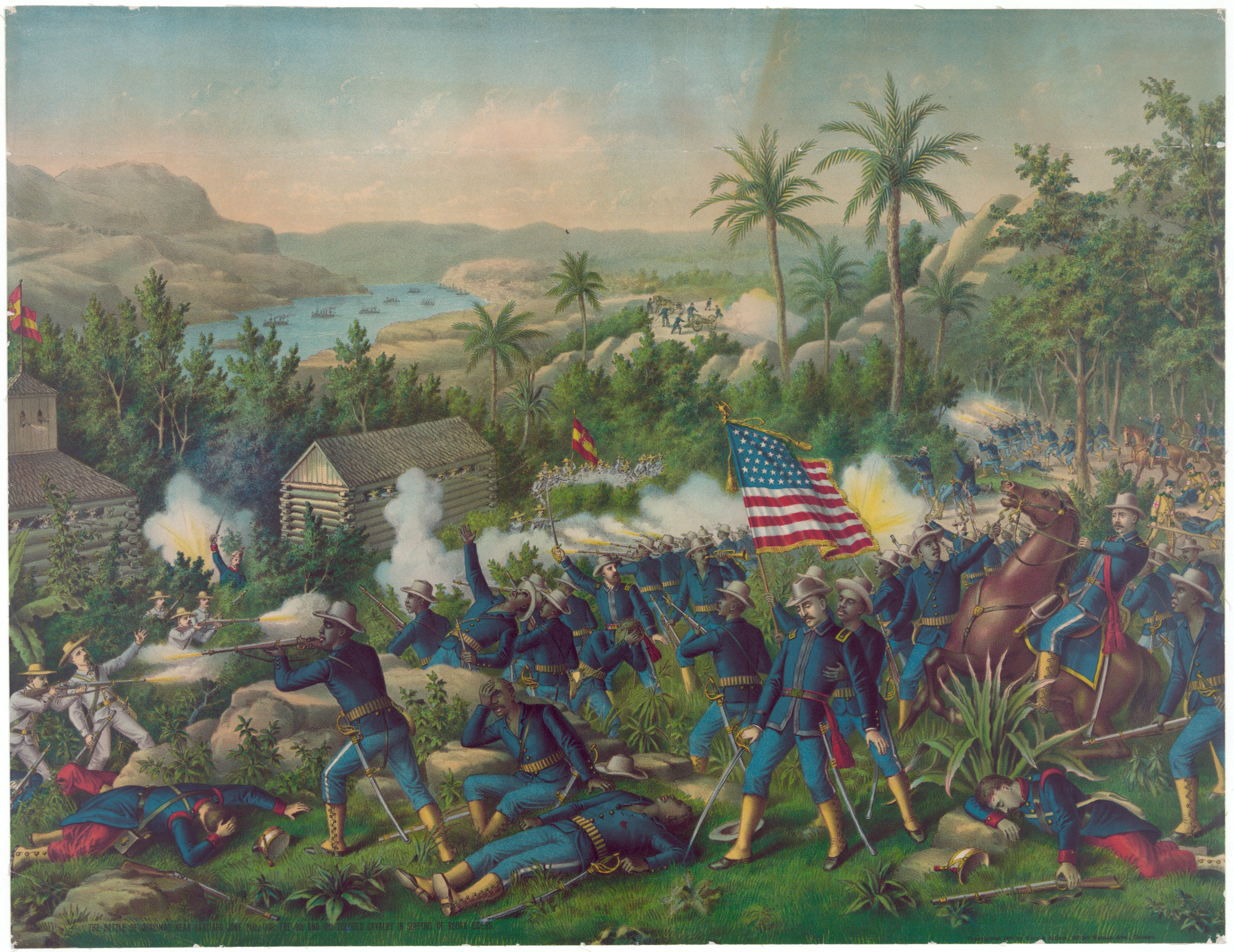
The 9th and 10th cavalry in the Battle of Las Guasimas, Cuba, 1898.

In 1898, the 9th US Cavalry Regiment fought alongside Theodore Roosevelt's Rough Riders at the battles of Kettle Hill and San Juan Hill. Later, they served as his honor guard during his visit to San Francisco.

In 1899 and again in 1904, the 9th Cavalry patrolled Yosemite National Park, joining other soldiers as the first "rangers" of the park system.

Under General John J. Pershing, the regiment fought in the Punitive Expedition against Pancho Villa in Mexico in 1916.

==== West Point ====
On 23 March 1907, the United States Military Academy Detachment of Cavalry was changed to a "colored" unit. This had been a long time coming. It had been proposed in 1897 at the "Cavalry and Light Artillery School" at Fort Riley that West Point cadets learn their riding skills from the black non-commissioned officers who were considered among the best. The one hundred man detachment from the 9th Cavalry served to teach future officers at West Point riding instruction, mounted drill and cavalry tactics until 1947.

=== Interwar period ===
The 9th Cavalry was stationed at Camp Stotsenburg, Philippines, as of June 1919. From 3 April 1921 to 11 October 1922, Brigadier General Edward Anderson commanded the regiment. The regiment departed Manila on 12 October 1922 on the troopship USAT Logan and arrived on 11 November 1922 at San Francisco, California. It was transferred to Fort Riley, and arrived there on 15 November 1922. The regiment absorbed just over 200 troopers of the Cavalry School Detachment (Colored) on 1 December 1922. From 1922 to 1940, the regiment served as the Cavalry School support and demonstration regiment. It was assigned to the 3rd Cavalry Division on 18 August 1933. It supported and supervised the training of the Colored Citizens Military Training Camps at Fort Riley from 1934 to 1936 and in 1938. It was relieved from the 3rd Cavalry Division on 10 October 1940 and assigned to the 2nd Cavalry Division.

=== World War II ===
The regiment did not end up serving in World War II as a unit, and was transferred to the Mediterranean with the rest of the 2nd Cavalry Division in order to supply soldiers for other units. The regiment was inactivated on 7 March 1944 in North Africa.

=== Cold War ===
The regiment was redesignated as the 509th Tank Battalion on 20 October 1950 and relieved from its assignment to the 2nd Cavalry Division. The battalion was activated at Camp Polk, Louisiana on 1 November of that year and inactivated at Fort Knox on 10 April 1956. The regiment was reorganized and redesignated as the 9th Cavalry on 1 December 1957, becoming a parent regiment under the Combat Arms Regimental System.

The 1st Reconnaissance Squadron, 9th Cavalry was assigned to the 1st Cavalry Division in Korea and activated on 1 November 1957 from the 1st Cavalry Division's 16th Reconnaissance Company as the division reconnaissance squadron. It became 1st Squadron, 9th Cavalry (1-9 Cavalry) on 1 September 1963, and was transferred to Fort Benning on 1 July 1965 without personnel and equipment to become an experimental air cavalry unit, reflagged from the 3rd Squadron, 17th Cavalry of the 11th Air Assault Division (Test). The former 1-9 Cavalry in Korea became 4th Squadron, 7th Cavalry of the 2nd Infantry Division.

The 2nd Reconnaissance Squadron, 9th Cavalry was assigned to the 9th Infantry Division at Fort Carson and activated on 1 December 1957 from its 9th Reconnaissance Company as the division reconnaissance squadron. It was transferred to the 24th Infantry Division and reorganized in Europe on 1 July 1958, stationed at Augsburg. The squadron became the 2nd Squadron, 9th Cavalry (2-9 Cavalry) on 1 September 1963.

The 3rd Reconnaissance Squadron, 9th Cavalry was assigned to the Army Reserve and activated on 6 April 1959 at Philadelphia, Pennsylvania as the divisional reconnaissance squadron of the 79th Infantry Division. The squadron was inactivated there on 28 February 1963 when the 79th was reduced to a headquarters. It was redesignated as Troop C, 9th Cavalry and reactivated on 1 February 1964 at Bristol with the 157th Infantry Brigade. The troop was moved to Wilkes-Barre on 31 January 1966. The troop continued to serve with the 157th Infantry Brigade (Mech) until deactivation on 20 August 1995.

The 4th Reconnaissance Squadron, 9th Cavalry was assigned to the Army Reserve and activated on 20 March 1959 at Mansfield, Ohio as the divisional reconnaissance squadron of the 83rd Infantry Division. The squadron became the 4th Squadron, 9th Cavalry (4-9 Cavalry) on 15 April 1963, but was inactivated on 31 December 1965. On 24 November 1967 it was reactivated as a Regular Army unit with the 6th Infantry Division at Fort Campbell. The squadron was reactivated in April, 1986, at Ladd Army Airfield, Hangar 2, Fort Wainwright, Alaska, with the 6th Infantry Division, where it served during the later years of the Cold War.

The 5th Squadron, 9th Cavalry (5-9 Cavalry) was activated on 21 December 1962 at Fort Ord with the 194th Armored Brigade. 5-9 Cavalry was inactivated there on 4 January 1968, redesignated as Troop E, 9th Cavalry, and simultaneously reactivated at Fort Ord as a nondivisional unit.

==== Vietnam War (Air Cav) ====
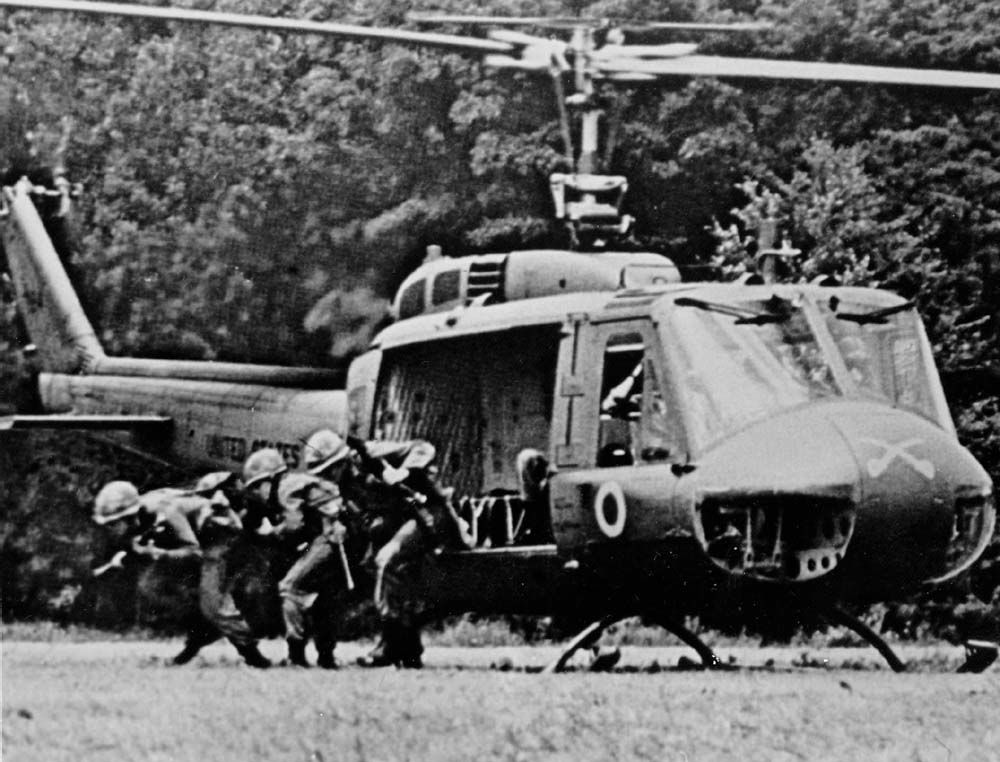
A rifle squad from the 1st Squadron, 9th Cavalry exiting from a UH-1D

The then-experimental 1-9 Air Cav ushered in a new era of combat called air assault. These teams were composed of aero-weapons (Reds), aero-scout (Whites), and aero-rifle (Blues). Together, ground (D Troop) and air reconnaissance teams patrolled the Vietnam countryside in search of the enemy. Once located, the infantry (Blues) would insert (and extract) via helicopter or foot to engage the enemy with support of their aero scouts and aero weapons. These teams earned the nickname of "Headhunters." This concept differed from conventional front line warfare typical in prior land warfare.

On 5 December 1970, 9th Air Cavalry Brigade (Provisional) was formed by 1 Cavalry as an ad hoc brigade and organized by operations order OPORD 1-70 consisting of:

- 1/9 Cavalry
  - HQ Troop, A, B, C, D, E,& F Troops
- 3/17 Cavalry
  - HQ Troop and A, B & E Troops

The brigade was responsible for 5,976 square miles.

During the Vietnam war, the 1st of the 9th Cavalry earned 3 Presidential Unit Citations and 5 Valorous Unit Citations. It was inactivated on 26 February 1973 and was one of the last conventional units to leave Vietnam. In 1971, as the 1st Cavalry Division began redeployment to the United States, Troop F, 9th Cavalry was formed from one platoon each from the 1-8 Cavalry, 2-5 Cavalry, 1-12 Cavalry and 1-7 Cavalry. This unit operated independently of the 1-9 Cavalry. Troop F was inactivated in Vietnam on 26 February 1973.

==== 1976 to 1986 ====
The 2d Squadron, 9th Cavalry was assigned to the far end of the runways at Hunter Army Air Field (HAAF) as an Air Cav Unit (under the 24th Infantry). In 1977 D-Troop attended the Jungle Operations Training Center program at Fort Sherman, Panama Canal with one medic from the HHT. In 1977 the HHT, A-Troop, B-Troop were moved 40 miles away to Fort Stewart where it was re-designated as an Air and Armored Cavalry. D-Troop remained at HAAF during this time. While D-Troop maintained the Rotary Wings Aircraft and Cavalry Recon Scouts (Airmobile – Air Assault group), A-Troop was given armored personnel carriers (APC) and B-Troop had many of the larger track vehicles. HHT had APC's for the medical section and S1-S3. The medics continued to maintain two gamma-goats, but received two new APC's – one 577 command track and 113 ambulance. The 2nd Squadron, 9th Cavalry remained a part of the 24th Infantry at Fort Stewart and HAAF until 1986 when the unit was re-designated the 2nd Squadron, 4th Cavalry.

=== Return to Fort Hood, Texas ===
After Vietnam, the Squadron returned to Fort Hood, Texas with the rest of the 1st Cavalry Division and served as divisional recon squadron until 16 October 1986, when it was inactivated. On 25 November 1992, the 1st Squadron, 9th Cavalry was reactivated, reorganized as a mechanized infantry battalion, re-designated as the 1st Battalion, 9th Cavalry and assigned to the 1st Cavalry Division as part of the 3rd Brigade.

=== Brigade Reconnaissance, Fort Lewis, Washington ===
On 16 March 1987, the 1st Squadron, 9th Cavalry was moved to Fort Lewis, Washington, and was assigned to the 9th Infantry Division (Motorized) as the divisional reconnaissance squadron. In 1991 the squadron was inactivated along with the rest of the 9th Infantry Division. The unit was reflagged as Alpha Troop, 9th U.S. Cavalry and assigned as brigade reconnaissance to the 199th Infantry Brigade. During the drawdown of the 9th Infantry Division at Fort Lewis in 1991–1992, a residual brigade, based around the division's 3rd Brigade, was briefly active as the 199th Infantry Brigade (Motorized) from 16 February 1991 before being reflagged on 16 July 1992 as the 2nd Armored Cavalry Regiment.

The structure of 199th Infantry Brigade at that time was:

199th Infantry Brigade (Motorized), Fort Lewis Headquarters and Headquarters Company (HHC) 1st Battalion, 29th Infantry(Possible) 1st Battalion, 33rd Armor[4] 2nd Battalion, 1st Infantry[5] 3rd Battalion, 47th Infantry[6] 1st Battalion, 11th Field Artillery[7] 99th Support Battalion (Forward) Troop A, 9th Cavalry (previously Troop B, 1st Squadron, 9th Cavalry, rest of the squadron disbanded on the same date) 102nd Engineer Company (Company D, 15th Engineer Battalion) 9th Chemical Company[8] Battery E, 44th Air Defense Artillery[9]

Alpha Troop, 9th Cavalry was assigned M996 HMMWVs and were organized into 4 scout platoons with 6 vehicles each. Two M-2 cal .50 MG trucks, two MK-19 grenade launcher trucks, and two M1036 TOW equipped vehicles. With the addition of a HQ platoon and supported by an organic mortar section equipped with 60mm mortars, and later upgraded to 120mm, Alpha Troop 9th Cavalry was a test for the wheeled vehicle brigade concept. This validation led to the organization of the Stryker Brigades years later.

=== Operation Just Cause; Panama ===
The 2d Squadron, 9th Cavalry, assigned to the 7th Infantry Division (Light), deployed to Panama (20 Dec 1989 – 31 Jan 1990) in order to conduct combat operations during Operation Just Cause and the ensuing humanitarian and nation building mission Operation Promote Liberty. The Air Troops were the first to deploy with their AH-1 Cobra attack helicopters and their OH-59 (OH-58 Kiowa) aerial scout helicopters. D Troop,2-9th Cavalry soon followed and conducted route clearance, zone reconnaissance, and provided support to U.S. Army units in the interior. The D 2nd Squadron, 9th Cavalry was stationed in Warner Kaserne Munich Germany 1962-1968 and Reforged to Ft. Riley Kansas in 1968.

=== Confronting Iraq in the 1990s ===
The 1st Battalion, 9th Cavalry was reconstituted as infantry from the highly decorated Persian Gulf War unit; 3-41 Infantry of the 2nd Armored Division in 1992 and assigned to the 3d Brigade of the 1st Cavalry Division. It served in combat as 3-41 Infantry of the Tiger Brigade in Operation Desert Storm. (As a side note, the Third Brigade was led by then Colonel George Casey Jr. and the 1st Cavalry Division was led by future Democratic presidential candidate General Wesley Clark Sr.)

1-9 Cavalry deployed abroad several times in the decade; to thwart aggressive and hostile maneuvers of the Iraqi Army. Most notably in Operation Intrinsic Action and Iris Gold. 1-9 Cavalry was designated as the military operations in urban terrain (MOUT) unit of the 1st Cavalry Division.

Following is a brief rendition of significant events during this time period.

1993:

- Three soldiers killed on Lone Star North Range.
- NTC deployment.
- Intrinsic Action I deployment to S.W. Asia.
- Operation Iris Gold (Combat patch authorized)

1994:

- Claymore mine accident severely injured a 1st lieutenant from Company A.
- Cambrian Patrol (special operations competitive patrol in England) set range live fire record (Company E).
- Two soldiers from Company E killed.

1995:

- Two soldiers from HHC killed.
- Soldier injured by grenade blast at tire house.

1996:

- Intrinsic Action II deployment to SW Asia.

2000

- E Troop 9th Cav was reconstituted (Fort Stewart Ga.) under the leadership of Capt. John Cushing and 1st Sgt. Richard F. Denny (Brigade Recon Team)

== 21st century ==
Today, the units of the 9th United States Cavalry Regiment provide RSTA (reconnaissance, surveillance, and target acquisition) capabilities forward of enemy lines and supply infantrymen as sniper and long range surveillance teams for use as special reconnaissance in the area of combat operations.

These small Army reconnaissance units, provide valuable real-time intelligence about an enemy nation, including its leaders, combat capabilities etc. Gathered intelligence Information is fed into various intelligence agency assets and databases including the national target base.

The 9th United States Cavalry units fought against both the armed conventional and unconventional enemies in the decade-long "Global War on Terror" in both the Afghanistan and Iraq theaters. They developed and tested many new military doctrines and tactics when searching for, locating, observing and destroying the insurgent enemy and their war fighting assets, just as they had during the Indian, Spanish-American and Vietnam Wars.

The unit has received numerous Presidential Unit Citations and Valorous Unit Awards as well as decorations for individual valor have been awarded to the 9th United States Cavalry Regiment and her combat soldiers.

=== Troop B ===
Troop B ("Bloody Knife"), 9th Cavalry, 3rd Brigade, 4th Infantry Division, was deployed from Fort Carson, Colorado, to Iraq in April 2003. After arriving at Camp Wolfe, Kuwait the unit moved to Camp New Jersey in Northern Kuwait. The lead elements of the Brigade Reconnaissance Troop (BRT) then crossed into Iraq, covering a distance of over 300 kilometers. This combat operation was the first for the 4th Infantry Division since Vietnam. The BRT has operated in Samarra East Airfield, Samarra, Ad Dawr, Tikrit East, Tuz Khurmat, Jalula, MEK, Daquq, Kirkuk, Taza Khormatu, Al Huwayjah, Ad Duluyah, At Tarmyia, Ad Dujayl, and Balad South.

On 23 October 2003, the soldiers of Troop B-9th Cavalry were issued their combat patches (e.g., the authorization to wear the division patch on the right shoulder) for conducting combat operations in support of Operation Enduring Freedom and Operation Iraqi Freedom. The troop consisted of two platoons of scouts and one platoon of COLT (Combat Observation Lasing Teams). The unit deployed under the command of CPT William Sachse and redeployed under the command of CPT Clinton Fuller. The Bloody Knife Troop became the quick reaction force for one of the largest logistics bases in Iraq while still conducting operations where ever the brigade needed them. The Bloody Knife Troop was one of the last reconnaissance troops to fall directly under a brigade headquarters.

=== 1st Battalion ===
The 1st Battalion, 9th Cavalry Regiment (1-9th Cav), is stationed at Fort Hood, Texas, as a combined arms battalion the 2nd Brigade Combat Team, 1st Cavalry Division. Originally part of the 3rd BCT at Fort Hood, the "1st of the 9th" moved to Fort Bliss to fill the RSTA (reconnaissance, surveillance, and target acquisition) needs of the newly created 4th BCT in October 2005. The unit is nicknamed the "Headhunters". The unit was featured as the command of LTC Bill Kilgore in the classic Vietnam War movie Apocalypse Now.

The 1st Squadron, 9th Cavalry Regiment (1-9th Cav), began deployment to Iraq in September 2003 in support of Operation Iraqi Freedom. Headquarters & Headquarters Troop (HHT) and Troop C, 1-9th Cav were assigned an Army National Guard infantry unit (Company C, 1st Battalion, 153rd Infantry, ARNG), a combat engineer unit (Company A, 8th Engineers), a support unit (215) and a civil support unit to comprise Task Force 1-9 (TF HEADHUNTER). Companies A and B, 1-9th Cav, were assigned to other task forces in Iraq, notably Task Force All American (TF-AA). During their first deployment, 124 Purple Heart medals were awarded to Task Force 1-9 soldiers, who operated in one of the most dangerous sections of Iraq, including the 2004 Battles of Sadr City and Haifa street.

In October 2006, the 1st Squadron, 9th Cavalry Regiment, began its second deployment to Iraq from Fort Bliss, Texas, in support of Operation Iraqi Freedom, along with the rest of 4th Brigade Combat Team, 1st Cavalry Division, to work alongside units of the 25th Infantry Division to comprise Task Force Lightning. The Area of Operations for 1-9 CAV during the 06-08 OIF rotation was Mosul, Iraq in the Nineveh Province. After a seven-month duration of operations 1-9 CAV conducted an intra-theater deployment from Mosul to Tal Afar replacing 3/4 CAV for eight months to complete a 15-month rotation. The unit was awarded the Valorous Unit Award during this deployment.

In March 2008, 8th Squadron, 10th Cavalry of the 4th Infantry Division was reflagged as the 1st Squadron, 9th Cavalry, part of the 4th Brigade Combat Team, 1st Cavalry Division. In June 2008, 1-9th Cav deployed to OIF 08–10 to CSC SCANIA and assumed responsibilities for MSR TAMPA and the cities of Hamza, Qasim, Hashimiyah, Ash Shumali and other smaller towns from 3rd Squadron, 73rd Cavalry of the 1st Brigade Combat Team, 82nd Airborne Division. In August 2008, 1-9th Cav was given orders to build a forward operating base (FOB) along the Iranian border in order to interdict lethal accelerants from being smuggled. The base is known as FOB Hunter and is in the Maysan province which resides in the marsh lands of Iraq.

=== 2nd Squadron ===
The 2nd Squadron, 9th Cavalry was stationed in Munich Germany 1963–1968. It was reassigned to Fort Riley, Kansas in 1968. During Operation Desert Storm, it served as the 24th Infantry Division's Divisional Cavalry Squadron and was based at Fort Stewart, Georgia. It was reflagged in 1996 to 3rd Squadron, 7th Cavalry when the 24th Infantry Division was reflagged to the 3rd Infantry Division. In 2003, it was reactivated at Fort Carson, Colorado as Troop B, 9th Cavalry and served as the Brigade Recon Troop for 3d Brigade, 4th Infantry Division during Operation Iraqi Freedom I. As part of the conversion to modular Brigade Combat Teams, Troop B was expanded back into an armored reconnaissance squadron for 3d Brigade. The squadron, nicknamed "Hunters", deployed in support of Operation Iraqi Freedom IV, serving in two provinces: first in Salah ad-Din near ad-Dawr, first as an attachment to the 3rd Brigade, 101st Airborne Division, and then in Diyala with the rest of the 3rd Brigade, 4th Infantry Division, after handing over the base in ad-Dawr to A "Gators" Battery, 1st Battalion, 319th Field Artillery Regiment of the 3rd BCT, 82d Airborne Division, and the Iraqi Army. The 2nd Squadron was inactivated on 18 October 2007, and reflagged as the 4th Squadron, 10th Cavalry Regiment (4-10th Cav).

=== 4th Squadron ===
The 4th Squadron, 9th Cavalry, "Darkhorse" is stationed at Fort Hood, Texas and is the armored reconnaissance squadron for the 2nd Brigade Combat Team, 1st Cavalry Division. During Operation Iraqi Freedom 06–08, the Darkhorse deployed with Black Jack to Baghdad, Iraq, where it secured the International Zone—the area of central Baghdad that is home to the U.S. Embassy, Iraqi Council of Representatives, and numerous other Iraqi and Coalition governmental offices. The squadron's responsibilities were later expanded to conduct counterinsurgency operations throughout the Karkh District.

In 2009 the squadron again deployed to Iraq, this time to Kirkuk Province for OIF 09–10, where it was responsible for the security, stability, and reconstruction of the Daquq district and the Taza, Laylan, and Rashaad sub-districts. The squadron partnered with the 15th Iraqi Army Brigade and Iraqi police from each of its districts to conduct area security and stability operations for an operating environment of over 3,000 square kilometers. The squadron also helped to balance ethnic tensions through the training and equipping Iraqi security forces, improvement of essential services, and the support and promotion of the legitimate government.

In 2011 the squadron deployed a third time to Iraq, in support of Operation New Dawn.

In 2013 the squadron deployed to Afghanistan in support of Operation Enduring Freedom.

In 2015 the squadron deployed to The Republic of South Korea fornits first ever 9 month rotation.

In October 2019 the squadron deployed to Poland.

=== 5th Squadron ===
The 5th Squadron, 9th Cavalry, was reconstituted at Schofield Barracks, Hawaii, with headquarters at Wheeler Army Airfield. Its motto is "We can, we will". The unit consisted of one ground troop (A) and two air troops (B & C). Each air troop consisted of a scout platoon, flying the OH-58A+ Kiowa, and a gun platoon, flying the AH-1 Cobra. The squadron also had one UH-1 Huey. The squadron also maintained a dedicated Aviation Unit Maintenance (AVUM) element, Troop D, which provided maintenance support for the unit’s aircraft.

5th Battalion, 9th Cavalry Regiment re-flagged to become 3rd Squadron, 4th Cavalry Regiment on 15 February 1996.

=== 6th Squadron ===
The 6th Squadron, 9th Cavalry, is assigned to the 3rd Brigade Combat Team, 1st Cavalry Division, and is stationed at Fort Hood, Texas. 6th Squadron was redesignated on 17 October 2005 from Troop F, 3rd Brigade's Recon Troop for OIF II, reactivated at Fort Hood on 17 April 2003. The unit is nicknamed the "Saber Squadron". Coincidentally, the unit replaced the 2nd Squadron in Diyala when it deployed in October 2006 in support of Operation Iraqi Freedom 06–08, from which the last of the unit's soldiers returned on 18 December 2007.

6-9 Cav was one of the last units to have left Iraq along with the 3rd Brigade 1st Cavalry Division on 18 December 2011.

== Current status ==
- 1st Battalion is a Combined Arms Battalion (CAB) in the 2nd Brigade, 1st Cavalry Division stationed at Fort Hood, Texas.
- 4th Squadron is the armored reconnaissance squadron of the 2nd Brigade, 1st Cavalry Division stationed at Fort Hood, Texas.
- 6th Squadron is the armored reconnaissance squadron of the 3rd Brigade, 1st Cavalry Division stationed at Fort Hood, Texas.

== Notable members ==
- John H. Alexander, second African American graduate of West Point (commissioned in 1887).
- J. Franklin Bell, Chief of Staff of the Army (Medal of Honor recipient)
- Thomas Boyne (Medal of Honor recipient)
- Howlin' Wolf, also known as Chester Arthur Burnett, blues musician
- William Connelly, 6th Sergeant Major of the US Army
- Benjamin O. Davis Sr., first African-American general officer in the U.S. Army.
- Matthias W. Day, Medal of Honor recipient
- John Denny (Medal of Honor recipient)
- Robert Temple Emmet, Colonel of the regiment and Medal of Honor recipient.
- LTG Paul E. Funk, Commander of A Troop 1970. Commanded 3rd Armored Division in Desert Storm. Commanding General III Corps and Fort Hood.
- Clinton Greaves (Medal of Honor recipient)
- Henry Johnson (Indian Wars soldier), Medal of Honor recipient
- George Jordan, Medal of Honor recipient
- Elmer Keeton
- Thomas Shaw (Medal of Honor recipient)
- Gen. (Ret.) Robert M. Shoemaker
- Emanuel Stance (Medal of Honor recipient)
- Capt. Jon E. Swanson – B Troop 1-9 Air Cavalry 1971. The only OH-6A pilot recipient of the Medal of Honor.
- Augustus Walley (Medal of Honor recipient)
- Moses Williams (Medal of Honor recipient)
- Brent Woods (Medal of Honor recipient)
- Charles Young, third African American graduate of West Point (commissioned in 1889).

== Notes ==
Bibliography

- Banks, Herbert G. (2002). 1st Cavalry Division: A Spur Ride Through the 20th Century. Paducah, KY: Turner Publishing Company. ISBN 978-1-56311-785-5.
- Brennan, Matthew. Headhunters: Stories from the 1st Squadron, 9th Cavalry in Vietnam, 1965-1971. Novato, CA: Presidio, 1987. ISBN 0891413006 OCLC 15630963
- Christian, Garna L. Black Soldiers in Jim Crow Texas, 1899-1917. College Station : Texas A & M University Press, 1995. ISBN 0890966370 OCLC 31434080
- Davis, Henry Blaine Jr. Generals in Khaki. Raleigh, NC: Pentland Press, 1998. ISBN 1571970886 OCLC 231779136
- Kenner, Charles L. Buffalo Soldiers and Officers of the Ninth Cavalry, 1867-1898: Black & White Together. Norman: University of Oklahoma Press, 1999. ISBN 0806131586 OCLC 41565079
- Schubert, Frank N. (1997). Black Valor: Buffalo Soldiers and the Medal of Honor, 1870-1898. Scholarly Resources Inc. ISBN 9780842025867.
- Stubbs, Mary Lee; Connor, Stanley Russell (1969). Armor-Cavalry. Vol. Part I: Regular Army and Army Reserve. Washington, D.C.: Office of the Chief of Military History, United States Army. OCLC 30836003.
- Zahn, R (2003). Snake Pilot. USA: Brassey's Inc. ISBN 1-57488-565-0.
