= Thomas Boyne =

U.S. Army Medal of Honor recipient (1849-1896)

- Born: c. 1849; Prince George's County, Maryland, US
- Died: April 21, 1896 (aged 46–47); Washington, D.C., US
- Burial place: United States Soldiers' and Airmen's Home National Cemetery, Washington, D.C.
- Military career
- Allegiance: United States
- Branch: United States Army
- Service years: 1864-1889
- Rank: Sergeant
- Unit: 9th Cavalry Regiment
- Conflicts: American Civil War, American Indian Wars
- Awards: Medal of Honor

Thomas Boyne (c. 1849 – April 21, 1896) was a Buffalo Soldier in the United States Army and a recipient of America's highest military decoration—the Medal of Honor—for his actions in the Indian Wars of the western United States.

== Career ==
=== Civil War ===
Boyne was a native of Prince George's County, Maryland. First enlisting in the artillery in 1864, Boyne served with B Battery of the Second Colored Light Artillery in battles around Richmond (Wilson's Wharf and City Point, Virginia) during the Civil War in 1864.

=== Indian Wars ===
He was discharged in March 1866 near Brownsville, Texas, and ten months later, joined the 40th Infantry under the name Thomas Bowen. The 40th Infantry consolidated into the 25th Infantry, in which he served until 1875. In 1875, he joined the 9th Cavalry. Not even Emanuel Stance had as varied a military background as Boyne among the 9th Cavalry prior to the cavalry's pursuit of Chief Victorio in 1879.

In 1879, Boyne was serving as a Sergeant in Company C of the 9th Cavalry in New Mexico. His troop was in pursuit of Chief Victorio just prior to the Victorio's War. He was cited for "[b]ravery in action" at the Mimbres Mountains on May 29, 1879, and at the Cuchillo Negro River near Ojo Caliente on September 27, 1879. For those actions, Sergeant Boyne was awarded the Medal of Honor on January 6, 1882.

Boyne had participated in eight of his regiment's fourteen engagements with Apaches when he initiated his request for a medal in 1880. His original request was for a Certificate of Merit, the award of which came with an increase in pay. Congress was only authorized to award one such award (either the Certificate or the Medal of Honor) and a legislative protocol reserved Certificates to private soldiers and Medals of Honor to officers.

=== Later career and death ===
Boyne assisted the cavalry in removing Sooners from native lands in Oklahoma and endured frostbite in the winter of 1884-1885 as a result. Boyne reenlisted into the 25th Infantry in July 1885 and was stationed in the Black Hills of the Dakota Territory. He developed a hernia in Montana in 1888 while supervising a wood-gathering detail and the Army discharged him in January 1889 with a disability pension. Boyne moved into the U.S. Soldiers' Home and died on April 21, 1896, of consumption. Boyne was buried at the United States Soldiers' and Airmen's Home National Cemetery in Washington, D.C.

== Medal of Honor citation ==
Rank and organization: Sergeant, Company C, 9th U.S. Cavalry. Place and date: At Mimbres Mountains, N. Mex., May 29, 1879; at Cuchillo Negro River near Ojo Caliente, N. Mex., September 27, 1879. Entered service at:------. Birth: Prince George's County, Md. Date of issue: January 6, 1882.

Citation:

Bravery in action.

== See also ==
- List of Medal of Honor recipients
- List of Medal of Honor recipients for the Indian Wars
- List of African American Medal of Honor recipients
