= Emanuel Stance =

Buffalo Soldier in the U.S. Army (1843–1887)

- Born: 1843; Carroll Parish, Louisiana
- Died: December 24, 1887 (aged 43–44); Nebraska
- Burial place: Fort McPherson National Cemetery; Maxwell, Nebraska
- Military career
- Allegiance: United States of America
- Branch: United States Army
- Service years: 1866 - 1887
- Rank: First Sergeant
- Unit: 9th Cavalry Regiment
- Conflicts: American Indian Wars
- Awards: Medal of Honor

Emanuel Stance (1843 – December 25, 1887), also known as Edmund Stance, was a Buffalo Soldier in the United States Army and a recipient of America's highest military decoration—the Medal of Honor—for his actions in the Indian Wars of the western United States.

== Career ==
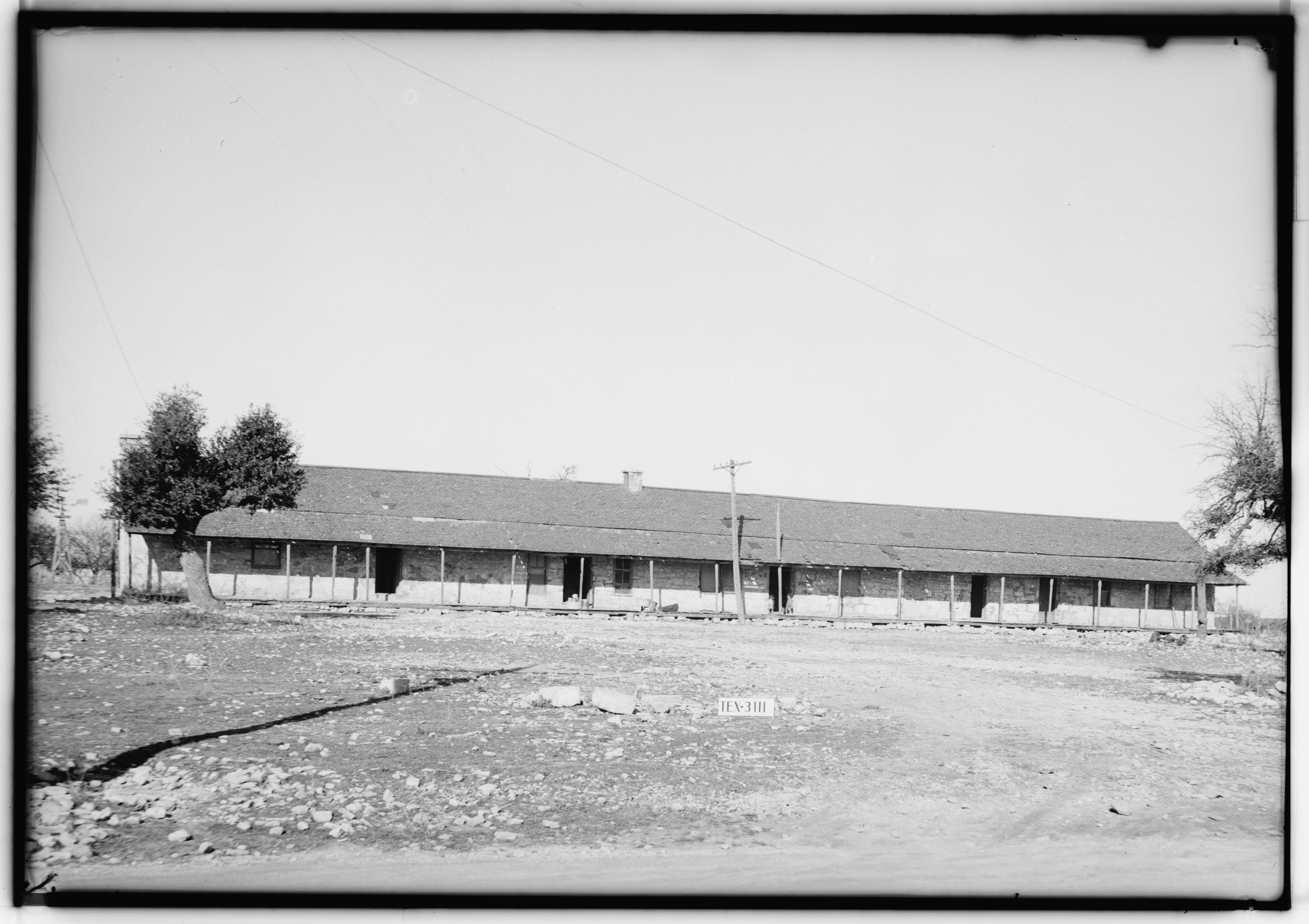
Fort McKavett Barracks (photo dated 1936)

Stance joined the 9th Cavalry Regiment on October 2, 1866, less than two months after it was formed, and was promoted to Sergeant in March 1867. The initial commitment was to last five years. Farmer was the occupation noted on his oath of enlistment. It was also noted that Stance could read and write, making him a highly desirable recruit. He received a two-month leave at the end of March 1867 and so did not join the regiment on the Morgan line steamships to Indianola, Texas where troop frontier assignments were to be determined. This also meant he was not present during the violent altercation between officers and soldiers near San Antonio in April 1867, in which Sergeant Harrison Bradford and Lieutenant Seth E. Griffin died and 10 soldiers deserted from Lieutenant Edward Heyl's E Troop.

Upon returning from leave in May 1867, Stance was stationed to Troop F at Fort Davis in Western Texas. For three months of 1868, Stance was in charge of soldiers on extra duty in the Quartermaster Department. While there, it is possible that Stance was responsible for constructing and maintaining the fort - operating a sawmill, a stone quarry, or an adobe brickyard - as this was also expected of soldiers in Texas forts. He led his first reconnaissance patrol in September 1868 with eight privates. Sometime in 1868 or 1869 he received a fine of $10 at a court martial hearing over threats made and punches thrown when a horse comb was misplaced.

Stance fought in two major Indian battles in the Fall of 1869. In September, a force of 100 troopers killed 25 natives from a group of 200 natives formed from the Kiowas and Comanches tribes near Middle Brazos River. In October, while on the same mission, the 9th Cavalry, the 4th Cavalry, and some native scouts fought 500 enemy natives near the Middle Brazos River. At this October battle, forty enemy natives were killed without any losses from the cavalry troops. Stance was stationed with Troop F to Fort McKavett at the end of 1869.

=== Medal of Honor actions ===
At the time of his actions, Stance was serving in Troop F of the 9th Cavalry Regiment at Fort McKavett. On May 20, 1870, he was sent with a patrol to find the Apaches who had kidnapped Herman Lehmann and his younger brother, Willie, four days earlier. Stance and his men located the raiding party near Kickapoo Springs, about fourteen miles north of Fort McKavett, and charged at them and opened fire with their Spencer carbines. The Apaches abandoned their stolen horses and fled, enabling Willie Lehmann to escape during the chaos. On the return to the fort, Stance and his troopers charged natives at least two other times while the natives were attempting to steal horses and returned with 15 stolen horses. None of Stance's men were injured. For his bravery on this mission, Stance was cited for "[g]allantry on scout after Indians" and received the Medal of Honor a month later, on June 28, 1870.

=== Later career ===
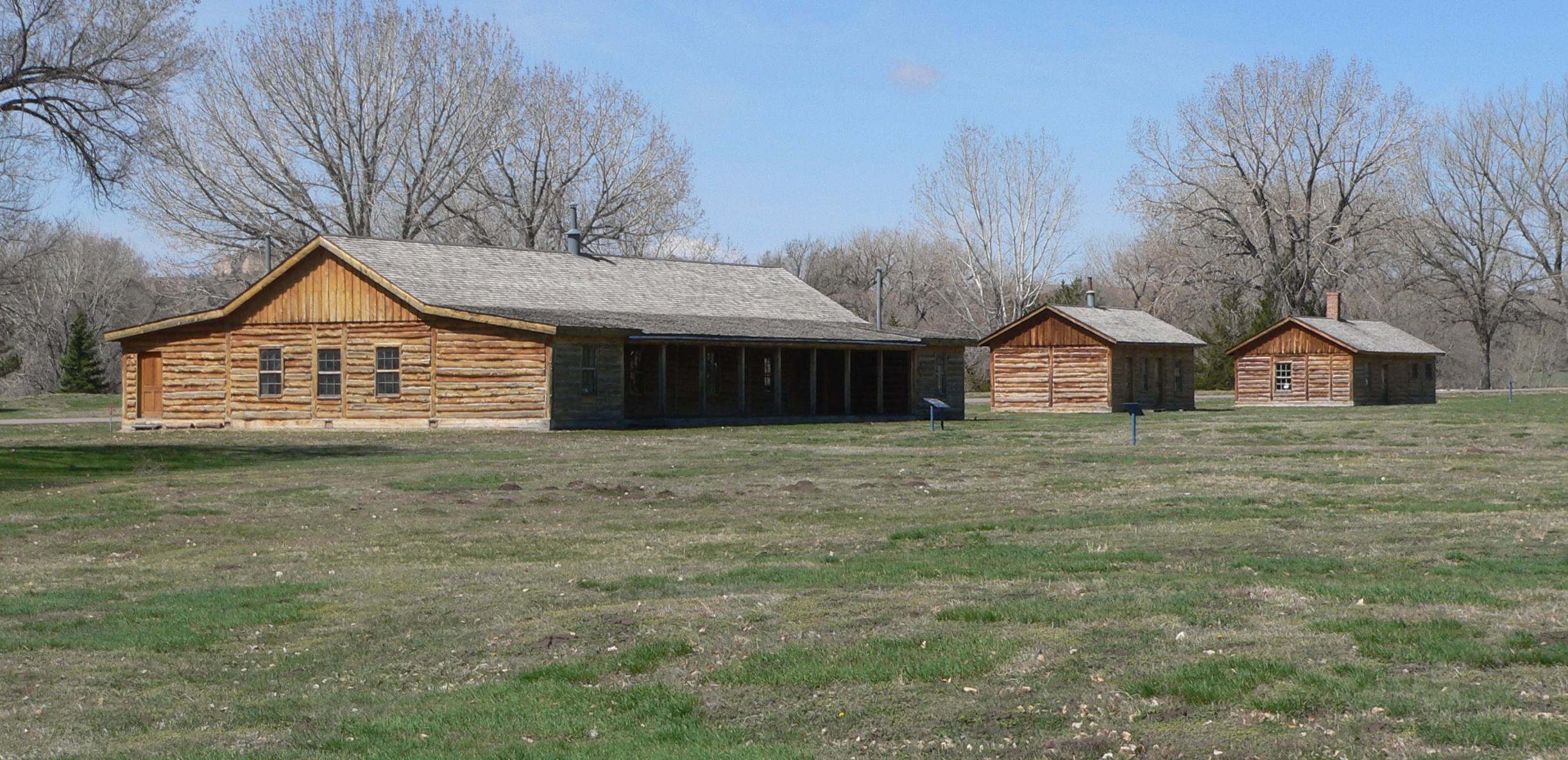
Reconstructed parade ground buildings at Fort Robinson

Stance was reduced to private sometime between July 1870 and April 1871, possibly due to fighting, drinking, or failing to report for duty. He completed his first enlistment on October 2, 1871, as a private under the name Edmund Stance. He reenlisted to Troop M under the Edmund Stance name shortly afterward. In December 1872, Stance got into a fight with First Sergeant Henry Green and bit off a portion of Green's lower lip after Green reported Stance as being drunk on duty. Stance was demoted and spent six months in the guardhouse.

Stance was among the troops that fought Apache chief Victorio in New Mexico. Stance was also among the troops that chased Sooners off native land in Oklahoma before the U.S. government gave approval to settle in those lands. Stance enlisted back to Troop F in 1880. Stance would reach the rank of Sergeant at least four more times, twice with Troop M and twice with Troop F. While First Sergeant with Troop F at Fort Robinson in 1886, the troop celebrated his 20 years of service with a dinner and a dance given in his honor.

=== Death ===
In the late 1880s, Stance was directly involved in four of ten disciplinary incidents with privates and non-commissioned officers. F Troops sergeants and privates frequently clashed. The sergeants used browbeating techniques they had possibly learned from Lieutenant Edward Heyl and other earlier leaders, and the newer recruits chafed under that style of leadership. Stance was found shot on Christmas morning of 1887 on the road to Crawford, Nebraska. He was shot with a service revolver and all evidence pointed to Stance's privates. Private Miller Milds of F Troop was charged with murder, but was freed for lack of evidence. His obituary writer called Stance a strict disciplinarian, but also said that his style of leadership was necessary for his troops. Stance was buried at Fort McPherson National Cemetery, Maxwell, Nebraska.

== Medal of Honor citation ==
Rank and organization: Sergeant, Company F, 9th U.S. Cavalry. Place and date: At Kickapoo Springs, Tex., 20 May 1870. Entered service at. ------. Birth: Carroll Parish, La. Date of issue: 28 June 1870.

Citation.

Gallantry on scout after Indians.

== See also ==
- List of Medal of Honor recipients for the Indian Wars
- Bowmaster, Patrick A. “Buffalo Soldier Emanuel Stance Received the Medal of Honor and Became a Legend.” Wild West, February 1997, 32, 34, 82–87.
- Bowmaster, Patrick A. ed. “A Medal of Honor for a Buffalo Soldier.” Journal of the Indian Wars 1, no. 4 (2000): 119–24.
