= United States Soldiers' and Airmen's Home National Cemetery =

Veterans cemetery

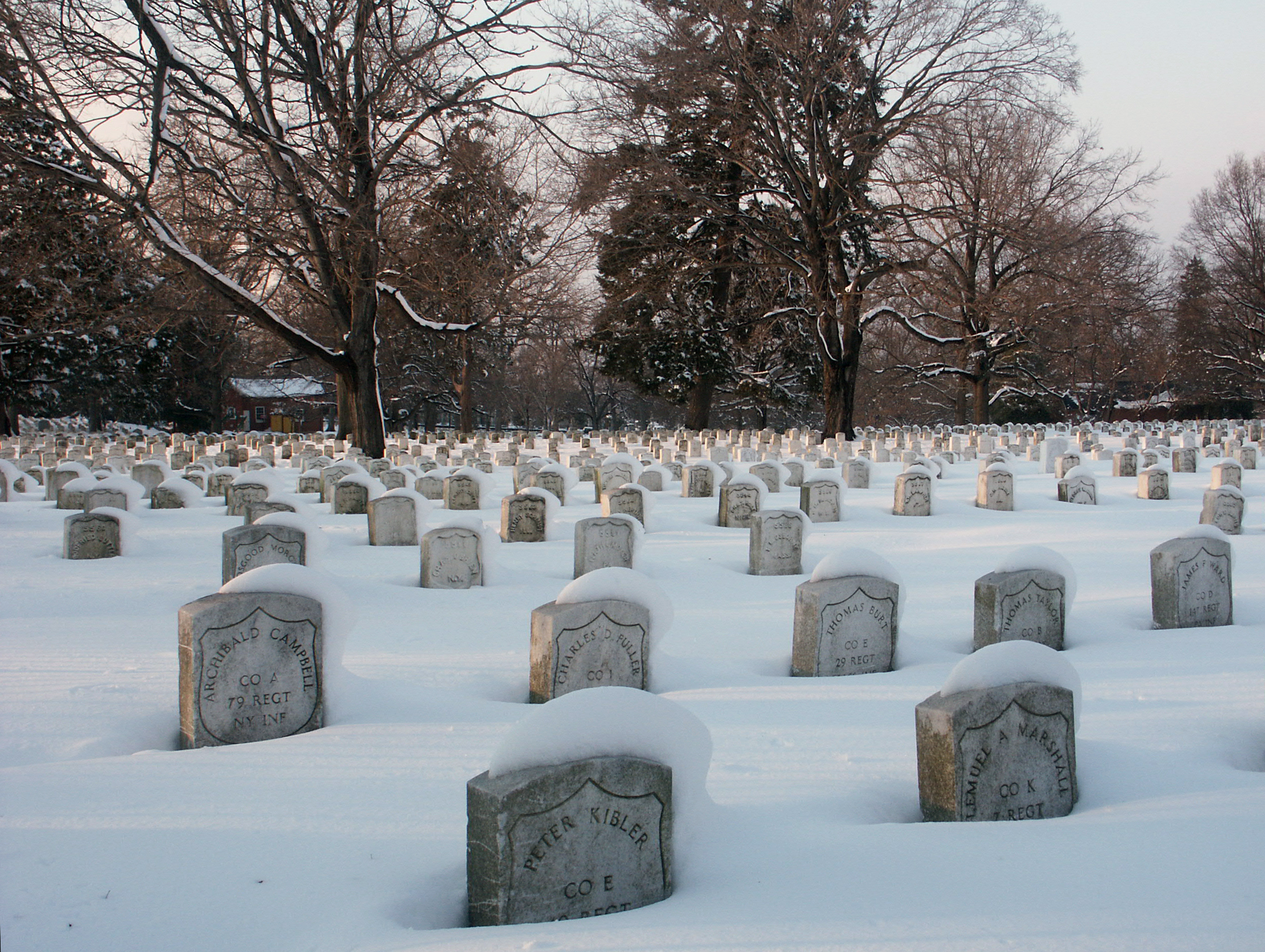
- Snow-covered headstones at the United States Soldiers' and Airmen's Home National Cemetery in February 2006
- Interactive map of United States Soldiers' and Airmen's Home National Cemetery

Details
- Established: July 1861
- Location: 21 Harewood Rd NW, Washington, D.C., US
- Country: United States
- Coordinates: 38°56′40″N 77°00′32″W
- Type: United States National Cemetery
- Owned by: U.S. Department of the Army
- The Political Graveyard: United States Soldiers' and Airmen's Home National Cemetery

United States Soldiers' and Airmen's Home National Cemetery, in Washington, D.C., is located next to the U.S. Soldiers' and Airmen's Home. It is one of only two national cemeteries administered by the Department of the Army, the other being Arlington National Cemetery. The national cemetery is adjacent to the historic Rock Creek Cemetery and to the Soldiers' Home.

== Background ==
Immediately after the Battle of Bull Run, the Commissioners of the United States Military Asylum offered six acres of land at the north end of their grounds as a burial ground for soldiers and officers, which was sold to them by George Washington Riggs when the asylum was established.

The only people presently eligible for burial at the cemetery are residents of the Armed Forces Retirement Home.

== Notable interments ==
The cemetery is the final resting place for more than 14,000 veterans, starting with those that fought in the Civil War.

- Thomas Boyne (1849–1896), Buffalo Soldier in the Indian Wars, sergeant, and Medal of Honor recipient
- Benjamin Brown (1859–1910), Buffalo Soldier in the Indian Wars, sergeant, and Medal of Honor recipient
- John Denny (1846–1901), Buffalo Soldier in the Indian Wars, sergeant, and Medal of Honor recipient
- Henry Jackson Hunt (1819–1889), Union Army chief of artillery, and artillery general of The Army of the Potomac in the American Civil War
- John C. Kelton (1828–1893), Adjutant Brigadier General of the U.S. Army from 1889 to 1892
- John A. Logan (1826–1886), Union Army major general in the American Civil War, 1884 Republican vice presidential nominee, Illinois senator (1871–77 & 1879–86) and Illinois representative (1859–62 & 1867–71)
- David S. Stanley (1828–1902), Union Army major general in the American Civil War and Medal of Honor recipient
- Agnes von Kurowsky (1892–1984), an American nurse during World War I who was the basis for the character "Catherine Barkley" in A Farewell to Arms

== See also ==
- President Lincoln and Soldiers' Home National Monument
