= John Denny (Medal of Honor) =

United States Army Medal of Honor recipient

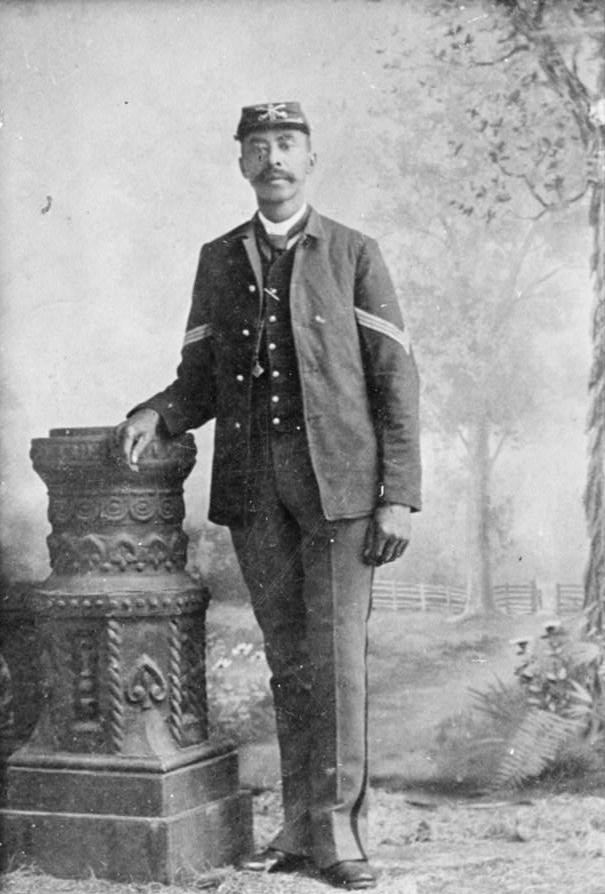
- Sergeant John Denny
- Born: c. 1849; Big Flats, New York, US
- Died: November 28, 1901 (aged 52)
- Burial place: United States Soldiers' and Airmen's Home National Cemetery Washington, D.C.
- Military career
- Allegiance: United States
- Branch: United States Army
- Service years: 1867–1897
- Rank: First Sergeant
- Unit: 9th Cavalry Regiment
- Conflicts: American Indian Wars
- Awards: Medal of Honor

John Denny (c. 1849 – November 28, 1901) was a Buffalo Soldier in the United States Army and a recipient of America's highest military decoration—the Medal of Honor—for his actions in the Indian Wars of the western United States.

== Career ==
Denny joined the Army from Elmira, New York in 1867, and, by September 18, 1879, was serving as a First Sergeant in Company C of the 9th Cavalry Regiment. On that day, his unit participated in an engagement against Chief Victorio and his band of Apaches at Las Animas Canyon, New Mexico, and Denny "[r]emoved a wounded comrade, under a heavy fire, to a place of safety." For his actions, Sergeant Denny was awarded the Medal of Honor fifteen years later, in January 1895.

Denny retired from the Army in September 1897 as a corporal. He received a pension but also worked at the Fort Robinson post exchange. He moved to the US Soldiers' Home in Washington, D.C. sometime in or after 1899 and died there in 1901 at the age of 52. Denny was buried at the United States Soldiers' and Airmen's Home National Cemetery in Washington, D.C.

== Medal of Honor citation ==
Rank and organization: Sergeant, Company C, 9th U.S. Cavalry. Place and date: At Las Animas Canyon, N. Mex., September 18, 1879. Entered service at: 1867 Elmira, N.Y. Birth: Big Flats, N.Y. Date of issue: November 27, 189i.

Citation:

Removed a wounded comrade, under a heavy fire, to a place of safety.

== See also ==
- List of Medal of Honor recipients
- List of Medal of Honor recipients for the Indian Wars
- List of African-American Medal of Honor recipients
