= Edward Anderson (general, born 1864) =

United States Army general

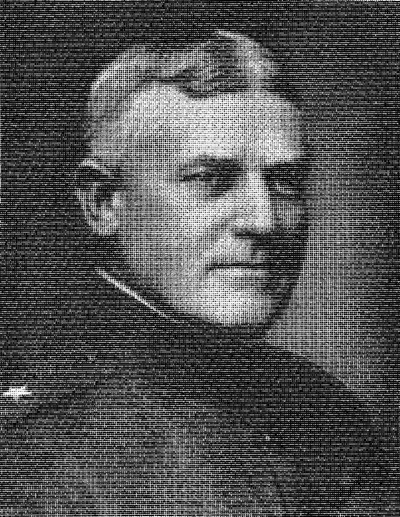
- Born: May 31, 1864; Chatham, Virginia, C.S.
- Died: November 2, 1937 (aged 73) Lake City, Florida, U.S.
- Buried: Arlington National Cemetery
- Branch: United States Army
- Service years: 1888–1923
- Rank: Brigadier General
- Service number: 0-210
- Commands: 16th U.S. Cavalry Regiment (Acting); 5th U.S. Cavalry Regiment; 99th Division (Interim); 162nd Depot Brigade; 13th U.S. Cavalry Regiment; 9th U.S. Cavalry Regiment; 26th U.S. Cavalry Regiment
- Conflicts: Ghost Dance War; Spanish–American War; World War I
- Spouse: Amelie Anderson

Edward Anderson (May 31, 1864 – November 2, 1937) was an American brigadier general who served during World War I.

== Early life ==
Anderson was born on May 31, 1864, in Pittsylvania County, Virginia. He attended the Virginia Polytechnic Institute, graduating in 1883. Anderson then graduated number thirty of forty-four from the United States Military Academy in 1888.

== Career ==
After graduation, Anderson was commissioned a second lieutenant of infantry but was switched to cavalry and performed frontier duty until 1895. He was in the Ghost Dance War of 1890. In June 1897, he graduated first in his class from the Infantry and Cavalry School at Fort Leavenworth, Kansas. In 1898, Anderson served in the Puerto Rican campaign. For his service in Cuba, he received three Silver Star commendations. After the Spanish–American War, Anderson taught tactics back at the Military Academy from August 1898 to August 1902.

Anderson was promoted to major in February 1912. He graduated from the Army War College on May 1, 1914. He was promoted to lieutenant colonel in July 1916 and served as acting commander of the 16th Cavalry at Mercedes, Texas from February to July 1917.

Anderson was promoted to colonel in May 1917 and commanded the Fifth Cavalry at Fort Bliss, Texas from July 1917 to October 1918.

Anderson received a promotion to the wartime rank of brigadier general on October 1, 1918. From October 5 to November 22, 1918, he served as interim commander of the 99th Division at Camp Pike, Arkansas. He then commanded the 162nd Depot Brigade and Camp Pike. His rank was reduced back to colonel on March 1, 1919.

From March 19, 1919, to February 23, 1921, he commanded the 13th Cavalry and the post of Fort Clark, Texas. From April 3, 1921, to October 11, 1922, he commanded the Ninth Cavalry at Camp Stotsenberg in the Philippines, then he organized and commanded the 26th Cavalry of Philippine Scouts from October 1922 until January 6, 1923.

After thirty-eight years of service, Anderson retired as a colonel on April 28, 1923.

On June 21, 1930, his brigadier general's star was restored by an act of Congress.

== Awards ==
- Silver Star

== Personal life ==
In 1921, he married Amelie Duncan (1896-1985) of Chatham, Virginia. They lived in Jacksonville, Florida with a daughter and two sons.

== Death and legacy ==
Edward Anderson died as the result of a heart ailment in Lake City, Florida at the age of seventy-two on November 2, 1937. He was interred at Arlington National Cemetery.

== Bibliography ==
- Davis, Henry Blaine Jr. Generals in Khaki. Raleigh, NC: Pentland Press, 1998. ISBN 1571970886 OCLC 231779136
