= Fort McPherson, Nebraska =

19th-century U.S. Army outpost in Nebraska, United States

Coordinates: 41°00′58″N 100°31′03″W

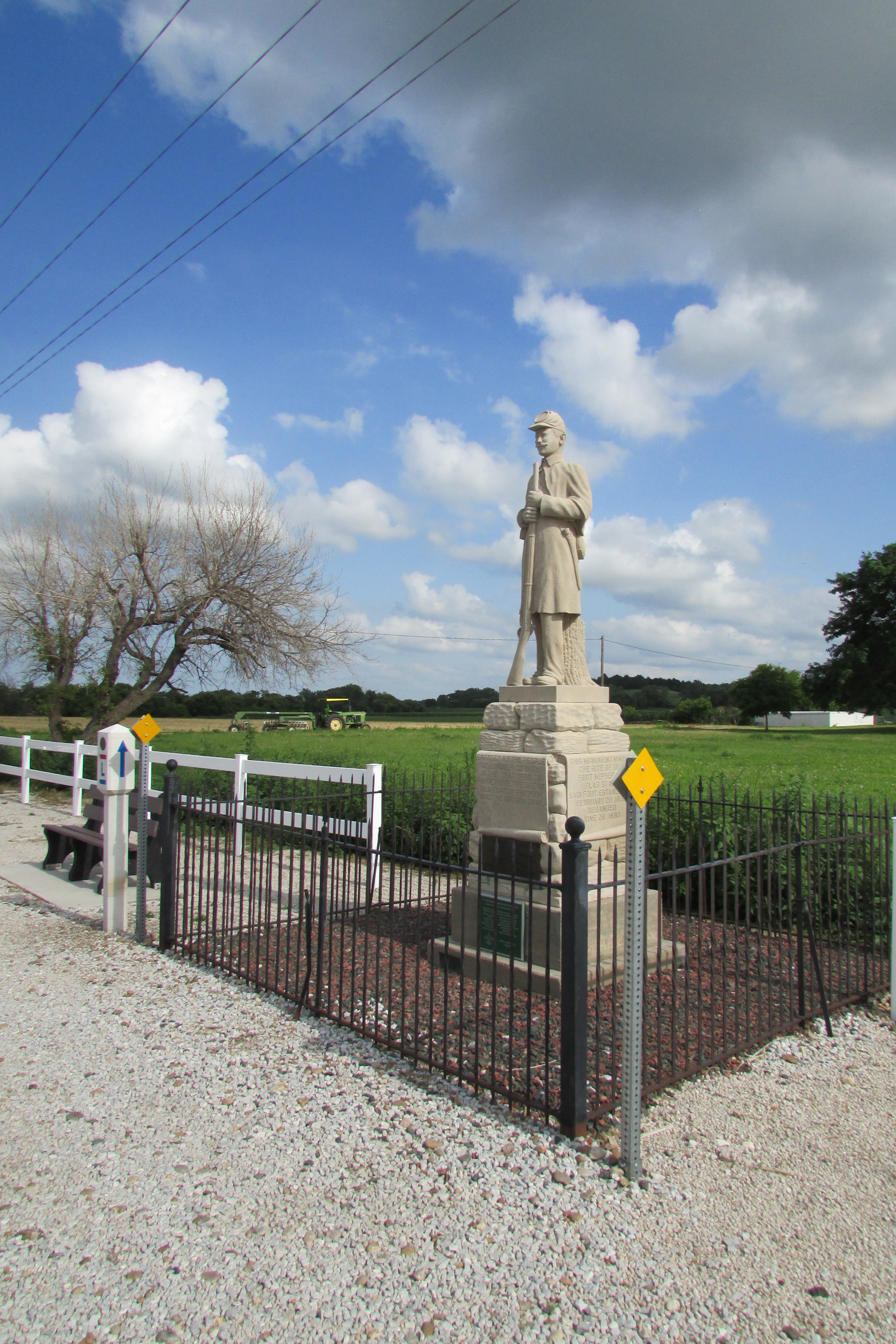
Site of Fort McPherson, along the Oregon and California Trails

Fort McPherson, originally called Cantonment McKean and popularly known as Fort Cottonwood and Post Cottonwood, was an Indian Wars-era U.S. Army installation in the Nebraska Territory, located near the site of present-day North Platte, Nebraska.

== Location ==
It was located on the banks of the North Platte River, at the mouth of Cottonwood Canyon, a strategic location near the junction of South and North Platte Rivers. Cottonwood Springs, a natural spring in an abandoned bed of the river, was the only spring for many miles along the river and a favored spot used by the plains Indians.

We started early on October 11th, and passed Gilmans' ranch, which was built of cedar, and, going fifteen miles farther, camped at a spring called Cottonwood Springs. A man by the name of Charles MacDonald had built a cedar ranch at the mouth of Cottonwood Canyon, which canyon came down to the river near Cottonwood Springs. Cottonwood Springs was merely a seep in a gully which had been an old bed of the river, and which had curved up towards Cottonwood Canyon. The water-bed of the river being largely composed of gravel, the water came down in the underflow, and seeped out at a place down in the bank where there had grown a large cottonwood tree. This spring had been dug out, and was the only spring as far as known along the Platte for two hundred miles. It was at the mouth of Cottonwood Canyon that we were to build our military post. The place was a great crossing for the Indians going north and south. The valley here was several miles wide. There was a large island in the river of several thousand acres, upon which grew the finest grass to be found in the country, and there were some scrubby willows and cottonwoods; so that the Indians coming from the north found it a good stopping-place to feed their ponies either in summer or winter, because in the winter the ponies could eat the cottonwood brush. In addition to this, Cottonwood Canyon gave a fine passage to the south. A road went up on the floor of the canyon, between the trees, until it rose onto the tableland twenty miles south. The canyon furnished fuel and protection. It was for the purpose of breaking up this Indian run-way that we were ordered to build a post at the mouth of the canyon.

== History ==
The decision to build the fort was following the Dakota War of 1862. It was an outpost to protect travelers along the Oregon and California Trails, between Fort Kearny and Colorado and to keep the peace with the local Native Americans. The fort was built by troops of the 7th Regiment Iowa Volunteer Cavalry using cedar logs cut in Cottonwood Canyon. It was completed in October 1863. Originally named Cantonment McKean, on February 26, 1866, it was renamed Fort McPherson in the honor of Major General James B. McPherson. However, it was always popularly known as Fort Cottonwood.

Numerous expeditions were launched from Fort McPherson during the Indian Wars. The most important was the expedition of General Eugene Asa Carr which finished with the defeat of the Cheyenne Indians at the Battle of Summit Springs.

In 1873, Captain Charles Meinhold and his small command from the fort were the first to travel up the Massacre Canyon after a large-scale Pawnee-Sioux battle. "We advanced from the mouth of the ravine to its head and found fifty-nine dead Pawnees...", wrote Army doctor David Franklin Powell.

The fort was abandoned in 1880.

A cemetery was created along with the fort. In 1873, 20 acres (81,000 m^{2}) were set aside for Fort McPherson National Cemetery, and the remains interred in the original post cemetery were moved to it.

== See also ==
- Fort McPherson National Cemetery
