= The Columbus Post =

Newspaper in Columbus, Ohio

- Type: Weekly newspaper
- Owner: Alan W. Sorter
- Founder: Amos Lynch
- Founded: 1995
- Ceased publication: 2018
- Language: English
- Country: Columbus, Ohio

The Columbus Post was a weekly newspaper devoted to the African-American community in Columbus, Ohio. It published in print from 1995 to 2015, and then ceased online publication about three years later.

== History ==
The newspaper was founded in 1995 by Amos Lynch (1925–2015). Lynch was editor in chief of the Columbus edition of the Call and Post for 33 years prior to founding the Post. He had also played a founding role in the Ohio Sentinel in 1949. He was inducted into the Ohio Civil Rights Hall of Fame in 2011. While editor of the Call & Post, Lynch was credited with bringing down longtime mayor M. E. Sensenbrenner, with the publication of photos depicting victims of police brutality the day before the 1971 election. In 2015, more than a decade after Lynch's retirement and a few months after his death, the Post transitioned to a digital-only product, delivered by email. Alan W. Sorter purchased the paper at some point and launched an online digital news platform in 2018.
