= Frank N. Schubert =

American author and military historian (born 1943)

Frank N. "Mickey" Schubert
- Born: June 3, 1943 (age 83); Washington, DC, US
- Education: Howard University; University of Wyoming; University of Toledo
- Occupations: Historian and Author
- Spouse: Irene
- Writing career
- Genres: History, Military History
- Notable works: Black Valor: Buffalo Soldiers and the Medal of Honor, 1870–1898; Buffalo Soldiers, Braves, and the Brass: The Story of Fort Robinson, Nebraska

Frank N. "Mickey" Schubert (born June 3, 1943) is an American author and military historian. He was the chief of joint operational history in the Joint History Office, Office of the Chairman, Joint Chiefs of Staff until his retirement in 2003. He is a graduate of Howard University (BA, 1965), the University of Wyoming (MA, 1970), and the University of Toledo (PhD, 1977). He is a veteran of the Vietnam War and worked as a historian in the Department of Defense for the US Army Corps of Engineers (1977–1989), the US Army Center of Military History (1989–1993), and the Joint History Office of the Office of the Chairman of the Joint Chiefs of Staff (1993–2003). He was a Fulbright scholar at Babes Bolyai University in Cluj, Romania, during the academic year 2003–2004 and has lectured at universities and research centers in seven European countries. His published work has focused on North American frontier exploration, black soldiers in the US Army, and military construction. He was born in Washington, DC.

== Bibliography ==
- Schubert, Frank N., ed. (2013). Other Than War: The American Military Experience and Operations in the Post-Cold War Decade. Department of Defense. ISBN 978-0160917691.
- Schubert, Frank N. (2011). Hungarian Borderlands: From the Habsburg Empire to the Axis Alliance, the Warsaw Pact and the European Union. Bloomsbury Academic. ISBN 978-1441114938.
- Schubert, Frank N., ed. (2004). The Nation Builders: A Sesquicentennial History of the Corps of Topographical Engineers 1838–1863. University Press of the Pacific. ISBN 978-1410218728.
- Schubert, Frank N. (2003). Voices of the Buffalo Soldier: Records, Reports, and Recollections of Military Life and Service in the West. University of New Mexico Press. ISBN 978-0826323101.
- Schubert, Frank N. (2002). Building Air Bases in the Negev: The U.S. Army Corps of Engineers in Israel, 1979–1982. University Press of the Pacific. ISBN 978-0898758276.
- Schubert, Frank N. (1997). Black Valor: Buffalo Soldiers and the Medal of Honor, 1870–1898. Scholarly Resources Inc. ISBN 978-0842025867.
- Schubert, Frank N. (1995). Mobilization: The U.S. Army in World War II: The 50th Anniversary. Createspace Independent Publishing Platform. ISBN 978-1515363156.
- Schubert, Frank N. (1995). On the Trail of the Buffalo Soldier: Biographies of African Americans in the U.S. Army, 1866–1917. Scarecrow Press. ISBN 978-0842024822.
- Schubert, Frank N. (1995). Outpost of the Sioux Wars: A History of Fort Robinson. University of Nebraska Press. ISBN 978-0803292260.
- Schubert, Frank N.; Kraus, Theresa L., eds. (1995). The Whirlwind War: The United States Army in Operations Desert Shield and Desert Storm (Cmh Pub, 70-30). Diane Pub Co. ISBN 978-0788128295.
- Schubert, Frank N. (1992). Buffalo Soldiers, Braves, and the Brass: The Story of Fort Robinson, Nebraska. White Mane Publishing Company. ISBN 978-0942597448.
- Schubert, Frank N. (1980). Vanguard of Expansion: Army Engineers in the Trans-Mississippi West, 1819–1879. Department of the Army, Office of the Chief of Engineers.
