= Maxwell, Nebraska =

Village in Lincoln County, Nebraska, United States

- Village
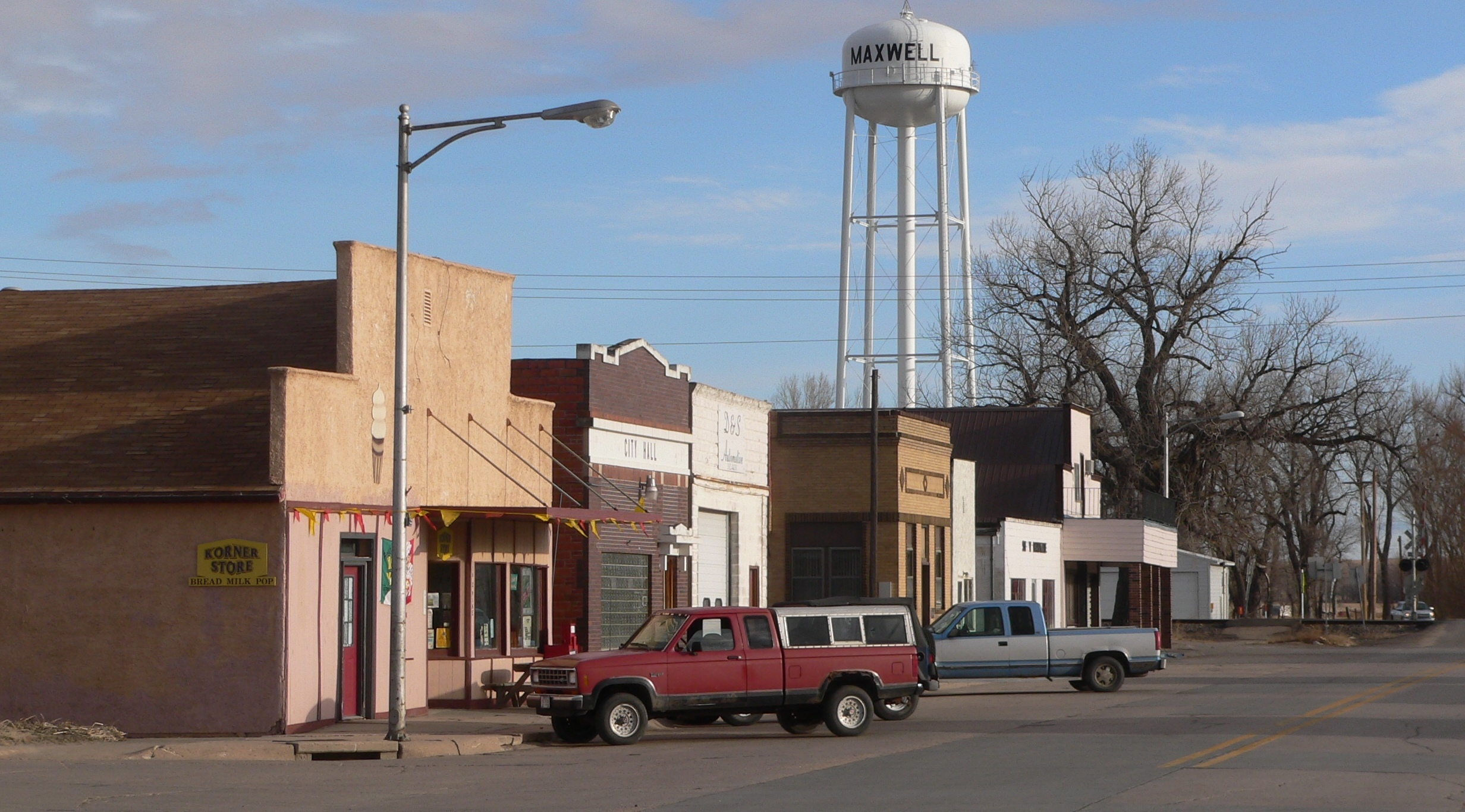
- Downtown Maxwell, as viewed from Nebraska Spur 56A, March 2012

- Location of Maxwell, Nebraska
- Coordinates: 41°04′38″N 100°31′35″W
- Country: United States
- State: Nebraska
- County: Lincoln

Area
  - Total: 0.46 sq mi (1.20 km^{2})
  - Land: 0.46 sq mi (1.20 km^{2})
  - Water: 0 sq mi (0.00 km^{2})
- Elevation: 2,713 ft (827 m)

Population (2020)
  - Total: 257
  - Density: 554.7/sq mi (214.19/km^{2})
- Time zone: UTC-6 (Central (CST))
  - Summer (DST): UTC-5 (CDT)
- ZIP code: 69151
- Area code: 308
- FIPS code: 31-31220
- GNIS feature ID: 2399277

Maxwell is a village in Lincoln County, Nebraska, United States. It is part of the North Platte Micropolitan Statistical Area. As of the 2020 census, Maxwell had a population of 257.

== History ==
Maxwell was platted in 1894 after the Union Pacific Railroad was extended to that point. The town was named for a railroad official. Maxwell was incorporated as a village in 1908.

On May 17, 2000, Maxwell was hit by an F3 tornado.

== Geography ==
According to the United States Census Bureau, the village has a total area of 0.34 square miles (0.88 km^{2}), all land.

== Demographics ==
Historical population
Census	Pop.	Note	%±
1910	289		—
1920	410		41.9%
1930	409		−0.2%
1940	480		17.4%
1950	347		−27.7%
1960	324		−6.6%
1970	282		−13.0%
1980	410		45.4%
1990	285		−30.5%
2000	315		10.5%
2010	312		−1.0%
2020	257		−17.6%
U.S. Decennial Census

=== 2010 census ===
As of the census of 2010, there were 312 people, 121 households, and 87 families residing in the village. The population density was 917.6 inhabitants per square mile (354.3/km^{2}). There were 133 housing units at an average density of 391.2 per square mile (151.0/km^{2}). The racial makeup of the village was 96.5% White, 0.6% African American, 1.0% Native American, 1.0% from other races, and 1.0% from two or more races. Hispanic or Latino of any race were 2.6% of the population.

There were 121 households, of which 39.7% had children under the age of 18 living with them, 55.4% were married couples living together, 6.6% had a female householder with no husband present, 9.9% had a male householder with no wife present, and 28.1% were non-families. 24.8% of all households were made up of individuals, and 12.4% had someone living alone who was 65 years of age or older. The average household size was 2.58 and the average family size was 3.06.

The median age in the village was 38.6 years. 27.9% of residents were under the age of 18; 7.3% were between the ages of 18 and 24; 24.1% were from 25 to 44; 26% were from 45 to 64; and 14.7% were 65 years of age or older. The gender makeup of the village was 49.4% male and 50.6% female.

=== 2000 census ===
As of the census of 2000, there were 315 people, 116 households, and 87 families residing in the village. The population density was 933.5 inhabitants per square mile (360.4/km^{2}). There were 131 housing units at an average density of 388.2 per square mile (149.9/km^{2}). The racial makeup of the village was 97.78% White, 0.63% African American, and 1.59% from two or more races. Hispanic or Latino of any race were 2.86% of the population.

There were 116 households, out of which 43.1% had children under the age of 18 living with them, 60.3% were married couples living together, 8.6% had a female householder with no husband present, and 25.0% were non-families. 21.6% of all households were made up of individuals, and 9.5% had someone living alone who was 65 years of age or older. The average household size was 2.72 and the average family size was 3.22.

In the village, the population was spread out, with 32.7% under the age of 18, 8.6% from 18 to 24, 28.6% from 25 to 44, 19.0% from 45 to 64, and 11.1% who were 65 years of age or older. The median age was 32 years. For every 100 females, there were 107.2 males. For every 100 females age 18 and over, there were 100.0 males.

As of 2000 the median income for a household in the village was $35,625, and the median income for a family was $45,469. Males had a median income of $39,500 versus $23,750 for females. The per capita income for the village was $13,911. About 12.9% of families and 13.1% of the population were below the poverty line, including 13.4% of those under age 18 and 4.7% of those age 65 or over.

== See also ==
- List of municipalities in Nebraska
