= Victorio Peak treasure =

Alleged gold cache in the U.S. state of New Mexico

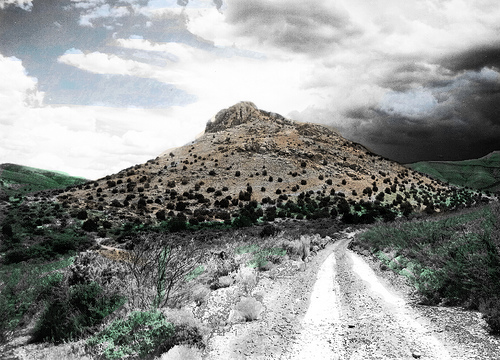
Victorio Peak

The Victorio Peak treasure (also seen in print as the Treasure of Victorio Peak or Treasure of San Andres) describes a cache of gold reportedly found inside Victorio Peak in 1937 in southern New Mexico.

== History ==
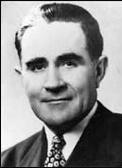
Doc Noss

The treasure was allegedly found in 1937 by American businessman and gold prospector Milton Ernest "Doc" Noss. (Note: Noss was born on July 3, 1905, in Taloga, Oklahoma.) While there have been multiple documented expeditions to the peak, no gold has been officially recorded as being recovered from the site. Noss was ultimately killed by an associate, Charley Ryan, in 1949 after Ryan accused Noss of fraud and Noss allegedly threatened to kill Ryan and his family. (Note: Noss died on March 5, 1949, in Hatch, New Mexico.)

A 1961 search by the U.S. Army—the peak lies within White Sands Missile Range—was stopped following a request to state officials by Noss's first wife, Ova. She later was part of an unsuccessful 1963 search. During the 1970s, lawyer F. Lee Bailey represented clients who claimed to know where the treasure was located. By 1992, a grandson of Ova formed the Ova Noss Family Partnership to finance additional searching. The partnership conducted unsuccessful searches until March 1996, when the Army suspended their access.

Theories abound on the origins of the alleged treasure, including that it was pilfered from Mexico during the reign of Emperor Maximilian, or through collusion between Pancho Villa and Germany prior to World War I.

== In media ==
The reported treasure and efforts to find it have been covered in books and on television, including:

- a September 1977 segment of 60 Minutes by Dan Rather, who also interviewed Ova Noss
- the 1978 book 100 Tons of Gold by David Leon Chandler
- the television show Unsolved Mysteries; originally on May 10, 1989, and an update on February 11, 1990
- a 2008 book co-authored by Robert Boswell, titled What Men Call Treasure
- a six-part television series titled Gold, Lies & Videotape, which debuted on Discovery Channel in January 2023

== See also ==
- Battle of Hembrillo Basin, an 1880 battle between the U.S. Army and Apaches led by Chief Victorio
- Executive Order 6102, a 1933 action that limited gold ownership in the United States
