= Battle of Carrizo Canyon =

- Part of Victorio's War, Apache Wars
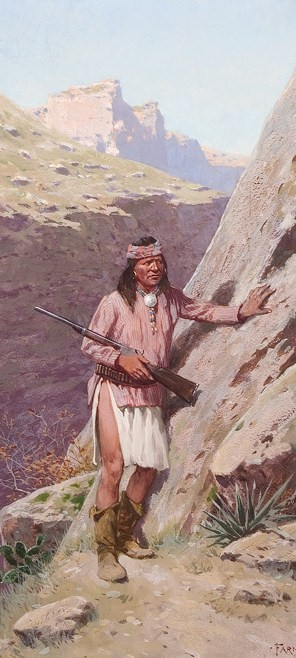
- An Apache rifleman.
Date	August 12, 1881
Location	Carrizo Canyon, New Mexico
Result	United States victory

Belligerents
United States	Apache

Commanders and leaders
(United States) Capt. Charles Parker, Sgt.George Jordan	Nana (chief)

Strength
19	40

Casualties and losses
2 men, 9 horses	4

The Battle of Carrizo Canyon was one of seven battles between Nana's band of Apache warriors and United States Cavalry troops in New Mexico Territory. After the death of Victorio in 1880, Nana took over leadership of the band. Other Apaches joined this old warrior's group. On August 12, 1881, Capt. Charles Parker with 18 10th Cavalry Buffalo Soldiers were following Nana's warriors when they were ambushed in Carrizo Canyon.

== Battle ==
Parker's small command was pinned down by 40 or more rifles. He ordered veteran Sergeant George Jordan to get to higher ground and fire down upon the Apaches. It was a fierce battle, with both sides suffering casualties. Jordan's small group was attacked but was able to hold their position and allow the troops in the canyon to retreat. The Medal of Honor was awarded Sergeant Thomas Shaw and Sergeant Jordan (who was also cited for his leadership at the Battle of Fort Tularosa
