= Victorio's War =

1879–1880 Apache war against the US and Mexico

- Part of the Apache Wars, Apache–Mexico Wars
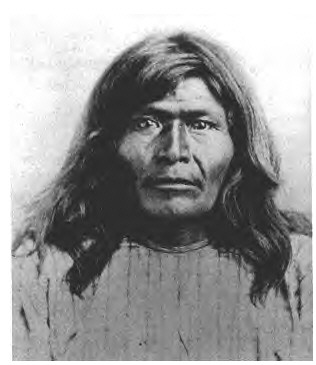
- Victorio
Date	1879–1880
Location	Southwest United States, Northwestern Mexico
Result	Joint Mexico–U.S. victory

Belligerents
United States; Mexico	Apache

Commanders and leaders
(United States) Philip Sheridan; Joaquin Terrazas	Victorio †; Nana

Strength
c. 2,000	c. 150

The Apache can endure fatigue and famine and can live without water for periods that would kill the hardiest mountaineer ... In fighting them we must of necessity be the pursuers and unless we can surprise them by sudden and unexpected attack, the advantage is all in their favor ... You rarely see an Indian; you see the puff of smoke and hear the whiz of his bullets, but the Indian is thoroughly hidden in his rocks ...

— General George Crook

Victorio's War, or the Victorio Campaign, was an armed conflict between the Apache followers of Chief Victorio, the United States, and Mexico beginning in September 1879. Faced with arrest and forcible relocation from his homeland in New Mexico to San Carlos Indian Reservation in southeastern Arizona, Victorio led a guerrilla war across southern New Mexico, west Texas and northern Mexico. Victorio fought many battles and skirmishes with the United States Army and raided several settlements until the Mexican Army killed him and most of his warriors in October 1880 in the Battle of Tres Castillos. After Victorio's death, his lieutenant Nana led a raid in 1881.

Scholar Dan Thrapp wrote of Victorio's War that "never again were [Apache] fighters in such numbers to roam and ravage that country, nor were they again to be so ably led and managed." Victorio, according to scholar Robert N. Watt, "is widely acknowledged as being one of the best guerrilla leaders of the Apache Wars."

== Background ==
In 1879, Victorio was about 55 years old. He was a veteran warrior and leader of the Warm Springs (Ojo Caliente in Spanish) or Chihenne band of Apaches. The homeland of the Warm Springs band was north of present-day Monticello, New Mexico, in the Cañada Alamosa. A reservation at Ojo Caliente was established for Victorio and his band, and a census in 1876 recorded 916 Apache men, women, and children in residence.

In the late 1870s, the U.S. government pursued the policy of concentrating all Apache bands at the San Carlos Indian Reservation in the Arizona desert. Victorio and the Warm Springs Apache opposed the move, both peacefully and violently. Some of the Apaches at San Carlos were enemies of the Warm Springs band, the management of the reservation by government agents was corrupt, and San Carlos was characterized by overcrowding, little grass for livestock to graze or game to hunt, bad water, and hot temperatures. Deaths of Apaches at the reservation were numerous, especially from malaria, a disease previously almost unknown among them.

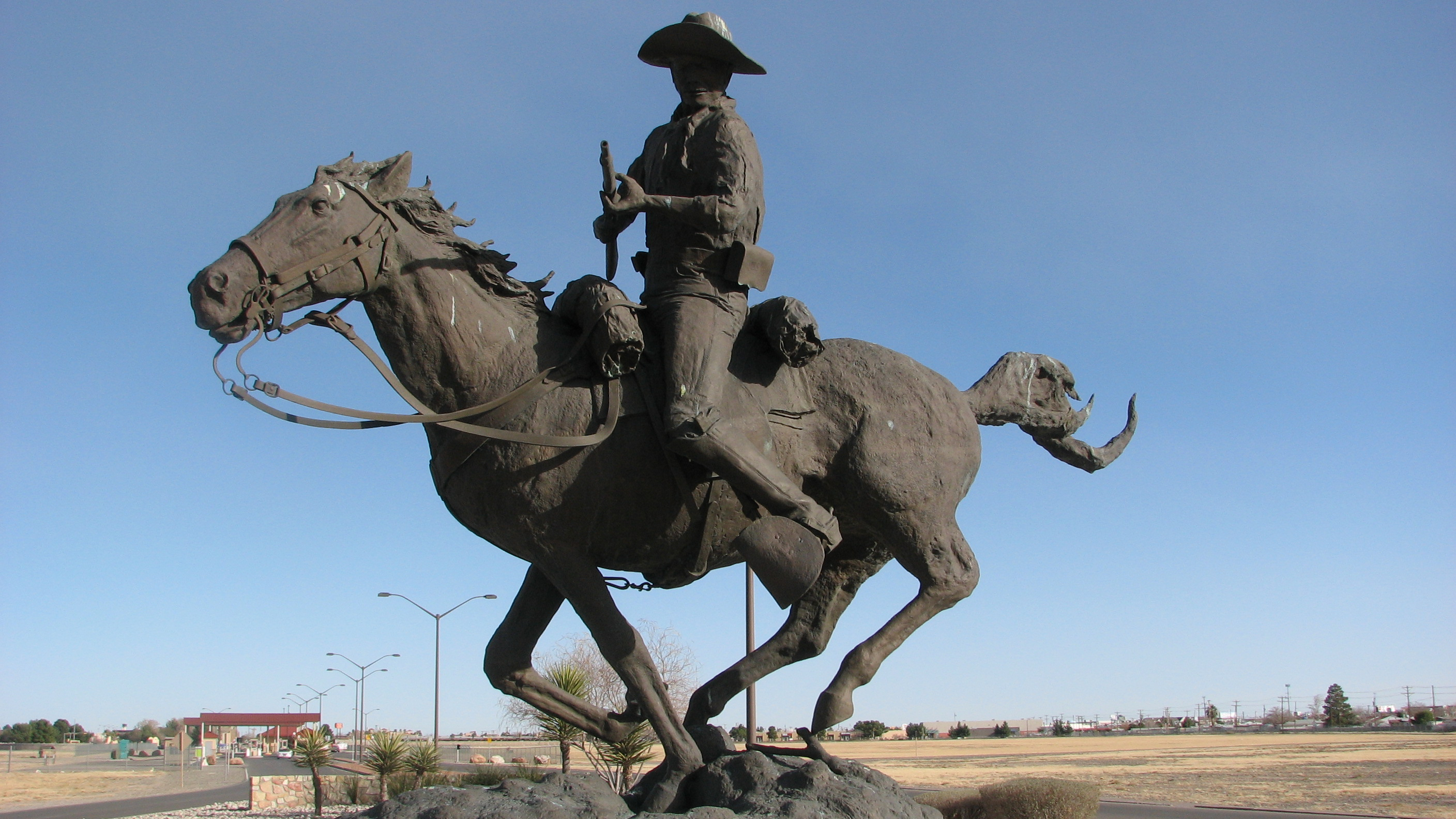
A memorial to Victorio's opponents, the African-American Buffalo Soldiers

The commander of the U.S. army in New Mexico, Colonel Edward Hatch, and the local commander at Ojo Caliente, Lt. Charles W. Merritt, of the 9th Cavalry (made up of African-Americans, the Buffalo Soldiers as they were called by the Apache) unsuccessfully petitioned the government in Washington, D.C. to allow Victorio a reservation at Ojo Caliente.

=== Early skirmish ===
Victorio's Apaches attacked settlers near Silver City beginning in April 1879. 9th Cavalry began its almost constant pursuit of Victorio's band. Captain Beyer and Lieutenant Wright's C Troop, along with some men of I troop, two Navaho scouts, and John R. Foster, a local guide, left Fort Bayard in pursuit on May 25, 1879. Following a tip from local settlers, and finding dead animal carcasses nearby, the 9th Cavalry encountered Victorio's band on May 29, 1879, in a canyon in the Mimbres Mountains. Negotiation broke down, the Apache band moved their women and children to safety, and shooting broke out. I Troop flanked the right side, climbing the mountain toward the Apaches and the Apaches fled on foot without leaving a trail. The cavalry destroyed the Apache camp equipment. Apache losses were unknown, the 9th Cavalry lost one man, and Beyer's force patrolled for 14 more days before returning to Fort Bayard. Victorio would not be encountered again until August 1879. Sergeant Thomas Boyne would receive the Medal of Honor for his actions on May 29, 1879.

In July 1879, Victorio and others were charged by a civilian court in Silver City, New Mexico, with murder and horse theft. Victorio, Nana, and other Warm Springs Apaches were then at the Mescalero reservation in New Mexico. Fearing arrest, Victorio left the reservation on August 21, 1879, to escape both possible punishment and removal from his homeland by the U.S. government. Fleeing with him were approximately 80 warriors and their wives and children. His band was soon augmented by additional followers from the Mescalero and other Apache bands. However, he never had more than 200 warriors under his command—and rarely, if at all, were they concentrated in one place at one time.

Victorio's chief lieutenants were his sister Lozen and Nana, reputed to be more than 70 years old in 1879.

== Battles, skirmishes, and raids ==
=== 1879 ===
Ojo Caliente, 33.57°N 107.60°W, September 4, 1879. From the Mescalero reservation, Victorio and his followers headed for their homeland at Ojo Caliente. Victorio needed horses and he stole about a dozen near Tres Rios. Arriving at Ojo Caliente, 40 of Victorio's men attacked a company of the 9th Cavalry, killing 5 soldiers and 3 civilians and capturing 68 horses and mules.

McEvers Ranch, 32.72°N 107.57°W, September 11, 1879. Victorio ambushed an armed group of civilian volunteers searching for him. The Apaches killed ten armed civilians near McEvers Ranch (Lake Valley) and stole livestock from ranches in the area, also killing a family living nearby at Jaralosa Creek. The survivors of the ambush said the Apache force consisted of 100 men.

Las Animas Canyon, 33.05°N 107.75°W, September 18, 1879. From McEvers Ranch, Victorio headed north to the Black Range. Four companies (more than 100 men) of the 9th Cavalry found Victorio's trail and were lured into Las Animas Canyon. Victorio and 150 men ambushed the soldiers and from the heights above the canyon pinned the soldiers down for the remainder of the day. Late in the afternoon, First Sergeant John Denny and another soldier, while under fire, carried Private A. Freeland to safety across four hundred yards of open ground. Lieutenant Day also rescued a soldier while under fire. The cavalry was able to withdraw after dark, leaving much of its camp gear to be captured by Apaches. Five or six soldiers and two or three Navajo scouts were reported killed—although a cemetery at the site of the battle has at least 32 graves. The canyon where the battle took place is called "Massacre Canyon" and a nearby flat area is called Victorio Park. Lieutenant Day received the Medal of Honor for his actions eleven years later, and First Sergeant John Denny received his Medal of Honor almost sixteen years later. Lieutenant Robert Temple Emmet also received the Medal of Honor for his actions at Las Animas Canyon.

Cuchillo Negro, 33.45°N 107.71°W (approximate), September 29–30, 1879. A two-day running fight in which 200 soldiers of the 9th Cavalry and 36 Indian scouts attempted to find and defeat Victorio in the northern Black Range. Two soldiers were killed and Victorio suffered what were probably his first casualties of the war.

Lloyd's Ranch, 32.57°N 107.44°W, October 10–12, 1879. Victorio raided the ranch, present day Nutt, New Mexico, and killed four armed civilians in a rescue party; on October 12 he killed five of another rescue party (among its members was gunfighter Johnny Ringo). The civilians abandoned the goods in a wagon train to the Apaches.

Guzman Mountains, Mexico, 31.36°N 107.74°W (approximate), October 27–28, 1879. Victorio crossed the border into Mexico and was followed by Major Morrow and 81 men of the 9th Cavalry and Charles B. Gatewood's Apache scouts. Morrow attempted to dislodge Victorio from the mountains, but gave up because of lack of water and exhaustion. The official death toll was one soldier, but Gatewood recalled several soldiers and one Apache scout killed.

Candelaria Mountains, Mexico, 31°07′N 106°57′W, November 9, 1879. An armed force of 18 Mexican civilians searching for Victorio was ambushed and killed. A relief force of 35 men sent out to look for the missing men was also ambushed with fifteen killed. Victorio did not bother to collect the antique arms of the dead Mexicans, indicating that he had sufficient and better arms. This battle stimulated cooperation between the U.S. and Mexico to hunt down Victorio. After these battles, Victorio moved through northern Mexico, raiding and accumulating supplies. Efforts by the government of Mexico to find and defeat him were unsuccessful.

=== 1880 ===
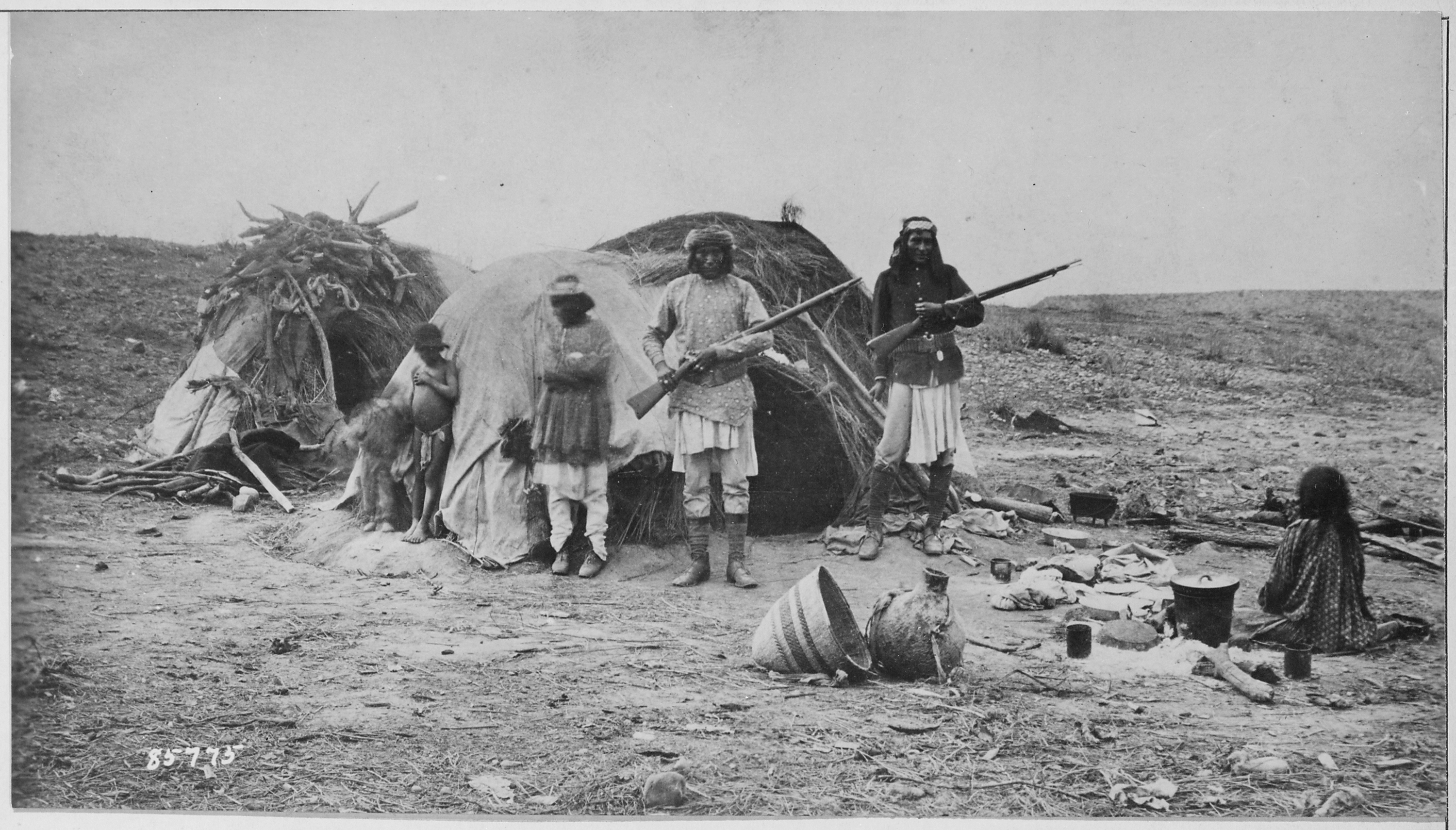
Apache warriors and dwellings, called wikiups

Percha Creek, 32.92°N 107.62°W (approximate), January 12, 1880. Victorio evaded U.S. efforts to block him at the border and slipped back into New Mexico in early January. Major Morrow and a strong force of the 9th Cavalry with artillery caught him at Percha Creek on the eastern slopes of the Black Range, west of Hillsboro, New Mexico. Morrow had one man killed and Nana later said the Apaches had 6 killed. Victorio continued on northward.

San Mateo Mountains, 33.55°N 107.43°W, January 17, 1880. Returning to his old home in Ojo Caliente, Victorio attempted to negotiate terms of surrender that would allow him and his followers to remain at Ojo Caliente. Failing that, he fought the 9th cavalry in the San Mateo Mountains, probably near Vicks Mountain (named after him), killing one American officer and eluding capture or defeat.

Caballo Mountains, 33.13°N 107.21°W, January 30, 1880. Captain Rucker and a 9th cavalry contingent crossed the Rio Grande river and approximately one mile east of the river the Apache lured him into an ambush. The army had several horses killed and one soldier wounded before they were able to withdraw.

Aleman, 33.00°N 106.9°W (approximate), February 3, 1880. Victorio entered the Jornada del Muerto pursued by Major Morrow with 5 companies of cavalry (~150 men) and Indian scouts. He had a skirmish with the 9th Cavalry which cost the soldiers one dead, and Victorio many of his horses. Morrow reported several Indians killed. The 10th Cavalry of Buffalo Soldiers was called in from Fort Bliss, Texas to assist in the hunt for Victorio.

San Andres Mountains, 32.92°N 106.55°W, February 9, 1880. The Apache routed a company of the 9th Cavalry in Hospital Canyon, driving them from the mountains, and capturing supplies. Major Morrow and much of the 9th Cavalry retired from the field, exhausted and short of horses after chasing Victorio for the previous month.

Rio Grande Valley, 32.86°N 107.29°W (approximate), March 1880. War parties sent out by Victorio raided with impunity settlements along the Rio Grande for livestock, supplies, and ammunition, killing at least 20 civilians. The cavalry, having lost many horses, rested and resupplied during the month and prepared to take on an expanded campaign against Victorio.

Hembrillo Basin, 32.924°N 106.645°W (approximate), April 5–8, 1880. In the largest battle of the war in numbers engaged. More than 500 soldiers and Indian scouts attempted to encircle Victorio's camp. Not all the U.S. troops found their way to the battlefield and after skirmishing at long distance Victorio withdrew successfully. The U.S. had two dead and three Apache bodies were reported found on the battlefield.

Mescalero Reservation, 33.16°N 105.77°W, April 16, 1880. In the aftermath of the Battle of Hembrillo Basin, 1,000 U.S. soldiers descended upon the Mescalero reservation. In an effort to cut off Victorio from men and supplies provided him by the Mescaleros, the soldiers imprisoned many of the men and killed 14 who resisted or attempted to flee.

Alma, 33.38°N 108.90°W, April 28, 1880. His forces divided into several war bands, Victorio raged through the rugged Mogollon Mountains, killing a reported 41 civilians, including the Alma Massacre.

Fort Tularosa, 33.88°N 108.54°W, May 14, 1880. In the Battle of Fort Tularosa about 100 Apaches attacked a makeshift fort defended by 25 soldiers of the 9th Cavalry. Local residents of Aragon, New Mexico also took refuge in the fort. Nobody was hurt among the defenders and they claimed to have inflicted several casualties on Victorio's Apaches.

Palomas Creek, 33.14°N 107.80°W, May 24, 1880. A force of approximately 60 Apache scouts headed by Chief of Scouts Henry K. Parker surrounded and surprised Victorio and a large number of his followers. They killed about 30 men, women, and children before running out of ammunition and withdrawing. Victorio was wounded. This was the first major defeat of Victorio, and it was accomplished by Apache scouts rather than soldiers. After this defeat, Victorio divided his followers into several groups and fled toward Mexico.

Deming, 32.23°N 107.43°W (approximate), June 5, 1880. Tracking Victorio's forces south to Mexico, Parker's Apache scouts found a group of Apaches and killed 10 of them, including Victorio's son Washington, who had a reputation as a fierce warrior.

Northern Mexico, June and early July 1880. Victorio raided ranches and settlements in northern Mexico to gather supplies and livestock, with the apparent intention of driving the livestock to New Mexico, especially the Mescalero Reservation, to trade for arms and ammunition. In July, several Mexican soldiers and Apaches were killed in clashes between Victorio and Mexican military forces.

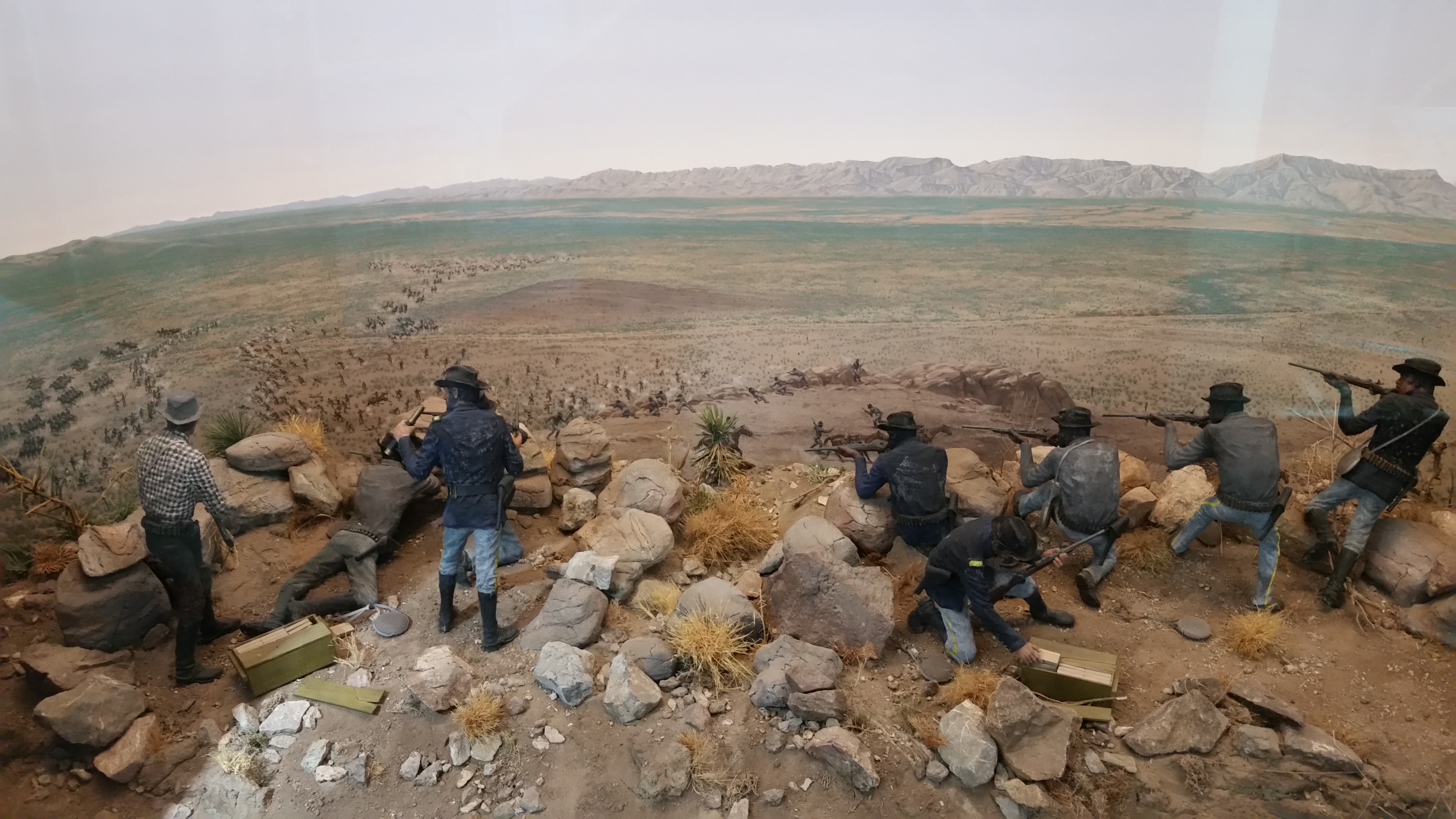
Artist's depiction of the Battle of Quitman Canyon, also called Tinaja de las Palmas

Tinaja de las Palmas (or Quitman Canyon), 31.01°N 105.24°W, July 30, 1880. Victorio crossed the Rio Grande into Texas and encountered the 10th Cavalry of Colonel Benjamin Grierson. Rather than chasing Victorio, Grierson's strategy was to station soldiers at strategic locations, such as the infrequent waterholes in the deserts of Trans-Pecos Texas. Grierson and three companies of African-American soldiers prevented Victorio and 125 warriors from accessing the Tinaja (waterhole) de las Palmas. One soldier was killed. Grierson claimed to have killed 7 Apaches.

Rattlesnake Springs, 31.35°N 104.86°W, August 6, 1880. Badly in need of water and probably attempting to return to New Mexico, Victorio headed north from Mexico toward Rattlesnake Springs, Texas. After a grueling march, Grierson beat him to Rattlesnake Springs. Victorio made several attempts to reach the water in the springs, but was fended off by the soldiers. Grierson had 3 dead, but estimated that he had killed or wounded 30 Apaches. Victorio turned back to Mexico after the battle, unable to reach territory familiar to him in New Mexico. A mountain and canyon in the area are named for Victorio.

Fort Quitman, 31.03°N 105.35°W (approximate), August 10, 1880. Returning to Mexico, Victorio attacked a stagecoach and killed the driver and wounded a passenger, James. J. Byrne, a general during the American Civil War. Byrne died a few days later.

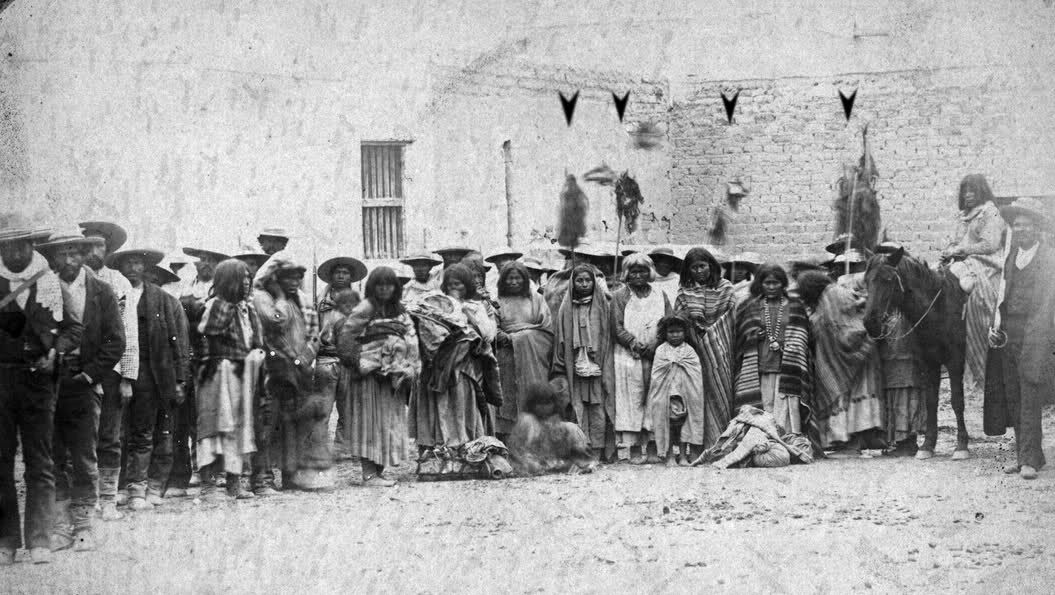
Apache prisoners and Mexican soldiers after the Battle of Tres Castillos

Tres Castillos, 29.97°N 105.78°W, October 14–15, 1880. Victorio took refuge in the desert of northern Mexico, sending out two raiding parties in search of badly needed ammunition and horses. A Mexican force of 250 men encircled his encampment and killed 62 men and boys, including Victorio, and 16 women and children, taking 68 women and children prisoners. Three Mexicans were killed. Nana was leading a raiding party and was not present during the battle. Victorio's sister, Lozen, was one of the few Apaches to escape the battle. Author Dan L. Thrapp called the battle a "massacre" as Victorio had little ammunition to resist the attack.

Ojo Caliente (Texas), 31.06°N 105.58°W (approximate), October 28, 1880. Thirty-five Apaches en route to reinforce Victorio ambushed and killed 5 soldiers of the 10th Cavalry near the Rio Grande and Fort Quitman, Texas. This would be the single worst day (in terms of deaths) for the 10th Cavalry until June 21, 1916, at the Battle of Carrizal.

=== 1881 ===
Carrizo Canyon, August 12, 1881. Nineteen soldiers and Captain Parker from K Troop of the 9th Cavalry, from Fort Wingate chased Nana's band of about forty to sixty Apaches into the Carrizo Canyon. Five Apaches were killed, two Privates from the 9th Cavalry were killed, and Nana escaped. Sergeant Thomas Shaw was awarded the Medal of Honor.

Battle of Cuchillo Negro Creek, August 16, 1881. Lieutenant Gustavus Valois and I Troop of the 9th Cavalry, on patrol from Fort Craig, encountered an exhausted Mexican who informed the cavalry that Nana's Apaches killed his family at his nearby ranch. Lieutenant George R. Burnett and 15 soldiers from I Troop along with Mexican volunteers (a combined force of about 50 men) searched for Nana's warriors and found the mutilated family. The soldiers followed the Apache trail and found Nana's group of about 40 to 60 warriors disguised as Mexicans near the foothills of the Black Range at Chuchillo Negro Creek. The Apaches opened fire and a prolonged engagement followed, with the Apaches retreating into the mountains. At one point, the soldiers thought their commanding officer was retreating (his horse ran away) and began to retreat, but were brought back to the fight. At dark, Nana and his warriors dispersed into the mountain. Two of the 9th Cavalry were wounded and six of the cavalry's horses were killed. Private Augustus Walley, First Sergeant Moses Williams, and Lieutenant George Burnett all received the Medal of Honor for their actions on this day.

Gavilan Canyon, August 19, 1881. Lieutenant George W. Smith and B Troop of the 9th Cavalry, on patrol from Fort Cummings were ambushed by Chief Nana and his Apache band in the Gavilan Canyon (a stream bed between the Mimbres Mountains and the Mimbres River, to the south of Carrizo Canyon). Smith and three troopers were immediately killed. Sergeant Brent Woods took command after a brief period of confusion and led a charge up the canyon wall against the Apaches. Nana and his warriors retreated. Reinforcements arrived to give chase, but Nana and his band escaped back to Mexico. Sergeant Woods received the Medal of Honor for his actions.

== Bibliography ==
- Karl W. Laumbach, Hembrillo, an Apache Battlefield of the Victorio War, 2000
- Kendall D. Gott, In Search of an Elusive Enemy: The Victorio campaign, 1879-1880, Combat Studies Institute Press
- John Wilson, Victorio's War, Orca Book Publishers, 2012

== See also ==
- Apache-Mexico Wars
- Apache Wars
- Geronimo
- Canada Alamosa, New Mexico
