= Battle of Hembrillo Basin =

1880 battle in Victorio's War

Coordinates: 32.924°N 106.645°W

- Part of the Apache Wars, Victorio's War
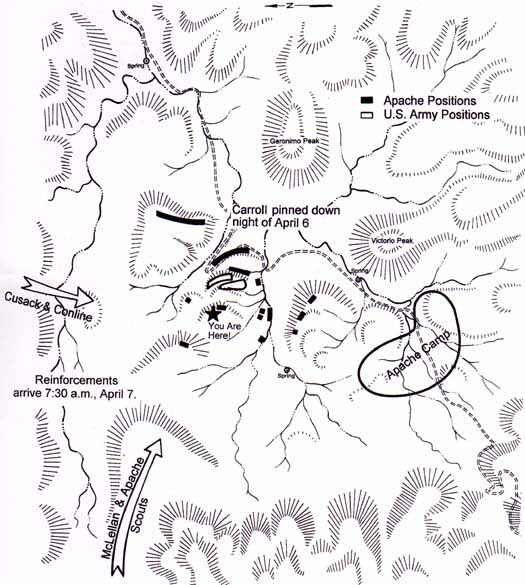
- A map of the engagement in Hembrillo Basin. Note that N is to the left on this map.
Date	April 5–8, 1880
Location	Hembrillo Basin, Doña Ana County, New Mexico
Result	Apache victory, women and children evacuated and U.S. Army kept at bay

Belligerents
United States	Apache

Commanders and leaders
(United States) Henry Carroll	Victorio

Strength
c. 220 cavalry, 150 Indian scouts	~150 warriors

Casualties and losses
2 killed 5 wounded	Perhaps 3 dead

The Battle of Hembrillo Basin was fought April 5–8, 1880 between the United States Army against a combined band of Chiricahua and Mescalero Apaches led by Chief Victorio. Hembrillo Basin was the largest battle of Victorio's War, although casualties were light on both sides. Victorio held off an attack by superior numbers of army soldiers and Indian scouts, evacuated his women and children from the battlefield, and withdrew successfully. Hembrillo Basin is located on the White Sands Missile Range and access by the public is strictly regulated.

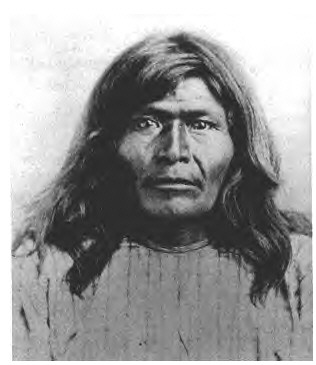
Victorio was the Apache leader.

Forced out of one of his strongholds, Victorio engaged in a running battle with thousands of American and Mexico troops which would end with his defeat and death by the Mexican army a few months later.

== Background ==
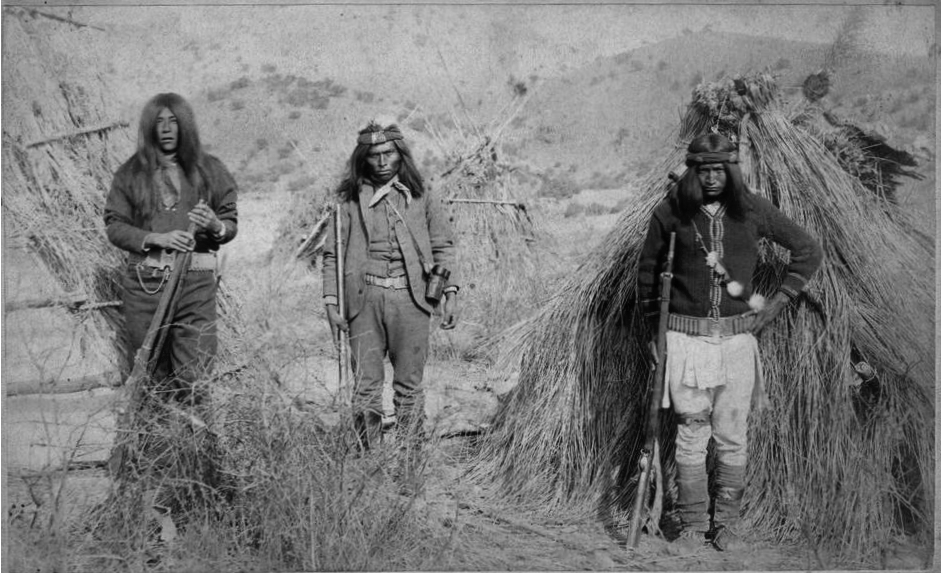
Left to right: "Massai", "Apache Kid", and "Rowdy" pictured in a March 1886 photograph taken by C. S. Fly at Geronimo's camp.

Facing forced relocation to San Carlos Apache Indian Reservation in Arizona, Victorio, a veteran warrior and Mimbres Chiricahua Apache chief, fled the Mescalero Reservation in Otero County, New Mexico on 21 August 1879 with approximately 80 warriors and their wives and children. His band was soon augmented by additional followers from the Mescalero and other Apache bands. The U.S. army pursued Victorio and the army and the Apache fought a number of skirmishes and battles which proved indecisive with the Apaches escaping and continuing their flight over southern New Mexico and eventually into western Texas and Mexico.

In March 1880, Pueblo Indian scouts discovered that Victorio had taken refuge in Hembrillo Basin, located on the western slopes of the San Andres Mountains. To attack the Apache, the army commander Colonel Edward Hatch divided his force into four groups. The main assault would be carried out by Major Morrow and about 100 soldiers plus a few Indian scouts who would attack from the north and Captain McClellan who would attack with 85 soldiers and 40 Indian scouts (led by Lt. Charles B. Gatewood) from the south. Captain Carroll with more than 100 men of the 9th Cavalry, composed of African-American soldiers, would support the assault by advancing up the Hembrillo Valley from the west. Captain Hooker with more than 100 soldiers and some Navajo scouts would station themselves on the eastern side of the San Andres Mountains to block the escape route of the Apache. The attack on the Apache camp was scheduled to take place on April 8. Victorio would thus be surrounded by American troops.

The plans quickly went awry. Major Morrow's northern force was delayed because of a lack of water and he never reached the battlefield. Unaware of Morrow's problems, Captain Carroll and his Buffalo Soldiers advanced up the Hembrillo Valley on April 5. Carroll sent 29 soldiers and two Indian guides under Lt. John Conline ahead as scouts. Conline discovered a trail recently traveled by horses and cattle and advanced carefully.

== Battle ==
AT 5:30 on April 5, Lt. Conlin, advancing up the Hembrillo Valley, discerned 35 to 50 Apaches advancing on his force. Conlin sat up a skirmish line and a firefight ensued. Two soldiers were wounded. The Apache broke off the attack at nightfall, and Conlin retreated back to the main force headed by Captain Carroll. One of Conlin's scouts recognized Victorio as personally leading the attack.

Carroll was worried that the Apache might flee and he organized an advance on them the next day, April 6. He initially split his force, sending two companies up Conlin's route, and leading two companies of 71 men via an alternate route from the northwest to try to surprise the Apache. However, he had second thoughts about splitting his force and ordered it reunited, but continued his advance. Late in the afternoon he entered Hembrillo Basin with his two companies, the other two companies now following him at a distance. Carroll deployed his two companies in a V-shape and advanced, but the Apache occupied higher ground and opened fire at long range. Carroll captured a small ridge, but found himself surrounded by the Apache and cut off from access to a nearby spring, the only water near him. The Apache broke off the fight at nightfall and Carroll settled in for the night.

Carroll spent an uncomfortable, waterless night and the next morning, April 7, the Apache began to close in on him. He was saved from further casualties by the arrival of additional army soldiers and Indian scouts. The two companies of his command several miles in his rear had been unaware of his plight and spent the night outside the basin, but they advanced into the basin that morning. Also, arriving at the basin that morning was Capt. McClellan with his 85 American soldiers, including a company of Buffalo soldiers, 40 Indian scouts, and 100 White Mountain Apache, enemies of the Chiricuahua. The soldiers advanced on the Apache positions while Lt. Gatewood led the Apache scouts in a flank attack on the Apache encampment, populated with women and children. Now faced with a force of nearly 400 soldiers and Indian scouts, Victorio began a withdrawal. He removed his warriors encircling Carroll to a high ridge south of the battlefield and held the army forces at bay for a few hours while the Apache women and children fled the area. Victorio then withdrew his men in stages, with a rear guard remaining vigilant until the next morning, April 8, when it retreated after a brief skirmish.

Fought at long range, there were few casualties on either side. Two Buffalo Soldiers were mortally wounded and five more soldiers wounded, including Captain Carroll. Scouts reported finding 3 Apache bodies. No casualties among the Indian scouts were reported. The Battle of Hembrillo Basin was the largest battle of Victorio's War in terms of the numbers engaged.

The great majority of the U.S. forces engaged were either African-American Buffalo Soldiers or Apache scouts. Accounts by white officers of the battle portrayed the Buffalo Soldiers as getting sick on bad water and stumbling accidentally into contact with Victorio. Actually, the 9th Cavalry of Buffalo Soldiers found Victorio's encampment and, although outnumbered, aggressively engaged him until other units, also consisting mostly of Buffalo Soldiers and Indian scouts could arrive at the battlefield.

== Aftermath ==
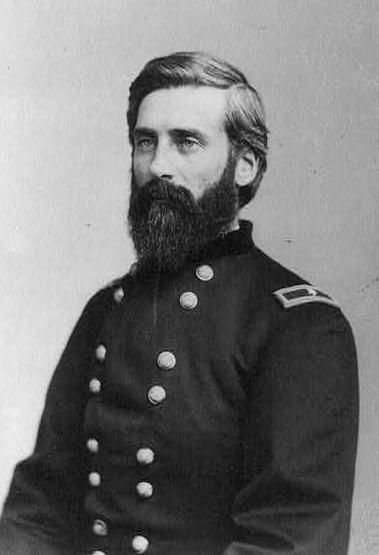
Although arriving late to the battlefield, Colonel Edward Hatch was the commander of the U.S. forces engaged.

Victorio and his followers retired westward from Hembrillo Basin and were not seen again until April 28 when his warriors killed up to 41 civilians in the Alma Massacre and May 14 when he attacked Fort Tularosa near present-day Aragon, New Mexico, 200 kilometres (120 mi) northwest of the Hembrillo Basin.

The army believed with reason that some of the Mescaleros living on their reservation about 70 kilometres (43 mi) distant from the battlefield were providing Victorio with supplies and men. After the escape of Victorio from Hembrillo Basin, Colonel Hatch ordered all U.S. forces in the area to converge on the Mescalero reservation near Fort Stanton. A few days after the battle 1,000 soldiers arrived on the reservation. The 400 Mescaleros, including 65 men, living on the reservation scattered, fearing they were to be forcibly removed from their lands. On April 16, Hatch began capturing the Mescaleros and confiscating all weapons and horses. Fourteen Mescalero men were killed during the roundup. The captured Mescaleros were initially detained in a horse stable with a floor six inches deep in manure. After a week or so, they were released from the stable but they remained detained for about four months. Some fled to Mexico or joined Victorio.

== Archaeology ==
In 1988, archaeologists from Human Systems Research, Inc., a non-profit organization, were contracted by the U.S. military to survey the Hembrillo Basin battleground. Their survey found rock art and other artifacts indicating that the Hembrillo Basin with its springs of potable water, rare in the surrounding desert, had long been a sacred site for Native Americans.

Moreover, the archaeologists were able to provide insights into the battle, especially the tactics of Victorio. During a 10-year analysis, over 800 cartridges were discovered, tagged, and positioned with GPS. Forensic analysis revealed that the cartridges were fired from 147 unique rifles and carbines, and 39 separate pistols. The location of the cartridges indicated the control and management Victorio exercised over his warriors. Warriors armed with short-range 1873 Winchester repeating rifles were stationed at a spring to prevent the army from accessing water. Warriors with longer range rifles were stationed on ridge tops to fire down on the advancing American troops, keeping the attackers at a distance of 600 yards (550 m). "Victorio's Apache were doing what they did best, fighting a defensive battle with a mountain at their back." During Victorio's withdrawal, he maneuvered his men from ridgetop to ridgetop to hold off the attackers.

Officers from nearby White Sands Missile Range and Fort Bliss are frequently given staff tours of the battlefield to increase knowledge of small unit tactics against overwhelming odds. Artifacts, such as rifle cartridges, from the battle are still found in the 21st century.

== See also ==
- List of battles won by Indigenous peoples of the Americas
- Victorio Peak
- Navajo Wars
