= Thomas Shaw (Medal of Honor) =

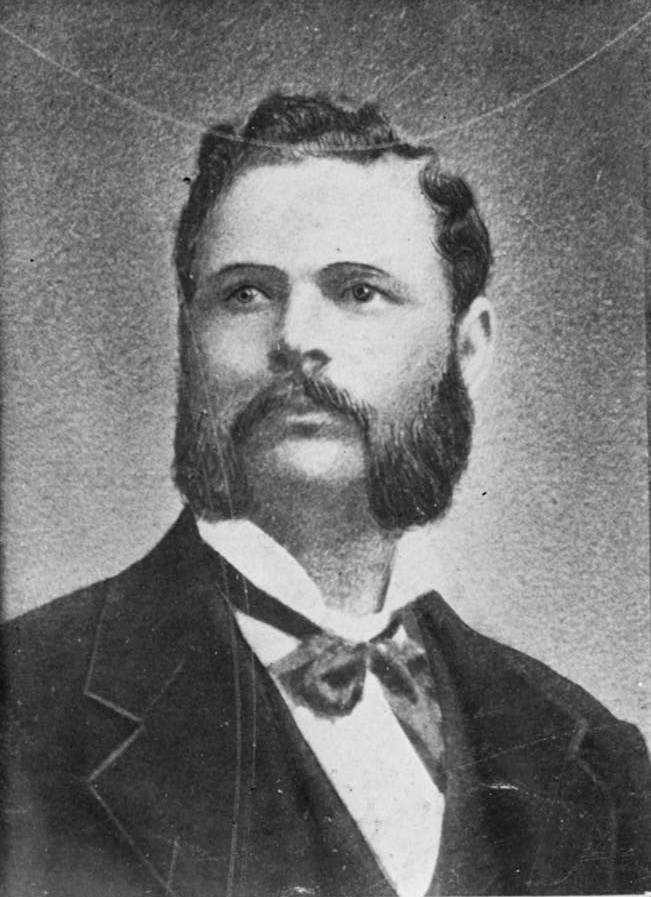
- Sergeant Thomas Shaw
- Born: c. 1846; Covington, Kentucky
- Died: June 23, 1895 (aged 48–49)
- Burial place: Arlington National Cemetery
- Military career
- Allegiance: United States
- Branch: United States Army
- Service years: 1864-1894
- Rank: Sergeant
- Units: 67th U.S. Colored Troops; 9th Cavalry Regiment
- Conflicts: American Indian Wars
- Awards: Medal of Honor

Thomas Shaw (c. 1846 – June 23, 1895) was a Buffalo Soldier in the United States Army and a recipient of America's highest military decoration – the Medal of Honor – for his actions in the Indian Wars of the western United States.

== Biography ==
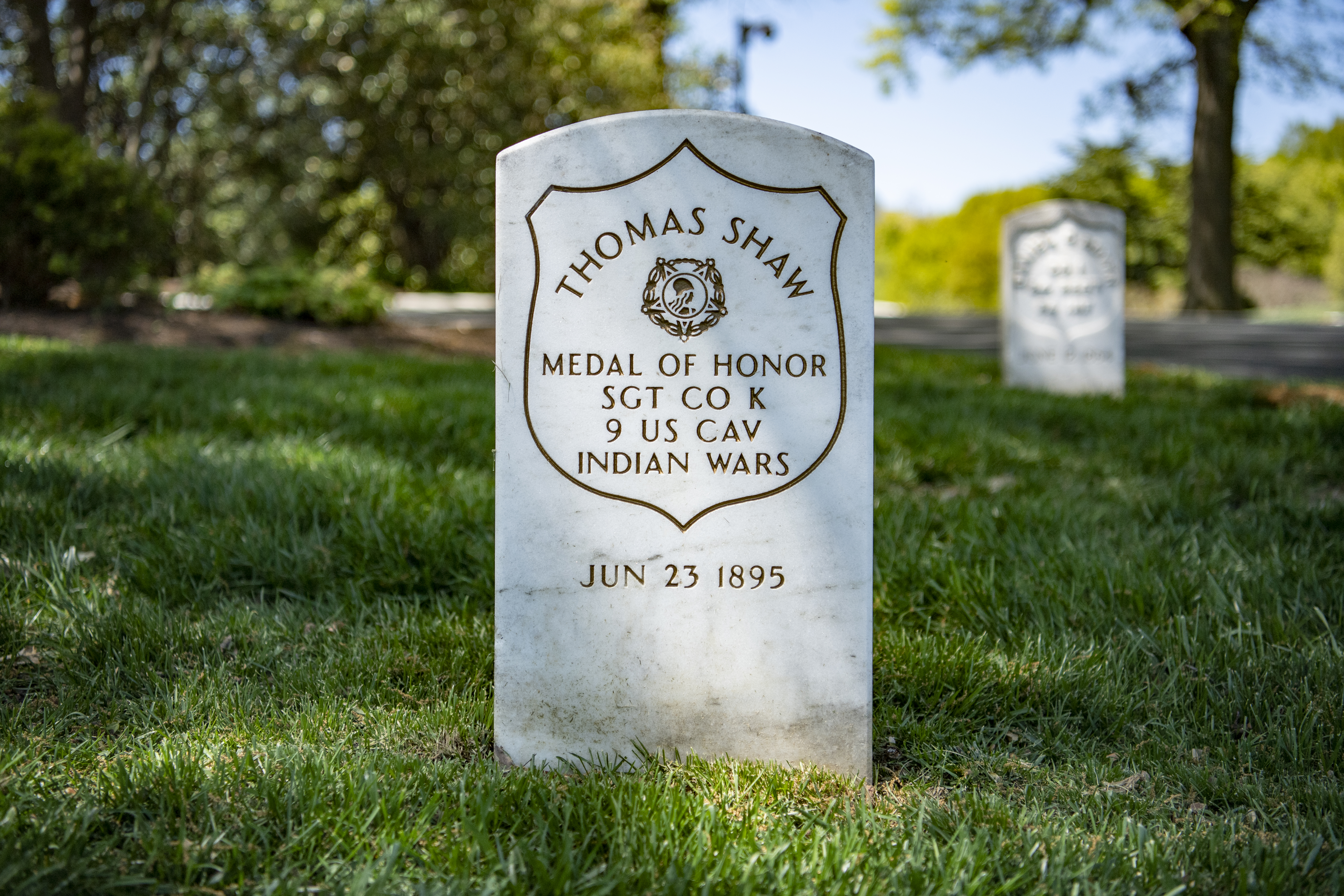
Grave at Arlington National Cemetery

Thomas Shaw was born into slavery in Covington, Kentucky in about 1846. Shaw's owner moved him to Pike County, Missouri, and from there, Shaw escaped his owner and walked into a Union Army recruiting station. Shaw was stationed with the 67th U.S. Colored Troops in 1864 and stayed with the Army after the Civil War.

By August 12, 1881, was serving as a Sergeant in Company K of the 9th Cavalry Regiment. On that day he participated in the Battle of Carrizo Canyon at Carrizo Canyon in New Mexico. The 9th Cavalry were in pursuit of Nana and his band of Apache warriors (Victorio's War). For his actions during the engagement, Shaw was awarded the Medal of Honor nine years later, on December 7, 1890.

Shaw retired from the Army in 1894 and settled in Rosslyn, Virginia.

Shaw died in 1895, leaving a wife and a daughter and was buried in Arlington National Cemetery, Arlington County, Virginia.

== Medal of Honor citation ==
Rank and organization: Sergeant, Company K, 9th U.S. Cavalry. Place and date: At Carrizo Canyon, N. Mex., August 12, 1881. Entered service at: Pike County, Mo. Birth: Covington, Ky. Date of issue: December 7, 1890.

Citation

Forced the enemy back after stubbornly holding his ground in an extremely exposed position and prevented the enemy's superior numbers from surrounding his command.

== See also ==
- List of African American Medal of Honor recipients
- List of Medal of Honor recipients for the Indian Wars
