= J. Minos Simon =

American lawyer and activist

- Born: February 27, 1922; Nunez, Vermilion Parish; Louisiana, USA
- Died: March 11, 2004 (aged 82); Arnaudville; St. Landry Parish, Louisiana
- Education: Kaplan High School University of Wisconsin–Madison; Louisiana State University Louisiana State University Law Center
- Occupation: Attorney
- Political party: Democratic
- Spouse: Jeanie Holmes Simon

Joseph Minos Simon Sr. (February 27, 1922 – March 11, 2004) was an American author, lecturer, aviator, sportsman, and attorney from Lafayette, Louisiana, who was particularly known for his courtroom theatrics and demeanor.

== Early years and education ==
J. Minos Simon was born to Amar Simon and the former Elvina Bouillion in the community of Nunez in western Vermilion Parish, Louisiana. He was reared in a poor family and spoke only French as a child, but he learned to speak English in grade school. As was typical of early Cajun life, he worked in rice and cotton fields and traveled in horse-drawn buggies and wagons.

When Simon was a fourth grader, his parents moved to Kaplan. He graduated from Kaplan High School in 1939. After high school, he served for one year in the U.S. Marine Corps before being medically discharged. He attended both the University of Wisconsin–Madison and Louisiana State University in Baton Rouge.

He graduated from the Louisiana State University Law Center in 1946 and was admitted as a member of the Louisiana State Bar the same year. He was admitted to practice before the United States Fifth Circuit Court of Appeals in New Orleans in 1949 and before the United States Supreme Court in 1960.

Simon was a breeder of thoroughbred horses on his ranch. After his death, the Simon estate was still running a thoroughbred named "Boyish Charm." He was an avid jogger and participated in scuba diving, deep-sea fishing, and hunting large and small game, including alligators. He was an airplane pilot and boat captain for more than two decades.

He was the author of two books about Louisiana and its legal heritage: Law in the Cajun Nation (1993), in collaboration with David Leon Chandler, and The Devil in the Law: A Judicial Moral Juridical Decline (1999). The latter book, with legal scales on the cover, was well received in the anti-abortion activist community. Simon was a strong opponent of abortion.

Simon was a lecturer on topics dear to Acadiana. Prior to his death, the "Living Legends" executive committee inducted Simon into the "Order of Living Legends." "Living Legends" lectures, which are free and open to the public, recognize and honor those persons who have helped to mold and define Cajun culture. The program is sponsored by the Acadian Museum of Erath.

Simon also lectured at many legal seminars and symposia. Warren A. Perrin, President of the interest group known as the Council for the Development of French in Louisiana, or CODOFIL, said that Simon had "been a mentor and inspiration for many young attorneys . . . [who was] always willing to share his experience with others..."

Simon was involved in a controversial ruling that allowed a local farmer, John Trahan, to give away his deceased wife's property to settle debts in 1937. The property was titled to Adeline Duhon's heirs, whom were minors at the time. Simon allowed Trahan to forge a document stating that his wife died without heirs. This went to court in 1967 and was upheld due to the statute of limitations.

== Trial lawyer for 56 years ==
Simon opened his own law office in 1943. Simon served as a trial lawyer in both civil and criminal cases in both state and federal courts in a career that exceeded a half century. He handled thousands of cases. He was known for his high-profile civil and criminal cases throughout Louisiana. A computer search several years ago disclosed that he presented to higher courts for adjudication more than 551 reported cases, 459 of which were presented to the Appellate and Supreme courts of Louisiana and 105 cases to the federal courts, 29 of which went to the United States Supreme Court.

In 1981, Simon was the attorney for three junior high school girls who sought to remain at Buckeye High School in Rapides Parish despite a desegregation order to the contrary from U.S. District Judge Nauman Scott of Alexandria. In order to remain at the Buckeye school, the custody of the girls, who the media dubbed "the Buckeye Three," was transferred to state Judge Richard "Dick" Lee.

In the mid-1970s, Simon represented John K. Snyder, who was mayor of Alexandria from 1973 to 1977 and again from 1982 to 1986, in a series of city and personal legal matters which stemmed from grievances that Snyder had against various public agencies or political opponents.

== Defending chiropractors and children ==
As early as 1965, Simon was working to permit chiropractors to have the same standing in the medical profession as other doctors of medicine. He represented a chiropractor known as Jerry England. Simon devoted eight years pressing to overturn a Louisiana statute which limited the licensed, legal practice of chiropractic to those who held a doctorate from a school of medicine. Although Simon was not successful, and the England case was ultimately decided in favor of the state medical board, Simon was credited by the Louisiana Chiropractic Association for laying the groundwork for the eventual recognition of chiropractors as bona fide medical professionals.

Simon also took an early lead in the filing of numerous civil suits against the Roman Catholic Church on behalf of children who were sexually abused by priests, the Reverend Gilbert Gauthe in particular, and other church workers. Simon once named Pope John Paul II as a defendant in a legal motion. Simon knew that the criminality involved in the scandal was not simply a matter of a rogue priest, but that high church officials were willfully ignoring the crimes of their priests. Suing the pope might have been a technicality; but the damaging headlines and lawsuits were a warning to the Vatican that church officials in Louisiana were ignoring the extent of the problem.

== Running for attorney general, 1971 ==
In 1971, Simon entered the Democratic primary for Louisiana attorney general in an unsuccessful effort to succeed the scandal-plagued Jack P.F. Gremillion. Simon was not well known statewide at the time of the campaign though he had been an attorney for the controversial Teamsters Union business agent Edward Grady Partin of Baton Rouge. Simon failed to make the pivotal runoff primary. Instead, the nomination was secured by a state senator from New Orleans, William J. Guste Jr., who defeated senatorial colleague George T. Oubre of St. James Parish, and then crushed the Republican nominee, Tom Stagg, in the general election. In 1974, Stagg became a judge of the United States District Court for the Western District of Louisiana.

== Simon's obituary ==
Simon died at his residence in Arnaudville near Lafayette but in St. Landry Parish. His obituary said, accordingly, "He was a trial attorney of fifty-six years, who actively engaged life in many respects. While his legendary legal talents speak for themselves, he was an avid sportsman who was as comfortable quoting the great philosophers, as he was hunting alligators in the marshes of Louisiana. He loved hunting, fishing, scuba diving, and horse racing. He was a published author and an accomplished aviator, and without question, a man who fully embraced life on all levels. He expressly wanted to be remembered as one who dearly loved his family, friends, clients, and country."

Simon was survived by his wife, Jeanie Holmes Simon of Arnaudville; two daughters, Michelle Simon Eckert of Baton Rouge and Suzette Simon Tardo of Lafayette; three sons, Joseph Minos "Jay" Simon Jr., of Baton Rouge, Joseph Clemille "Cle" Simon of Lafayette, and Joseph Quentin Simon of Lafayette; two stepdaughters, Jodi Fulton Benton of Baton Rouge and Jennifer Reeves LaBorde of Pensacola, Florida; ten grandchildren; ten step-grandchildren; thirty-two step-great-grandchildren.
