= 100 Tons of Gold =

1978 book by David Leon Chandler

- First edition
- Author: David Leon Chandler
- Genre: History
- Publisher: Doubleday Press
- Publication date: 1978
- Publication place: United States
- Media type: Print
- Pages: 200 pages, plates, map
- ISBN: 0385127383
- OCLC: 3361037
- Dewey Decimal: 978.9/66
- LC Class: F802.S15 C46

100 Tons of Gold is a non-fiction book written by David Leon Chandler and published by Doubleday in 1978. It chronicles the search for gold treasure inside the Victorio Peak, New Mexico.
