= What Men Call Treasure =

2008 book by Robert Boswell and David Schweidel

What Men Call Treasure: The Search for Gold at Victorio Peak
- Front cover of What Men Call Treasure
- Author: Robert Boswell and David Schweidel
- Language: English
- Genre: History
- Publisher: Cinco Punto Press
- Publication date: 2008
- Publication place: United States
- Media type: Print (hardcover)
- Pages: 341 pp
- ISBN: 978-1-933693-21-7

What Men Call Treasure: The Search for Gold at Victorio Peak is a 2008 non-fiction book by Robert Boswell and David Schweidel chronicling the search for gold treasure inside Victorio Peak, New Mexico.
