= Certificate of Merit Medal =

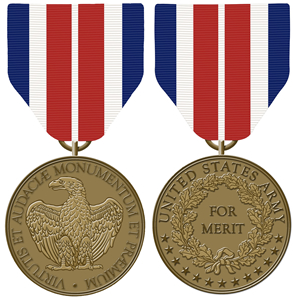
- Obverse and reverse of the Certificate of Merit Medal
- Type: Military medal (Decoration)
- Presented by: Department of War
- Status: Obsolete
- Established: March 3, 1847
- Final award: May 1918 (Last recognized act); May 1919 (Last medal presented)

Highlights
- Total: 1,211
- Certificate of Merit Medal ribbon

Precedence
- Next (higher): Medal of Honor
- Equivalent: Distinguished Service Cross
- Next (lower): Campaign and medals

The Certificate of Merit Medal was a military decoration of the United States Army that was issued between the years of 1905 and 1918. The Certificate of Merit Medal replaced the much older Certificate of Merit which was authorized by the United States Congress on March 3, 1847.

== History ==
The system of military awards and decorations presented to members of the United States Military can trace its lineage to the Badge of Military Merit. This military award, established by George Washington, was given in recognition of soldiers who displayed unusual gallantry or extraordinary fidelity. Awarded three times during the Revolutionary War, the Badge of Military Merit was not awarded again. Thus, for more than 50 years the United States Military had no official military decorations.

=== Original Certificate of Merit ===
The original Certificate of Merit was authorized by an Act of Congress related to the expansion of the US Army during the Mexican–American War (1846–1848). The legislation authorized brevets to non-commissioned officers and for privates who distinguished themselves in service "the President may in like manner grant him a certificate of merit, which shall entitle him to additional pay at the rate of two dollars per month." This was a step forward in the recognition of the individual contributions of soldiers. The first certificates were only authorized for Privates and it was not until 1854 that the Certificate of Merit was awarded to NCOs the rank of Sergeant and above. The Certificate of Merit was never authorized for officers. During this period from at least 1865 to 1904, the Certificate was used as an equivalent to the Medal of Honor. This created a dilemma for some soldiers, who applied for both awards, hoping to benefit from the pay increase included with the Certificate, in spite of the fact that military protocol restricted them to only one decoration. George Jordan is an example of a soldier who received both. It was issued to 545 soldiers during the Mexican–American War. After the war, the Certificate of Merit was discontinued.

=== Reintroduced Certificate of Merit ===
Though the Army was of the position that it no longer had the authority to award the Certificate of Merit, commanders in the field continued to recommend soldiers for the award, but the Army did not act on the nominations. Following the Battle of Little Big Horn in 1876, the Certificate of Merit was reintroduced.

In 1892, the criteria for the Certificate of Merit was changed. Adjutant General's Circular number 2 dated 11 February 1892 stated:

Medals of honor should be awarded to officers or enlisted men for distinguished bravery in action, while certificates of merit should, under law, be awarded for distinguished service, whether in action or otherwise, of a valuable character to the United States as, for example, extraordinary exertion in the preservation of human life, or in the preservation of public property, or rescuing public property from destruction by fire or otherwise, or any hazardous service by which the Government is saved loss in men or material. Simple heroism in battle, on the contrary, is fitly rewarded by a medal of honor, although such act of heroism may not have resulted in any benefit to the United States. Where the conduct of an enlisted man, non-commissioned officer or private has been represented to merit both a medal of honor and a certificate of merit, recommendation may be made for both, either simultaneously or at different times.

Soldiers, both privates and non-commissioned officers, were eligible for award of a Certificate of Merit upon the recommendation of their regimental or corps commander. Service could be in peacetime or in time of war. These regulations remained in effect until 9 July 1918.

=== Certificate of Merit Medal ===
In 1905, a medal was created for those holding a Certificate of Merit and called the Certificate of Merit Medal. This medal was authorized for wear on a United States military uniform. It was always worn following the Medal of Honor, before all campaign medals. The first recipient of the Certificate of Merit Medal was First Lieutenant William B. Baker, who was presented medal No. 1 on 30 December 1907. Baker had received an original Certificate of Merit as a corporal during the Spanish–American War on 13 August 1898. The last act recognized by a Certificate of Merit was May 1918, when Corporal Paul Scaletta made a water rescue of soldiers in dangerous surf condition at Ocean Beach, California. The last soldier to be awarded the Certificate of Merit Medal was George Arrington for his service while a Private with the 24th Infantry Regiment in 1889. He was awarded medal No. 361, and subsequently converted it to a Distinguished Service Cross.

=== Conversion ===
The Certificate of Merit Medal was declared obsolete on July 19, 1918. Those holding the Certificate of Merit Medal could exchange their medal for the newly created Distinguished Service Medal. In 1934, Congress changed the regulation allowing the conversion of the medal to the Distinguished Service Cross, including those converted to the Distinguished Service Medal.

== Appearance ==
The medal is bronze, 1.25 inches in diameter. The obverse depicts an eagle facing left, with its wings partially spread. The eagle is surrounded by the inscription VIRTUTIS ET AUDACIAE MONUMENTUM ET PRAEMIUM (Virtue and Audacity are Their Own Monument and Reward).

The reverse of the medal bears the word, FOR MERIT surrounded by an oak wreath of two branches, the stems joined at the bottom by a bow. Around the edge in relief are the words, UNITED STATES ARMY at the top and thirteen stars below.

The suspension and service ribbon of the Certificate of Merit Medal is red, white and blue. It has two stripes of blue at the edges with equal stripes of white. A wide central stripe of red is bisected by a thin stripe of white.

== See also ==
- Medal of Honor
- Awards and decorations of the United States military
