= David Leon Chandler =

American journalist (1937–1994)

- Born: May 26, 1937; Covington, Kentucky
- Died: January 23, 1994 (aged 56); Denver
- Occupation: Journalist

David Leon Chandler (May 26, 1937 – January 23, 1994) was an American journalist who wrote several historical and biographical books during the 1970s and 1980s. He was associated with early coverage of the Kennedy Assassination and was mentioned in the Warren Commission report.

== Biography ==
Chandler was born in Covington, Kentucky. Following service in the merchant marine and U.S. Navy, Chandler worked three years from 1959 for The News-Herald in Panama City, Florida. Eventually he led a team whose investigation and coverage of corruption won the 1962 Pulitzer Prize for Public Service for the newspaper, citing its "three-year campaign against entrenched power and corruption, with resultant reforms in Panama City and Bay County." He worked for New Orleans' afternoon newspaper The States-Item 1962–1964 and then on contract with Life magazine, initially regarding the Kennedy assassination. Chandler ran for Governor of Louisiana in the 1971 Democratic Party primary "hoping to prove that a candidate could win the governorship without taking any campaign contributions"—and finished twelfth with 0.62% of the vote. From 1972 he was a reporter with the (Norfolk) Ledger-Star and the Associated Press, as well as a free-lance writer of magazine articles and books.

Chandler's books include Brothers in Blood (1975), a history of the Cosa Nostra; The Natural Superiority of Southern Politicians, (1977); 100 Tons of Gold about a mysterious gold horde in New Mexico; Henry Flagler: The Astonishing Life and Times of the Visionary Robber Baron Who Founded Florida (1986); The Binghams of Louisville (1988), a controversial biography of Robert Worth Bingham (who married Flagler's widow a year before her death); and The Jefferson Conspiracies (1994), about the death of Meriwether Lewis (released several months after Chandler's death).

He also ghost-wrote the autobiography of his friend, Lafayette Lawyer J. Minos Simon. Chandler lived in New Orleans during the late 1960s and 1970s where he resided in an apartment in a building owned by Clay Shaw.

He died in Denver at age 56. He was survived by his third wife Mary Voelz Chandler and by four children from previous marriages.

== Books ==
- The Dragon Variation: A History of the Mafia, Cosa Nostra, and Parent Societies from the Spanish Inquisition to the Present (Dutton, 1974), ISBN 0525095438
- Brothers in Blood: The Rise of Criminal Brotherhoods (Dutton, 1975); UK edition, The Criminal Brotherheads (Constable, 1976)
- The Natural Superiority of Southern Politicians: A Revisionist History (Doubleday, 1977)
- 100 Tons of Gold (Doubleday, 1978)
- Dialing for Data: A Consumer's How-to Handbook on Computer Communications (Random House, 1984)
- Henry Flagler: The Astonishing Life and Times of the Visionary Robber Baron Who Founded Florida (Macmillan, 1986)
- The Binghams of Louisville: The Dark History Behind One of America's Great Fortunes (Crown, 1987), by David Leon Chandler with Mary Voelz Chandler
- Law in the Cajun Nation (Lafayette, LA: Prescott Press, 1993), J. Minos Simon with Chandler
- The Jefferson Conspiracies: A President's Role in the Assassination of Meriwether Lewis (William Morrow & Company, 1994)
