= Aragon, New Mexico =

- Census-designated place
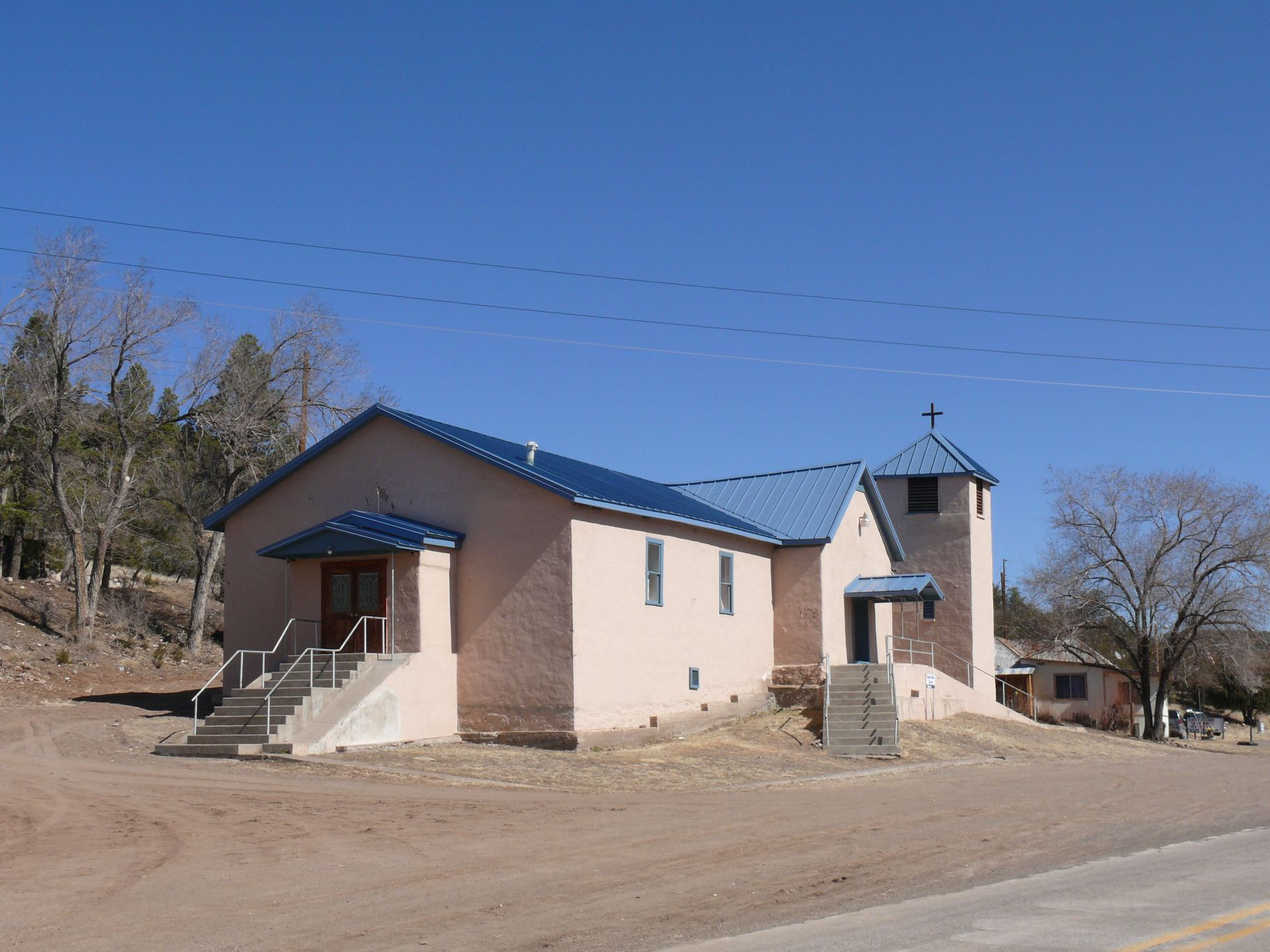
- Santo Niño church

- Location within the state of New Mexico
- Coordinates: 33°53′24″N 108°31′14″W
- Country: United States
- State: New Mexico
- County: Catron

Area
  - Total: 8.46 sq mi (21.90 km^{2})
  - Land: 8.46 sq mi (21.90 km^{2})
  - Water: 0.0039 sq mi (0.01 km^{2})
- Elevation: 7,054 ft (2,150 m)

Population (2020)
  - Total: 76
  - Density: 9.0/sq mi (3.47/km^{2})
- Time zone: UTC-5 (Mountain (MST))
  - Summer (DST): MDT
- ZIP code: 87820
- Area code: 575
- GNIS feature ID: 2584050

Aragon is a census-designated place on the Tularosa River in Catron County, New Mexico, United States. As of the 2020 census, Aragon had a population of 76. It is located 7 miles (11 km) northeast of Apache Creek.

== History ==
=== Old Fort Tularosa ===
Aragon is on the site of former Old Fort Tularosa 33°52′52″N 108°32′18″W, which was built in 1872 to protect the Apache Indian Agency from the Ojo Caliente Band of Apaches. The fort was abandoned when the tribe was moved back to the Ojo Caliente reservation in 1874. A stockade was built on the site of the earlier fort in 1880 by Buffalo Soldiers led by Sergeant George Jordan. Jordan eventually received the Medal of Honor for leading 25 men to repulse a force of more than 100 Indians in the Battle of Fort Tularosa.

The only remaining evidence of the fort is a burial ground for soldiers who served in the Arizona Territory.

=== The town ===
The town was known as "Joseph" from 1887 to 1898 and 1901 to 1906. Since 1906 it has been known as "Aragon", named for an old Spanish family who still lives in the area. Near Aragon, on the north side of Tularosa Canyon, a cave was occupied from 400 B.C. to A.D. 1100, containing pits and later masonry rooms.

== Demographics ==
Historical population
Census	Pop.	Note	%±
2020	76		—
U.S. Decennial Census

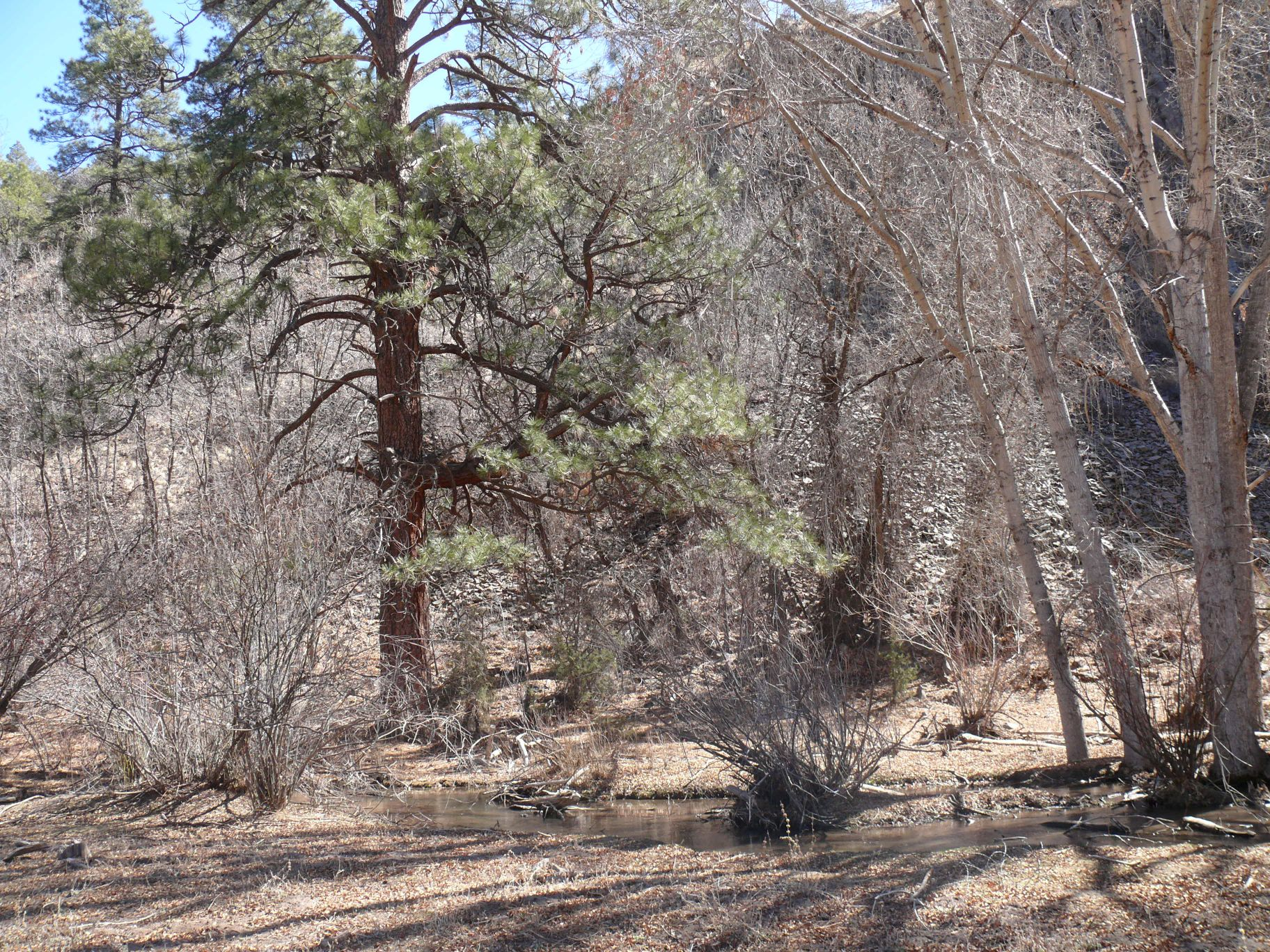
Stream in Aragon

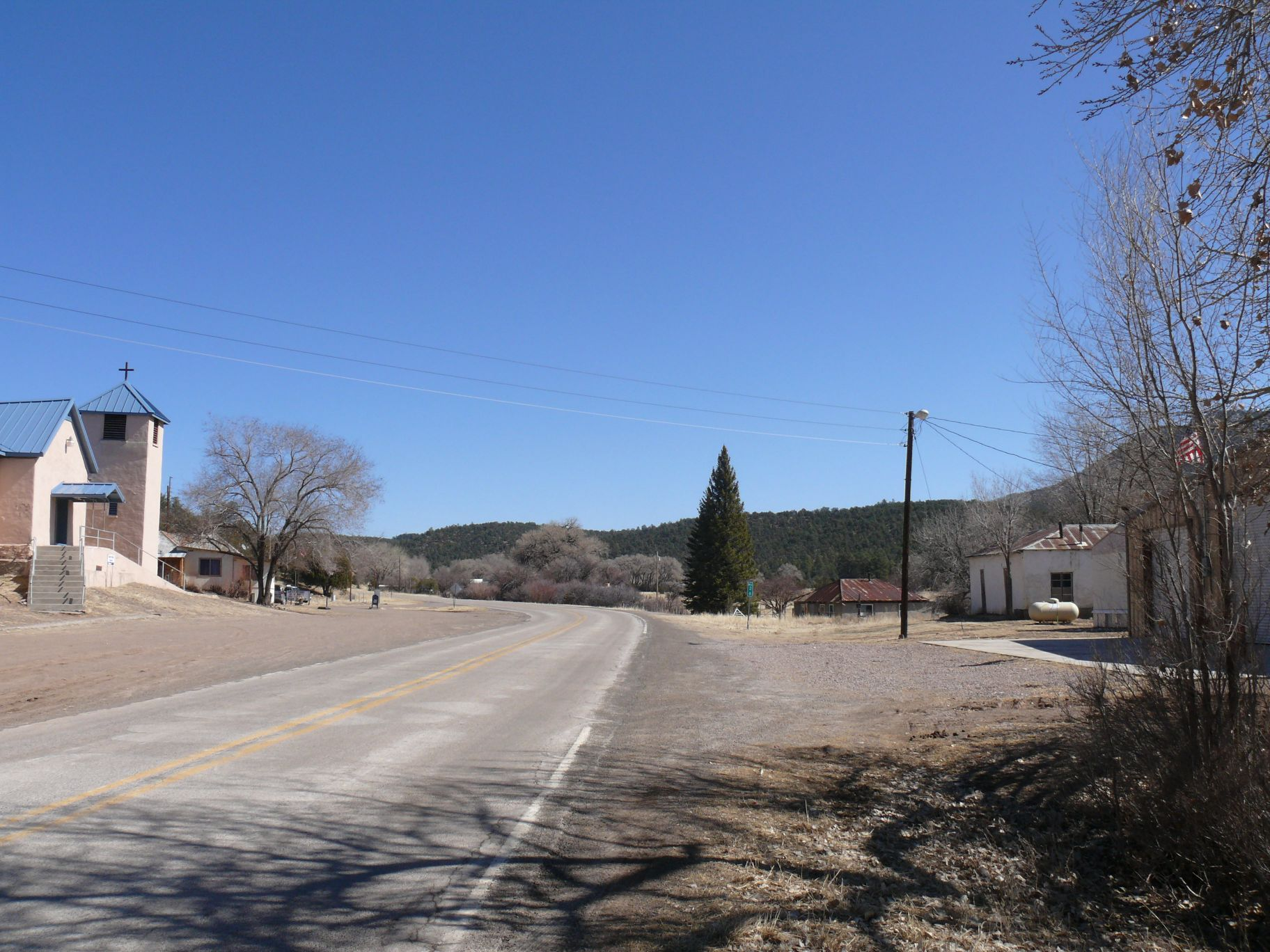
Road in Aragon

== Education ==
It is in the Reserve Independent School District.

== See also ==
- List of census-designated places in New Mexico
