= Robert Boswell =

American short story writer and novelist (1953- )

- Born: December 8, 1953 (age 72); Missouri, USA
- Other names: Shale Aaron
- Occupations: Author, professor
- Known for: Tumbledown, The Heyday of the Insensitive Bastards

Robert Boswell is an American short story writer and novelist. He has been faculty at the Bread Loaf Writers' Conference.

He shares the Cullen Chair in Creative Writing at the University of Houston with his wife, Antonya Nelson. Boswell teaches creative writing at the University of Houston.

== Works ==
- "Sleeping in Bars". Freight Stories., 2008
- City Bus, published in Ploughshares, Spring 2004

=== Short stories ===
- The Heyday of the Insensitive Bastards. Graywolf Press. 2009. ISBN 978-1-55597-524-1.
- Living to Be 100. Random House, Inc. 1994. ISBN 978-0-679-43063-6.
- Dancing in the Movies. University of Iowa Press. 1986. ISBN 978-0-87745-134-1.

=== Novels ===
- The Geography of Desire. Knopf. 1989. ISBN 978-0-394-57690-9.
- Crooked Hearts. Dell Publishing. 1990. ISBN 978-0-440-50260-9.
- Mystery Ride. HarperPerennial. 1994. ISBN 978-0-06-097585-2.
- Virtual Death. HarperPrism. 1995. ISBN 978-0-06-105430-3. (published under the pseudonym Shale Aaron)
- American Owned Love. HarperFlamingo. 1997. ISBN 978-0-06-097746-7.
- Century's Son, American Owned Love. Macmillan. 2003. ISBN 978-0-312-42231-8.
- Tumbledown. Graywolf Press. 2013. ISBN 9781555976491.

=== Nonfiction ===
- The Half-Known World. Graywolf Press. 2008. ISBN 978-1-55597-504-3.
- What Men Call Treasure: The Search for Gold at Victorio Peak. Cinco Puntos Press. 2008. ISBN 978-1-933693-21-7. A book about a real-life treasure hunt in New Mexico (co-written with David Schweidel).

=== Play ===
- Tongues
