= George Jordan (Medal of Honor) =

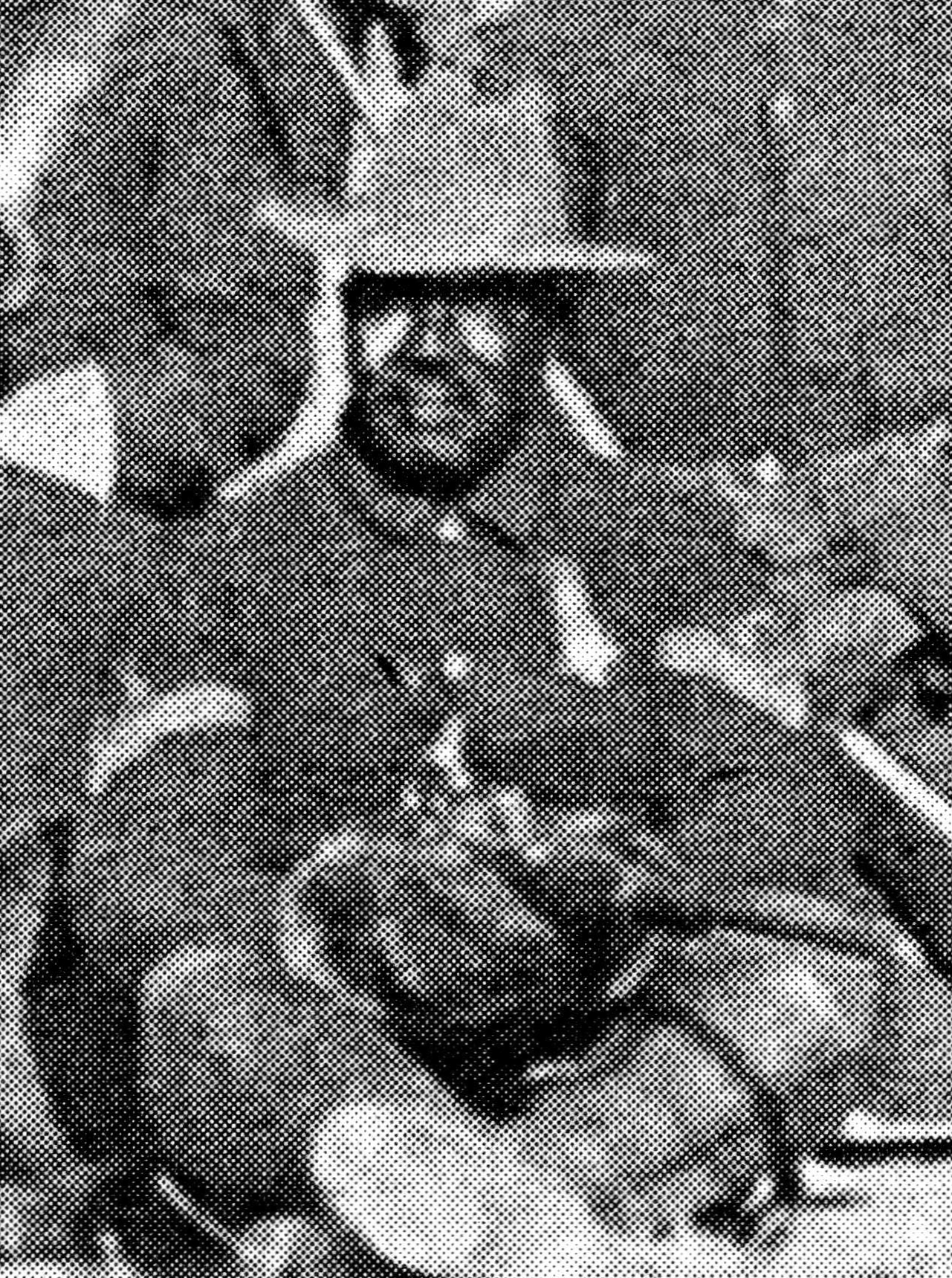
- Sergeant George Jordan
- Born: c. 1847; Williamson County, Tennessee
- Died: October 24, 1904 (aged 56–57)
- Burial place: Fort McPherson National Cemetery, Maxwell, Nebraska
- Military career
- Allegiance: United States
- Branch: United States Army
- Service years: 1866–1897
- Rank: First Sergeant
- Units: 38th Infantry Regiment; 9th Cavalry Regiment
- Conflicts: Apache Wars Battle of Fort Tularosa Battle of Carrizo Canyon
- Awards: Medal of Honor; Certificate of Merit

George Jordan (c. 1847 – October 24, 1904) was a Buffalo Soldier in the United States Army and a recipient of America's highest military decoration—the Medal of Honor—for his actions in the Indian Wars of the western United States.

== Biography ==
Born into slavery, after the Civil War Jordan joined the Army from Nashville, Tennessee. He initially joined the 38th Infantry of the US Colored Troops.

By 1880 he was serving as a Sergeant in Company K of the 9th Cavalry Regiment in New Mexico. They were known informally as Buffalo Soldiers. On May 7, 1890, he was awarded the Medal of Honor for his actions at the Battle of Tularosa on May 14, 1880, and at Carrizo Canyon on August 12, 1881. He was also awarded the Certificate of Merit for his actions at the Carrizo Canyon engagement, which brought with it an additional $2 a month in extra pay.

In 1887, Jordan was commended by the commander at Fort Robinson for capturing an escaped prisoner. Jordan reached the rank of First Sergeant before leaving the Army in 1897. After retirement, he lived in a community with fellow veteran Buffalo Soldiers in Crawford, Nebraska. He died in 1904 and was buried in Fort McPherson National Cemetery, Maxwell, Nebraska.

== Medal of Honor citation ==
Rank and organization: Sergeant, Company K, 9th U.S. Cavalry. Place and date: At Fort Tularosa, N. Mex., May 14, 1880; at Carrizo Canyon, N. Mex., August 12, 1881. Entered service at: Nashville, Tenn. Birth: Williamson County, Tenn. Date of issue: May 7, 1890.

Citation:

While commanding a detachment of 25 men at Fort Tularosa, N. Mex., repulsed a force of more than 100 Indians. At Carrizo Canyon, N . Mex., while commanding the right of a detachment of 19 men, on 12 August 1881, he stubbornly held his ground in an extremely exposed position and gallantly forced back a much superior number of the enemy, preventing them from surrounding the command.

== See also ==
- List of Medal of Honor recipients for the Indian Wars
- List of African American Medal of Honor recipients
