= Carrizo Canyon =

Canyon in San Diego County, California, US

Carrizo Canyon is a canyon in San Diego County, California. Its mouth is at an elevation of 699 feet / 213 meters. It heads at 32°44′39″N 116°11′50″W in the mouth of Carrizo Gorge, at an elevation of 1,411 feet (430 meters), and trends north to where it opens out in southeastern Carrizo Valley less than a mile east of Egg Mountain.
