= Battle of Fort Tularosa =

- Part of the Apache Wars, Victorio's War
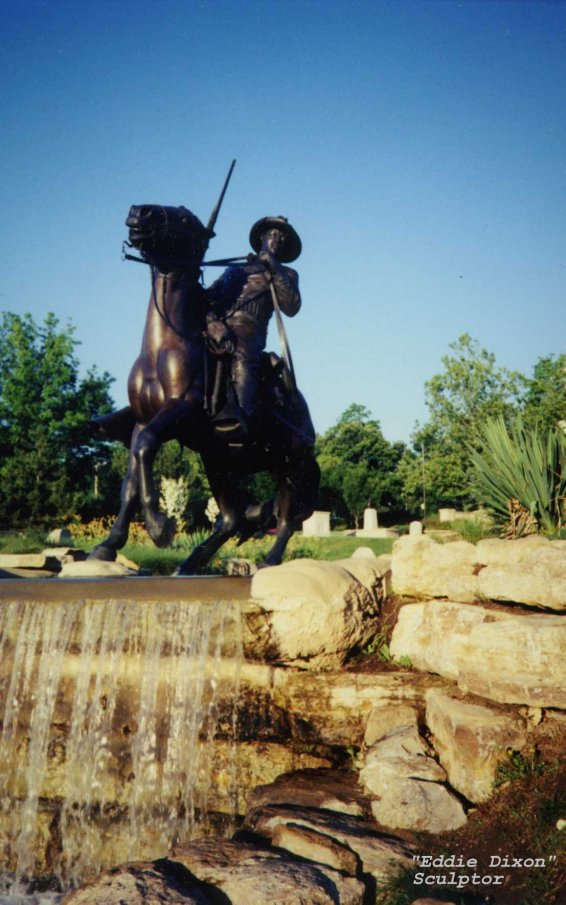
- Buffalo Soldiers monument at Fort Leavenworth, Kansas.
Date	May 14, 1880
Location	Fort Tularosa, New Mexico 33.88292°N 108.52351°W
Result	United States victory

Belligerents
United States	Apache

Commanders and leaders
George Jordan	Victorio

Strength
26 cavalry	~100 warriors

Casualties and losses
None	Unknown

The Battle of Fort Tularosa occurred in May 1880 near the present-day town of Aragon in Catron County, New Mexico. In an ongoing campaign to keep from being forced to live on reservations, Chiricahua Apache warriors led by Victorio attacked Fort Tularosa north of San Francisco Plaza. Buffalo Soldiers from the United States Army's 9th Cavalry, led by Sergeant George Jordan, repulsed the attack.

== Background ==
On May 13, 1880, Sergeant George Jordan marched a detachment of twenty-five soldiers from K Troop of the 9th Cavalry towards New Mexico with orders to protect Fort Tularosa from potential attack, escort provisions, establish a supply depot and protect local settlers. Halfway through the march to the Fort, the detachment received word that Apaches under Victorio were probably striking the townspeople immediately. With this, Jordan asked each of the troops whether they were willing to march hard and fast to get to the action; with no question, every one of the men replied yes. On the morning of May 14, 1880, Sergeant Jordan arrived at Fort Tularosa. After the forced march the soldiers found the town intact without strike from the Apache forces. Jordan immediately had the troops sleep in shifts, in turn building a new fort to protect the townspeople and a new stockade for their animals.

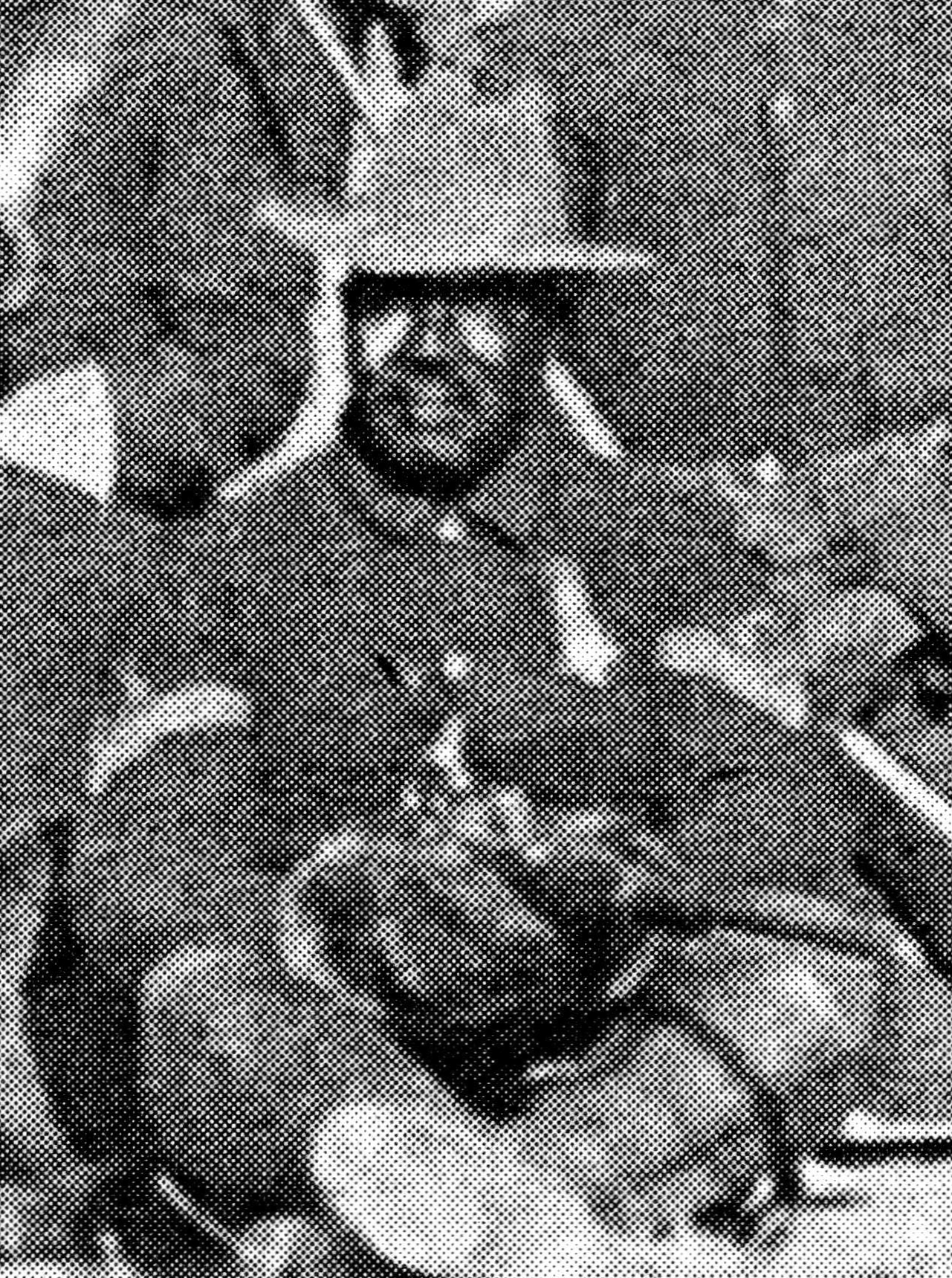
George Jordan, commander during the Battle of Fort Tularosa.

After successfully killing several settlers south of Fort Tularosa, Victorio's forces, reportedly 100 strong, went north to continue their ongoing campaign against white settlements.

== Battle ==
Jordan recorded that "on the evening of the 14th, while I was standing outside the fort conversing with one of the citizens, the Indians came upon us unexpectedly and attacked." As soon as the attack commenced, the town's occupants dashed to the fort and stockade. Victorio's forces attacked the fort on the evening of May 14, immediately firing volleys of arrows towards the embattled townspeople's hiding areas. The Apaches then attacked the fort in rounds, continuously pressuring Jordan's men. However, the soldiers repelled the attacks, and at one point, made a daring rescue and saved all of the town's cattle. The Buffalo Soldiers suffered no casualties, while Victorio's forces suffered several dead and wounded.

Immediately after the battle the remainder of Colonel Edward Hatch's 9th Cavalry arrived at the Fort, with a large contingent giving chase to Victorio's warriors. The American troops were unable to follow the Chiricahua forces after they escaped into Mexico. Ten years after the engagement, Jordan was awarded the Medal of Honor for his leadership.

The battle was one of the few where Chief Victorio was caught by surprise and attacked a guarded encampment instead of waiting in ambush.

== See also ==
- Aragon, New Mexico

== Bibliography ==
- Sonnichsen, C.L. (1960) Tularosa: Last of the Frontier West. New York: Devin-Adair Co.
