= Victorio Peak =

Mountain in New Mexico, United States

- Victoria Peak (historic misspelling)
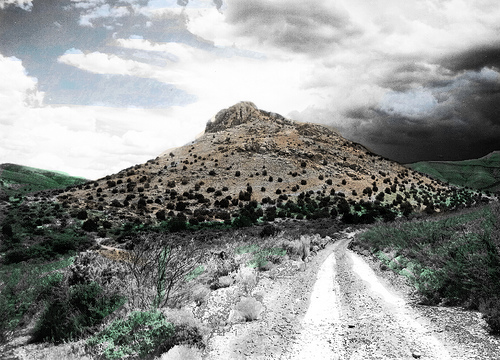
- Victorio Peak

Highest point
- Elevation: 1,676.1 m (5,499 ft)
- Coordinates: 32°55′23″N 106°38′24″W

Geography
- Location: WSMR, New Mexico
- Parent range: San Andres Mountains

Victorio Peak is a high rocky outcropping in the Hembrillo Basin in southern New Mexico. This was one of Chief Victorio's hideouts, and was the site of a battle in 1880 between Victorio's Apaches and the U.S. Army Ninth Cavalry "Buffalo Soldiers." Additionally, an American gold prospector claimed to have found hidden treasure inside the Mountains in the late 1930s.

== Geologic history ==
The Tularosa Basin was developed in the north-south trending San Andres Mountains, and comprises north-south striking Late Paleozoic sedimentary rocks of Permian and Carboniferous age, that lie unconformably upon Precambrian metamorphics. The regional dip of the Paleozoic rocks is gentle, around 10° to the west. The Permian rocks of the Abo and Yeso formations comprise mudrocks and sandstones which are freely weathering to create a series of steps capped by sandstones with intervening argillaceous rocks forming less steep slopes. These slopes and cap rocks were to be used to advantage by the Apaches in 1880. The entrance to the Hembrillo Basin, Hembrillo Canyon, opens eastwards into the Tularosa Basin and White Sands National Park. The Canyon is partially barred by a roughly north-south trending diabase dike. Westwards is the valley of the Jornada del Muerto, the Sierra Caballo mountains and the Rio Grande.

== Namesake ==
As the area was a well-known hideout of Chief Victorio, the peak was named after him. Briefings used by the U.S. Army prior to Operation Goldfinder labeled the mountain as Victoria Peak. Officials at the Range followed the lead of New Mexico historians, who erroneously believed the peak was named after Queen Victoria. Through diligent research, Howard Bryan, a reporter for the Albuquerque Tribune, linked Victorio with the Battle of Hembrillo Basin and discovered the peak's original namesake.

== Battle of Hembrillo Basin ==
The Battle of Hembrillo Basin was fought between components of the United States Army's Sixth Cavalry and Ninth Cavalry against the Chiricahua and Mescalero Apache led by Chief Victorio. Victorio pinned down a small American force of soldiers and withdrew from the battlefield when larger American forces arrived.

== Treasure claims ==
Milton "Doc" and Ova "Babe" Noss claimed to have discovered gold and artifacts inside the peak in 1933. Numerous books (viz., "The Gold House Trilogy" by John Clarence), news reports (see 60 Minutes and Unsolved Mysteries), and a 2023 docuseries "Gold, Lies & Videotape" purport to document the history of the discovery and disposition of the treasure.
